= Salisbury District =

Former local government district in Wiltshire, England

Coordinates: 51.067°N 1.798°W

- Shown within Wiltshire
- Area
  - 2001: 387 sq. miles (1,004.13 km²)
- Population
  - 2001: 115,000
- History
  - Origin: Municipal Borough of New Sarum (or Salisbury) and Municipal Borough of Wilton, Amesbury Rural District, Mere and Tisbury Rural District, Salisbury and Wilton Rural District.
  - Created: 1974
  - Abolished: 2009
  - Succeeded by: Wiltshire Council
- Status: Non-metropolitan district
- ONS code: 46UD
- Government: Salisbury District Council
  - HQ: Salisbury

Salisbury was a local government district in Wiltshire, England from 1974 to 2009. Its main urban area was the city of Salisbury.

The district was formed on 1 April 1974 under the Local Government Act 1972 and the English Non-metropolitan Districts (Definition) Order 1972, as a merger of the previous municipal boroughs of Salisbury and Wilton, along with Amesbury Rural District, Mere and Tisbury Rural District and Salisbury and Wilton Rural District.

On 1 April 2009, the district was abolished as part of the structural changes to local government in England, when its functions were taken over by the new Wiltshire unitary authority. At the same time, a parish council for Salisbury and its suburbs was formed, called Salisbury City Council.

== Political control ==
Salisbury District Council

Type
- Type: Non-metropolitan district

History
- Founded: 1 April 1974
- Disbanded: 1 April 2009
- Preceded by: Borough councils: New Sarum City Council; Wilton Borough Council; Rural district councils: Amesbury Rural District Council; Mere and Tisbury Rural District Council; Salisbury and Wilton Rural District Council
- Succeeded by: Wiltshire Council

Structure
- Seats: 58 councillors (from 1973); 55 councillors (from 2003)
- Length of term: 4 years

Elections
- Voting system: First past the post
- First election: 7 June 1973
- Last election: 3 May 2007

Meeting place
- Salisbury Guildhall

The political control of the council was as follows:

Party in control	Years
No overall control	1979–1987
Conservative	1987–1995
Liberal Democrats	1995–1999
No overall control	1999–2003
Conservative	2003–2007
No overall control	2007–2009

The political composition of the authority when it came to an end on 1 April 2009 was 22 Conservatives, 19 Liberal Democrats, ten Labour members, and four Independents.

== Composition ==
All members of the council were elected at an "all out" election held once every four years, on the first Thursday in May.

Election	CON	LD	LAB	OTH	Control	Ref.
1973	15	8	13	20	No overall control	
1976	21	7	9	21	No overall control	
1979	23	8	7	20	No overall control	
1983	25	10	4	19	No overall control	
1987	32	9	3	14	Conservative	
1991	30	9	5	14	Conservative	
1995	8	31	11	8	Liberal Democrat	
1999	27	16	11	4	No overall control	
2003	31	9	11	4	Conservative	
2007	22	19	10	4	No overall control	

Notes

- LD is used to refer to predecessor parties, the Liberal Party and SDP–Liberal Alliance.
- OTH includes small groups such as Residents' association and Independents.
- Control is the party which had absolute numerical majority, rather than the party or parties that formed a coalition administration.

== Wards ==
In 1975 a statutory instrument established the wards to be used by Salisbury District Council. These boundaries would be in use from the 1976 council elections (with some minor alternations) until 2003, when new ward boundaries came into effect.

Ward	Seats
Alderbury	1
Amesbury	3
Bemerton	3
Bishopdown	1
Bulford	2
Chalke Valley	1
Downhead	1
Downton	2
Durrington	3
Ebble	1
Fisherton and Bemerton Village	2
Fonthill	1
Fovant	1
Harnham	3
Idmiston	1
Knoyle	1
Laverstock	2
Mere	1
Milford	2
Nadder	1
Redlynch	2
St. Edmund	2
St. Mark	3
St. Martin	2
St. Paul	3
Stratford	1
Till Valley	1
Tisbury	1
Upper Bourne	1
Western	1
Whiteparish	1
Wilton	2
Winterbourne	1
Winterslow	1
Woodford Valley	1
Wylye	2
Total	58

In 1998, the Local Government Commission for England began a review of ward boundaries in Salisbury district. After an initial draft proposal and a period of consultation it recommended a reduction in councillors from 58 to 55, and a redrawing of ward boundaries reducing the number to 28. Final recommendations for Salisbury were made in 1999, and were implemented under the District of Salisbury (Electoral Changes) Order 1999. The new boundaries were first used in the 2003 local elections and remained in use until 2009, when the council was dissolved.

Ward	Seats
Alderbury and Whiteparish	3
Amesbury East	3
Amesbury West	1
Bemerton	3
Bishopdown	2
Bulford	2
Chalke Valley	1
Donhead	1
Downton and Redlynch	3
Durrington	3
Ebble	1
Fisherton and Bemerton Village	2
Fonthill and Nadder	1
Harnham East	2
Harnham West	2
Knoyle	1
Laverstock	2
Lower Wylye and Woodford Valley	1
St. Edmund and Milford	2
St. Mark and Stratford	3
St. Martin and Milford	2
St. Paul	2
Till Valley and Wylye	2
Tisbury and Fovant	2
Upper Bourne, Idmiston and Winterbourne	2
Western and Mere	2
Wilton	2
Winterslow	2
Total	55

== Parishes and settlements ==
In addition to the unparished area covering the urban area of Salisbury, the district contained the following civil parishes:

- Alderbury, Allington, Alvediston, Amesbury, Ansty
- Barford St Martin, Berwick St James, Berwick St John, Berwick St Leonard, Bower Chalke, Britford, Broad Chalke, Bulford, Burcombe Without
- Chicklade, Chilmark, Cholderton, Clarendon Park, Compton Chamberlayne, Coombe Bissett
- Dinton, Donhead St Andrew, Donhead St Mary, Downton, Durnford, Durrington
- East Knoyle, Ebbesborne Wake
- Figheldean, Firsdown, Fonthill Bishop, Fonthill Gifford, Fovant
- Great Wishford, Grimstead
- Hindon
- Idmiston
- Kilmington
- Landford, Laverstock
- Maiden Bradley with Yarnfield, Mere, Milston
- Netherhampton, Newton Tony
- Odstock, Orcheston
- Pitton and Farley
- Quidhampton
- Redlynch
- Sedgehill and Semley, Shrewton, South Newton, Stapleford, Steeple Langford, Stourton with Gasper, Stratford Toney, Sutton Mandeville, Swallowcliffe
- Teffont, Tilshead, Tisbury, Tollard Royal
- West Dean, West Knoyle, West Tisbury, Whiteparish, Wilsford cum Lake, Wilton, Winterbourne, Winterbourne Stoke, Winterslow, Woodford, Wylye
- Zeals
