= List of rivers of Wiltshire =

This is a list of rivers and natural waterways that flow either wholly or partially through the ceremonial county of Wiltshire. The list is not comprehensive as there are many small brooks and streams without a recorded name on most official maps. There are three notable rivers that flow through the county: the River Avon (Bristol), the River Avon (Hampshire) and the River Thames.

Due to the geology of the county, the rivers and waterways discharge to the west, east and south. In addition to the natural waterways, the Kennet and Avon Canal crosses the county.

== Rivers ==
Name	Source	Mouth	Image
Bristol Avon	Acton Turville; 51°31′49″N 2°16′26″W	Severn Estuary, Avonmouth, Bristol; 51°30′22″N 2°43′06″W	
Hampshire Avon	Pewsey, Wiltshire; 51°22′10″N 1°41′42″W	English Channel, Mudeford, Dorset; 50°43′23″N 1°44′53″W	
Biss	near Upton Scudamore, Wiltshire; 51°13′42″N 2°11′40″W	River Avon at Staverton, Wiltshire; 51°20′12″N 2°12′56″W	
Blackwater	Redlynch, Wiltshire; 50°59′23″N 1°42′44″W	Totton, Hampshire; 50°55′36″N 1°29′31″W	
Bourne	Burbage; 51°21′09″N 1°40′17″W	Salisbury; 51°03′44″N 1°47′22″W	
Broadmead Brook	west of Marshfield, Gloucestershire; 51°27′24″N 2°21′45″W	Bybrook River north west of Castle Combe; 51°29′54″N 2°14′13″W	
Brinkworth Brook	Broad Hinton, Wiltshire; 51°30′7.92″N 1°52′24.6″W	Bristol Avon, Great Somerford, Wiltshire; 51°32′43.44″N 2°2′17.52″W	
Bybrook River	Prime: Lower Lapdown Farm, Tormarton, South Gloucestershire; 51°29′53.88″N 2°20′34.44″W; Secondary: Folly Farm, Cold Ashton, South Gloucestershire; 51°27′23.4″N 2°21′43.56″W	Bristol Avon, Batheaston; 51°24′5.76″N 2°18′36.72″W	
Bydemill Brook	Stanton Country Park, south of Stanton Fitzwarren; 51.600328°N 1.747239°W	confluence with River Thames; 51.669759°N 1.719348°W	
Chalke	Mead End, near Bowerchalke, Wiltshire; 51°0′44″N 1°57′56″W	confluence with River Ebble at Broad Chalke; 51°1′35″N 1°57′27″W	River Chalke and adjoining fish farm between Mead End, Bowerchalke and Broad Chalke
River Churn	Seven Springs, Gloucestershire; 51°51′4″N 2°3′1″W	confluence with River Thames; 51°39′14″N 1°51′12″W	
Cocklemore Brook	Studley, Wiltshire; 51°25′2″N 2°4′6″W	River Avon (Bristol) south of Chippenham; 51°25′56″N 2°6′7″W	
Cole	Wanborough, Wiltshire; 51°32′34″N 1°41′54″W	River Thames; 51°41′19″N 1°4′37″W	
Damson Brook	Milston; 51°12′22″N 1°46′08″W	confluence with Nine Mile River; 51°11′20″N 1°45′36″W	No picture available
Derry Brook	Ravensroost Wood, Minety Common; 51.595278°N 1.973032°W	confluence with Swill Brook south of Ashton Keynes; 51.638041°N 1.922296°W	No picture available
Doncombe Brook	south of Marshfield, Gloucestershire; 51.459253°N 2.312498°W	confluence with Bybrook River at Ford; 51.470562°N 2.233651°W	
River Dun (River Kennet)	Great Bedwyn; 51°22′16″N 1°36′25″W	River Kennet near Hungerford; 51°24′44″N 1°29′39″W	River Dun near Hungerford
River Dun (River Test)	51°3′12.05″N 1°40′57.62″W	Confluence with River Test near Kimbridge in Hampshire; 51.030672°N 1.533504°W	
River Ebble	Alvediston; 51.0127°N 2.039°W	confluence with River Avon; 51.0334°N 1.7582°W	
Gauze Brook	Littleton Drew; 51.5265°N 2.2391°W	River Avon (Bristol) south of Malmesbury; 51.5623°N 2.0802°W	
River Kennet	Swallowhead Spring near Silbury Hill; 51.50276°N 1.84507°W	confluence with River Thames at Reading; 51.459148°N 0.94947°W	
Key	Braydon Forest near Purton; 51°35′11″N 1°51′57″W	confluence with River Thames near Cricklade; 51°38′22″N 1°51′27″W	
Lambrok Stream	Hoopers Pool between Southwick and Rode; 51.285141°N 2.249281°W	confluence with River Biss at Trowbridge; 51.321743°N 2.220678°W	
River Marden	Ranscombe Bottom, Calstone Wellington, near Calne; 51°24′56″N 2°0′48″W	Bristol Avon near Chippenham; 51°27′56″N 2°05′33″W	
River Nadder	Springs at Nadder Head near Donhead St Mary; 51.016951°N 2.175815°W	Confluence with River Avon (Hampshire) in Salisbury; 51.060677°N 1.799525°W	
Nine Mile	Brigmerston Down northeast of Bulford Camp; 51.226017°N 1.714214°W	Confluence of River Avon at Bulford; 51.188797°N 1.768739°W	
Oddford Brook	Bitham Lake northwest of Tisbury; 51.073844°N 2.116175°W	confluence with River Nadder at Tisbury; 51.060750°N 2.082072°W	No picture available
River Og	Draycot Foliat; 51°29′53″N 1°44′25″W	River Kennet near Marlborough; 51°25′13″N 1°43′43″W	
River Ray	Wroughton; 51°31′24″N 1°47′29″W	Confluence with River Thames 51°38′39″N 1°49′20″W	
River Sem	near Sedgehill; 51.047620°N 2.184409°W	near Wardour; 51.045790°N 2.110142°W	No picture available
Semington Brook	The Warren south of West Lavington; 51.264651°N 1.996125°W	confluence with River Avon (Bristol) near Whaddon; 51.353071°N 2.171855°W	
River Stour, Dorset	Stourhead; 51.104584°N 2.326786°W	English Channel at Christchurch, Dorset; 50.72796°N 1.77295°W	
Summerham Brook	north of Rowde; 51.360947°N 2.014142°W	confluence with Semington Brook, south of Seend Cleeve; 51.332359°N 2.098262°W	
Swill Brook	confluence of Braydon Brook and Flagham Brook near Somerford Keynes; 51.638517°N 1.976646°W	confluence with River Thames at Ashton Keynes; 51.638890°N 1.923656°W	
Tetbury Avon	Wor Well, Tetbury; 51.6432°N 2.1424°W	River Avon (Bristol) at Malmesbury; 51.5821°N 2.09289°W	
Thames	enters Wiltshire to the east of Ashton Keynes	leaves Wiltshire to the southwest of Lechlade-on-Thames	
Till	near Tilshead; 51°13′49″N 1°57′21″W	confluence with River Wylye near Stapleford; 51°08′09″N 1°54′07″W	
Woodbridge Brook	Midgehall Copse near Lydiard Millicent; 51.5605°N 1.9115°W	confluence with River Avon (Bristol) near Malmesbury	No picture available
Wylye	Rodmead Farm near Maiden Bradley; 51°07′25″N 2°18′11″W	Confluence with River Nadder; 51°04′45″N 1°51′45″W	
