= Bishopstone, Salisbury =

Village in Wiltshire, England

Coordinates: 51.031°N 1.903°W

Bishopstone
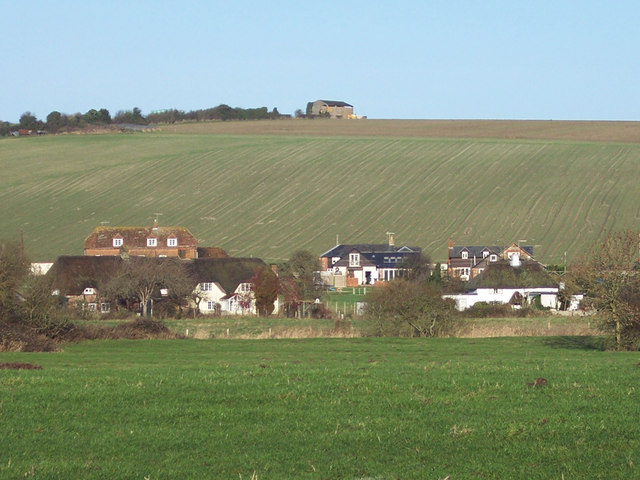
- Houses under Netton Down, Bishopstone

- Location within Wiltshire
- Population: 717 (in 2021)
- OS grid reference: SU069257
- Civil parish: Bishopstone
- Unitary authority: Wiltshire
- Ceremonial county: Wiltshire
- Region: South West
- Country: England
- Sovereign state: United Kingdom
- Post town: Salisbury
- Postcode district: SP5
- Dialling code: 01722
- Police: Wiltshire
- Fire: Dorset and Wiltshire
- Ambulance: South Western
- UK Parliament: Salisbury
- Website: Village

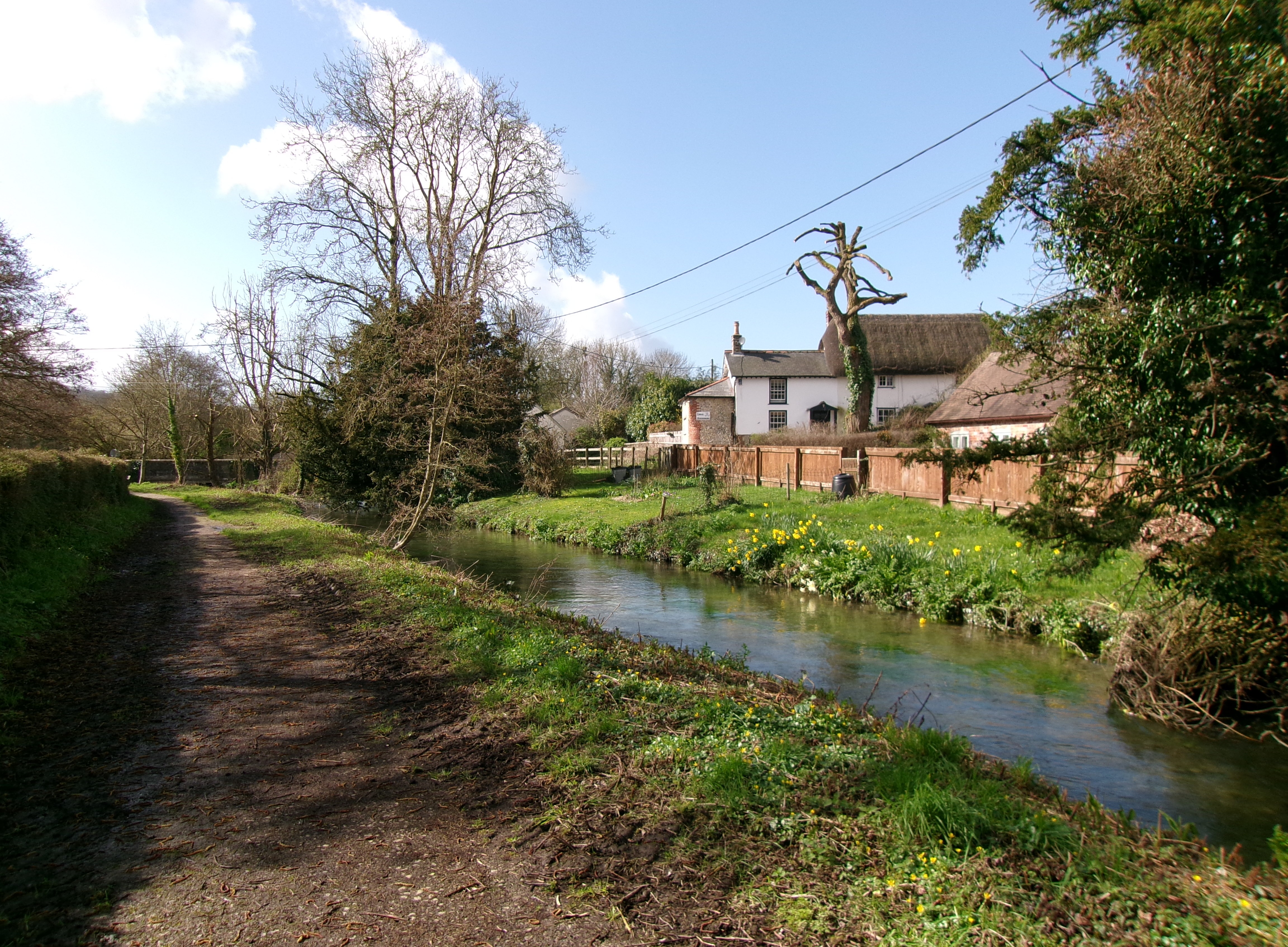
River Ebble at Bishopstone

Bishopstone is a village and civil parish in Wiltshire, England, in the Ebble valley about 5.5 miles (9 km) south-west of Salisbury. The parish is on the county boundary with Hampshire and includes the small village of Croucheston and the hamlet of The Pitts (now Pitts Road).

== History ==
The area was settled in prehistoric times. There was a bowl barrow near Croucheston Down Farm and Grim's Ditch, a prehistoric earthwork, forms the southern boundary of the parish. The Roman road from Old Sarum to Dorchester crosses the river near Throope.

Before the 10th century, much of the land forming the present-day parish was part of a large estate called Downton. Early in the 10th century a manor at what is now Bishopstone was granted to Winchester Abbey as an early endowment; around that time the whole river valley was known as Ebbesborne, and the village had the same name. A prefix "Bishop's" was sometimes used to distinguish the village from another in the same valley, and in the later Middle Ages the parish became known as Bishopstone; meanwhile the other village became Ebbesbourne Wake.

The Domesday Book in 1086 divided the Chalke Valley into eight manors: Chelke (Chalke – Broad Chalke and Bowerchalke), Eblesborne (Ebbesbourne Wake), Fifehide (Fifield Bavant), Cumbe (Coombe Bissett), Humitone (Homington), Odestoche (Odstock), Stradford (Stratford Tony and Bishopstone) and Trow (circa Alvediston and Tollard Royal).

The parish contained six ancient townships, possibly since Saxon times, each with land bounded by the river. To the north of the river these were Bishopstone (with the parish church), Netton and Flamston; to the south, Throope, Faulston and Croucheston. The roadside settlement known as The Pitts developed in the 19th century.

=== Faulston ===
Faulston (or Falston, Falstone) manor was inherited in 1328 by Thomas Benton (d. 1358) whose descendants had surnames Baynton or Bayntun. The estate was confiscated from Sir Robert Baynton in 1475 for his support of Henry VI at the Battle of Tewkesbury, and granted to John Cheyne, later Baron Cheyne; but returned in 1503 to Sir Robert's son John (d. 1516). Sir John's son and heir Sir Edward Bayntun (c.1480 – 1544) was a soldier and courtier who was a royal favourite, appointed vice-chamberlain to Queen Anne Boleyn and later wives of Henry VIII. Sir Edward's second wife was Isabel Leigh, half sister to Catherine Howard, Henry's fifth wife. After Isabel's death in 1573, the manor was inherited by a younger son Henry, who sat for several Wiltshire constituencies but "without leaving any mark on the known proceedings of the House".

Henry sold the manor to Charles Vaughan in 1577, and it was inherited in 1584 by his grand-nephew Walter Vaughan (c.1572–1639) who sat in Parliament for one term, was High Sheriff in 1599–1600, and later deputy lieutenant. Arbella Stuart stayed for over a month from the end of October 1603, as the royal court moved from Winchester to Salisbury and Wilton.

The manor passed to his younger son George (knighted 1643), who commanded a regiment of Royalist cavalry at the Battle of Lansdowne. After Wiltshire fell to the Parliamentarians in 1645, they seized Sir George's house and used it as the meeting-place of the 'Falstone House Committee', which determined the fines to be paid by 47 Wiltshire Royalist supporters. In 1649 the house's fortifications were ordered to be destroyed, and Sir George sold the manor in that year to the earl of Pembroke. The house was rebuilt, although traces of a moat remain. The property remained with the Pembrokes until the farm was sold to its tenant in 1919.

== Settlements and notable buildings ==
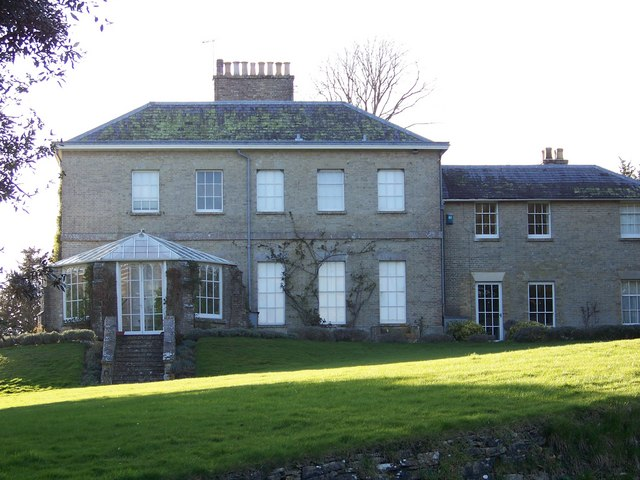
Rear of Bishopstone House

The site of Bishopstone village has only the church, the former rectory, Manor Farm and a few houses; there are signs of a deserted medieval village east of the church. The rectory, now called Bishopstone House, was built in yellow brick around 1820 to designs of Bath architect John Lowder; it was sold into private use in the 1950s. Manor Farm was built in the early 19th century for the Wilton estate, the house in red brick and the later outbuildings in characteristic banded brick and flint.

Throope has always been a small settlement. The main dwelling is Throope Manor, built in the early 18th century for the Button family and extended in 1935 for Lord Essex. It may incorporate a 17th-century house, and contains panelling from that century.

Netton developed as a linear village along what is now Pitts Lane and Netton Street. Netton Old Farmhouse, two storeys in chequered flint and limestone under a thatched roof, has a 1637 date tablet. To the west, the former Three Horseshoes Inn is from the 18th century. Also in this area is the parish hall, built in 1885 and extended in 1921. The White Hart pub, beside the road from Coombe Bissett to Broad Chalke, was a public house in 1792 but the present building is from the 19th century.

Flamston was another linear village. A farm and two thatched cottages remain on Flamston Street.

Croucheston House is a farmhouse from the late 18th century, in banded brick and flint. Chapel Lane has the former Methodist chapel and Sudbury House, from the late 17th century in brick and thatch, with a contrasting c.1800 addition in flint and brick. Further south, 'Old Rafters' is a 16th-century timber-framed cottage, again brick, flint and thatch, altered in later centuries. Next to the river is a corn mill which was in use until the 1990s and may be on the site of the mill recorded in the 13th century.

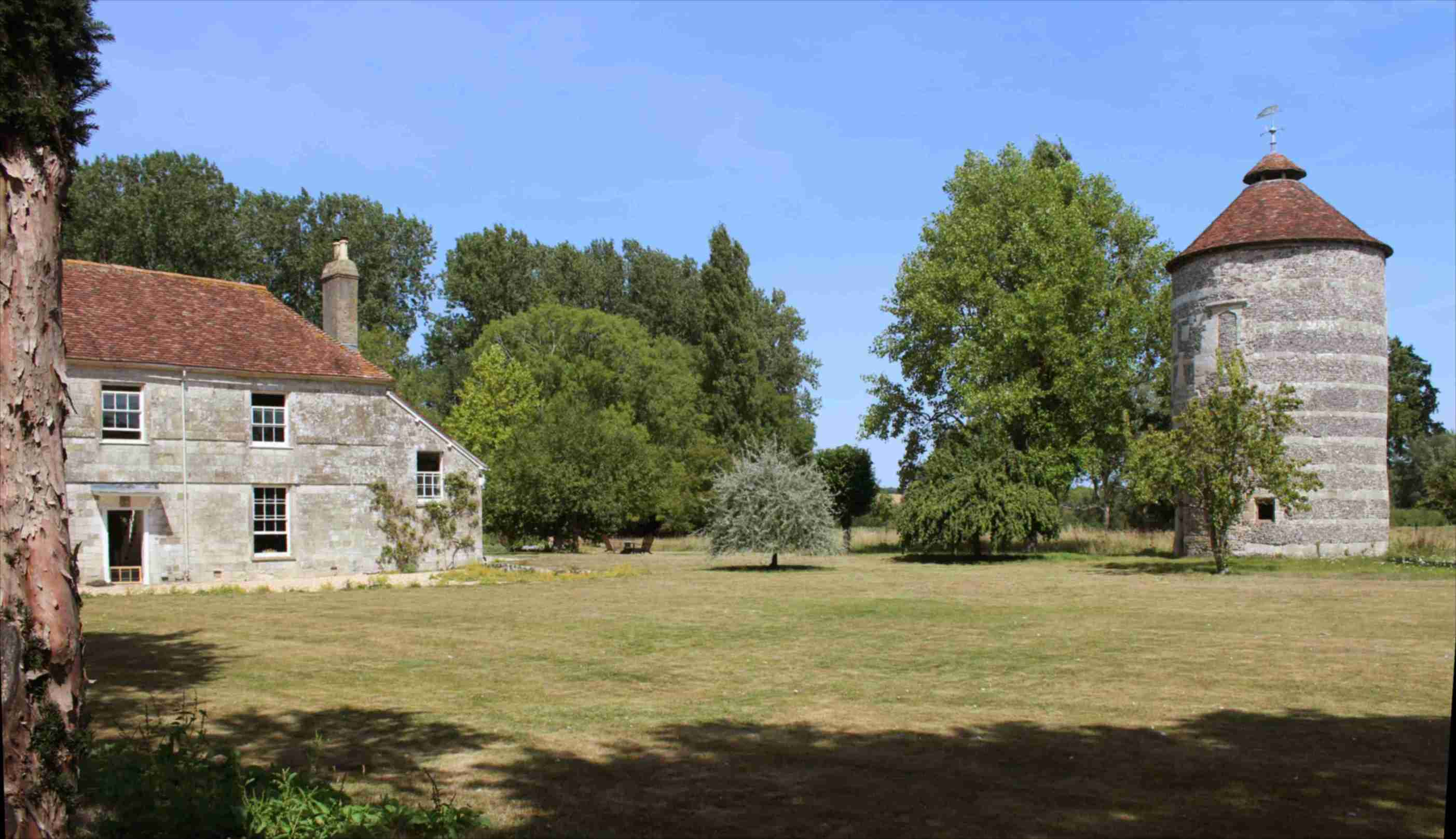
Faulston House and dovecote

At Faulston, farmsteads were abandoned in the Middle Ages to leave only the manor house and its farm. The present Faulstone House is a rebuilding of c.1800 in dressed limestone and a tiled roof. A tall dovecote from the early 17th century, in flint with dressed limestone bands under a conical tiled roof, is Grade II* listed; it may have been part of the fortifications of the earlier house. Farm buildings across the road were built in the mid-19th century in brick and flint bands for the Wilton estate. Faulston had a corn mill with a house attached, downstream from the settlement and known as Lower Mill, which was in use until the 1940s.

== Religious sites ==
=== Parish church ===
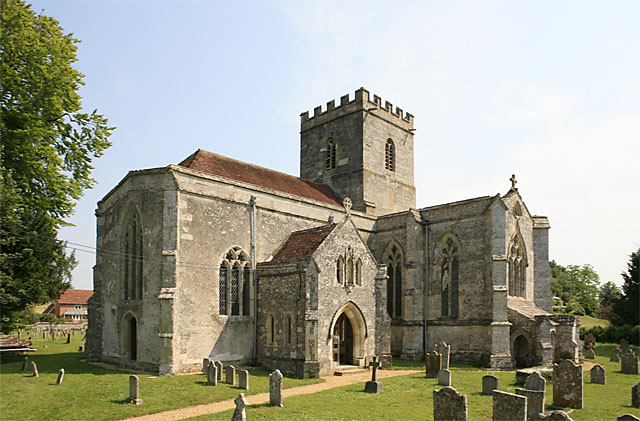
Parish church

The Church of England parish church of St John the Baptist is Grade I listed. Traces of a 12th-century building are found in the rubble walls of the nave, and a small blank arch with a Norman head. By the late 13th century the church had a cruciform plan. It was rebuilt in the 14th century, with vaulted ceilings in the chancel, vestry and south transept; both transepts were originally chapels. The low tower at the crossing was built c.1406 and had a wooden spire until at least 1567. The two-storey porch was added in the same century. 19th-century restoration included the rebuilding of the porch and a new east window.

Julian Orbach, extending Nikolaus Pevsner's work in the Buildings of England series, describes the church as big and impressive. He compares its style to Edington church which was also begun by a bishop of Winchester.

There are several monuments outside. By the south transept, a small stone structure of two vaulted bays, buttressed and open on three sides, shelters a 13th-century decorated tomb chest, perhaps moved from elsewhere. Pevsner calls this "the strangest of additions" and speculates that it is a memorial to the patron who built this part of the church.

The priest's door on the south side of the chancel has a deep vaulted hood with an ogee gable and crocket parapet. Inside the church, a triple sedilia has ornately carved vaults and pinnacles. Orbach praises the vaulted roofs of the chancel and south transept. The east window of 1898 is by Powell and Sons, paid for by a bequest of George Augustus Montgomery, rector from 1821 until his accidental death in 1842.

In the north transept is a richly decorated tomb recess, with stone coffin-lids. Dominating the south transept is an ornately canopied monument of 1844 by A. W. Pugin, a memorial to Rev. Montgomery. Orbach calls it "super-Gothic". Next to it is a piscina in similar style. At one time, above this was a window designed by Pugin and executed by William Wailes; this has since been replaced by clear glass with re-set medieval pieces.

The octagonal font is 14th-century with later carving. Some of the woodwork was brought from Seville in 1838 by Montgomery; Orbach describes the pulpit as "a disorderly assemblage of very good things". The three bells in the tower were cast in 1583, 1587 and 1652, and are said to be in unringable condition.

==== Parish ====
By 1264 the church had a rector and a vicar, but from 1584 it was customary to appoint the same man to both positions. In 1815 the two benefices were united in a rectory. The benefice of Stratford Tony was united with Bishopstone in 1925, with the incumbent to live at Bishopstone, although the parishes remained distinct. A group ministry was established for the Ebble valley in 1972, and today the parish is part of the wider Chalke Valley Churches benefice alongside twelve others.

Parish registers from 1636 are held at the Wiltshire and Swindon History Centre, Chippenham.

==== Notable incumbents ====
Notable holders of the living, as rector and/or vicar, include:

- Nicholas Bildeston, at the same time archdeacon of Winchester and dean of Salisbury, rector from 1423 to 1441
- John Earle, rector from 1639, later chaplain to Charles II and then Bishop of Salisbury
- John Younger, rector from 1688 to 1728, dean of Salisbury from 1705
- George Augustus Montgomery, 1821–1842; as well as arranging renovations and furnishings, he paid for the building of the village school and willed money for a charity to provide subsidised coal to villagers
- Francis Lear, rector from 1842 until his death in 1850, dean of Salisbury from 1846. His son, also Francis, was curate from 1847 and rector 1850–1914, then archdeacon of Salisbury from 1875 to 1913.

=== Others ===
A Primitive Methodist chapel was opened in 1833 at Croucheston and continued in use until 1978.

== Amenities ==
A school was built in Pitts Road in 1843 and educated children of all ages until 1932 when it became a junior school. It closed in 1977 due to falling pupil numbers.

Bishopstone has a village hall. It also has a pub, the White Hart. There was another, the Three Horseshoes, in an 18th-century building, but it closed in 2002.

Throope Down is a Site of Special Scientific Interest, recognised for its variety of grasses, herbs and orchids.
