= Fifield Bavant =

Village in Wiltshire, England

Coordinates: 51.025°N 1.977°W

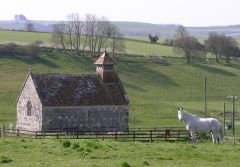
- St Martin's Church

- Location within Wiltshire
- OS grid reference: SU017251
- Civil parish: Ebbesborne Wake
- Unitary authority: Wiltshire
- Ceremonial county: Wiltshire
- Region: South West
- Country: England
- Sovereign state: United Kingdom
- Post town: Salisbury
- Postcode district: SP5
- Dialling code: 01722
- Police: Wiltshire
- Fire: Dorset and Wiltshire
- Ambulance: South Western
- UK Parliament: Salisbury

Fifield Bavant (/'fʌɪfiːld 'bavənt/) is a small village in the civil parish of Ebbesborne Wake, in Wiltshire, England, about 6 miles (10 km) southwest of Wilton, midway between Ebbesbourne Wake and Broad Chalke on the north bank of the River Ebble. Fifield Bavant was formerly a separate civil parish. The small Church of England parish church, begun in the 13th century, is dedicated to Saint Martin and is a Grade II* listed building. The population is now about 20.

== History ==
Fragmentary records from Saxon times indicate that the Ebble valley was a thriving area. The Domesday Book in 1086 records the Chalke Valley as divided into eight manors, Chelke (Chalke – Broad Chalke and Bowerchalke), Eblesborne (Ebbesbourne Wake), Fifehide (Fifield Bavant), Cumbe (Coombe Bissett), Humitone (Homington), Odestoche (Odstock), Stradford (Stratford Tony and Bishopstone) and Trow (circa Alvediston).

The name of Fifield Bavant has evolved over the centuries. The Domesday Book records the manor as Fifehide (probably representing Five Hides). By 1264 it was called Fifield Scudamore because Peter de Scudamore was lord of the manor. By 1463 it was recorded as Fiffehyde Beaufaunt after ownership had passed to the Beaufaunt family, later usually spelt Bavant.

The name Fifehide probably derives from 'five hides'. A hide was once an area of land which would support a household, varying according to time and place and land quality, but typically ranging from 40 to 160 acres, or 16 to 65 hectares. Later in Anglo-Saxon England it was a unit used for assessing land tax.

Peter Meers, in his book Ebbesbourne Wake through the Ages, translates Fifield's Domesday entry as:

Alvred [of Marleborough] holds Fifehide, Ralph from him. TRE it paid tax for five hides. Land for four ploughs. In lordship three hides, there one plough and three slaves. Nine villagers (villeins) and six smallholders (bordars) with two ploughs. Two acres of meadow, pasture half a league long and half a furlong wide. Value £4, now £5. One forge pays 12d a year and two Wilton burgesses pay 18d. Woolmaer holds one hide from Alvred, the same person held it TRE, it was and is worth 10s.

In 1840, Samuel Lewis's Topographical Dictionary said of the parish:

Fifield-Bavent, a parish in the Union of Wilton, Hundred of Chalke, Salisbury and Amesbury, and Southern, Divisions of the county of Wilts, 6 3/4 miles (S.W.) from Wilton; containing 49 inhabitants. The living is a discharged rectory, valued in the king's books at £7. 10. Present net income, £170, patron the Marquess of Bath.

Fifield Bavant was a separate civil parish for eight centuries. In 1885, it lost its southern area of some 283 acres to Bowerchalke, and on 31 December 1894 the parish was extinguished, when the remaining 870 acres of the northern part were annexed to Ebbesbourne Wake. In 1891 the parish had a population of 43. In 1923 the separate ecclesiastical parish also came to an end, when the benefice of St Martin's was united with that of St John the Baptist in Ebbesbourne.

The parish registers, held in the Wiltshire and Swindon History Centre, record christenings from 1696 to 1991, marriages from 1699 to 1922, and burials from 1696 to 1913.

A detailed parish history was published by the Wiltshire Victoria County History in 1987, as part of its Volume XIII: Chalke hundred.
