= Gallows Hill SSSI, Wiltshire =

Protected area in Wiltshire, England

Gallows Hill
- Site of Special Scientific Interest
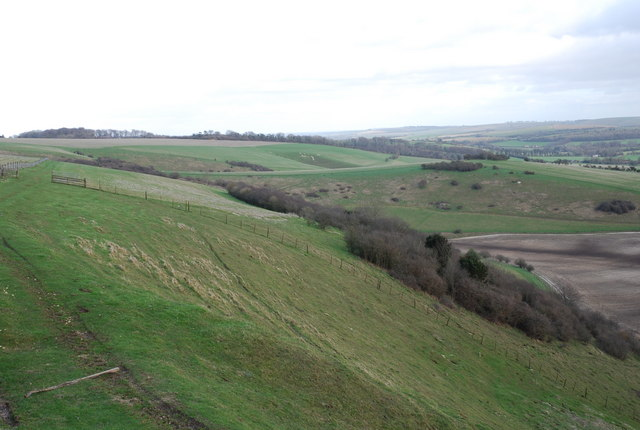
- View towards Gallows Hill

- Location within Wiltshire
- Location of Gallows Hill.
- Grid reference: ST 952 244
- Coordinates: 51.019°N 2.070°W
- Interest: Biological
- Area: 27.8 hectares (69 acres)
- Notification date: 1965

Gallows Hill SSSI is a Site of Special Scientific Interest on the north side of the Ebble Valley in south Wiltshire, England. Its chalk grassland and scrub contain a number of animal and plant species that are nationally rare. The 27.8 hectares (69 acres) site was notified in 1965.

== The site ==
The site includes three areas of a series of slopes, with a range of aspects, on a long ridge of Lower, Middle, and Upper Chalk formations. The site lies in Alvediston parish and within the Cranborne Chase and West Wiltshire Downs Area of Outstanding Natural Beauty. The OS grid reference for the site is ST 952 244.

== Importance ==
The site is important as an example of a species-rich downland habitat. This type of habitat has been reduced across the country because of changes in agricultural practice.

The site is notable for (in the grassland areas) Festuca ovina (sheep's fescue), Avenula pratensis (meadow oat-grass), Brachypodium pinnatum (tor-grass), and Polyommatus bellargus (Adonis Blue) – a nationally scarce species of butterfly. In the scrub areas are Crataegus monogyna (common hawthorn), and Hedera helix (ivy).

== History ==
Gallows Hill SSSI was first notified in 1965 under Section 28 of the Wildlife and Countryside Act 1981. The notification was revised in 1975.
