= Odstock Down =

Protected area in Wiltshire, England

Coordinates: 51.02420°N 1.80319°W

Odstock Down (grid reference SU139250) is a 12.1 hectare biological Site of Special Scientific Interest in Wiltshire, England, above the village of Odstock. It was notified in 1975.

== Sources ==
- Natural England citation sheet for the site (accessed 7 April 2022)
