= Pincombe Down =

Protected area in Wiltshire, England

Coordinates: 50.9947°N 2.0498°W

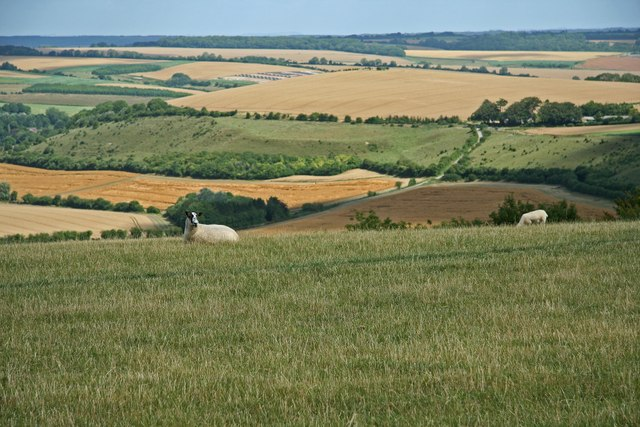
The view from Ox Drove across Pincombe Down

Pincombe Down (grid reference ST966217) is a 23.8 hectare biological Site of Special Scientific Interest in southwest Wiltshire, England, notified in 1971. The site lies in Alvediston and Berwick St John parishes.

== Sources ==
- Natural England citation sheet for the site (accessed 11 April 2022)
