= Throope Down =

Protected area in Wiltshire, England

Coordinates: 51.019°N 1.879°W

Throope Down (grid reference SU086244) is a 34.4 hectare biological Site of Special Scientific Interest in Wiltshire, England, on chalk grassland in Bishopstone parish south-east of Salisbury. The site was notified in 1971 and again in 1986.

== Sources ==
- "Throope Down SSSI". Natural England.
