= John Stevens (cricketer, born 1875) =

English cricketer

Personal information
- Full name: John Elgar Stevens
- Born: 21 March 1875; Broad Chalke, Wiltshire, England
- Died: 10 April 1923 (aged 48); Woking, Surrey, England
- Batting: Right-handed
- Bowling: Right-arm medium-fast

Domestic team information
- Years: Team
- 1895–1912: Wiltshire
- 1902: Marylebone Cricket Club

Career statistics
Competition	First-class
Matches	1
Runs scored	4
Batting average	4.00
100s/50s	–/–
Top score	4
Catches/stumpings	–/–
- Source: Cricinfo, 28 June 2019

John Elgar Stevens (21 March 1875 – 10 April 1923) was an English first-class cricketer.

Stevens was born in March 1875 at Broad Chalke in Wiltshire. He was educated at Sherborne School, where he was the public schools boxing champion, before going up to Exeter College, Oxford. Though he did not progress into the Oxford University team after the freshman match of 1895, he did however make his debut for Wiltshire in minor counties cricket in the same year. He later made a single appearance in first-class cricket for the Marylebone Cricket Club against Leicestershire at Lord's in 1902. Batting once in the match, he was dismissed for 4 runs by John King. He played minor counties cricket for Wiltshire until 1912, making a total of 98 appearances in the Minor Counties Championship.

After serving in the First World War with the Royal Army Veterinary Corps, Stevens fell on hard times. Living in Camberley, his employment with the London Stock Exchange had ceased and he was surviving from his war pension. His wife had also been admitted to a mental asylum and Stevens was suffering from a heart condition. In his last days he had begun drinking heavily, making wild statements and threatening suicide. On the evening of 10 April 1923 he bought a platform ticket at Woking railway station, telling a ticket collector he was waiting for a friend on a downward train from London. His body was later found at the far ends of platforms 2 and 3, with a suicide note contained in his pocket so to have committed rail suicide.
