= Bowerchalke =

Village in Wiltshire, England

Coordinates: 51.005°N 1.976°W

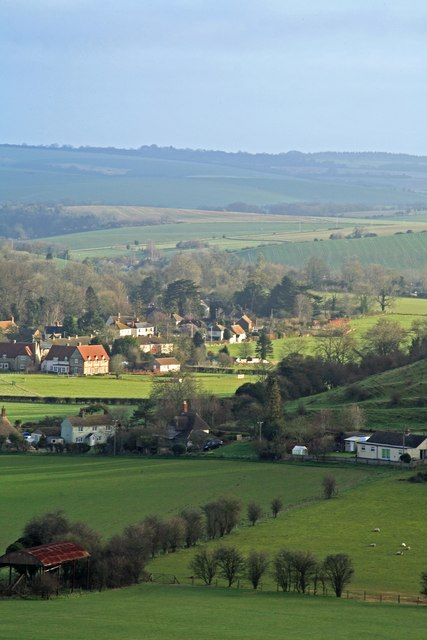

- Location within Wiltshire
- Population: 362 (in 2021)
- OS grid reference: SU018228
- Civil parish: Bowerchalke
- Unitary authority: Wiltshire
- Ceremonial county: Wiltshire
- Region: South West
- Country: England
- Sovereign state: United Kingdom
- Post town: Salisbury
- Postcode district: SP5
- Dialling code: 01722
- Police: Wiltshire
- Fire: Dorset and Wiltshire
- Ambulance: South Western
- UK Parliament: Salisbury

Bowerchalke is a village and civil parish in Wiltshire, England, about 9 miles (14 km) southwest of Salisbury. It is in the south of the county, about 1 mile (1.6 km) from the boundary with Dorset and 2 miles (3.2 km) from that with Hampshire. The parish includes the hamlets of Mead End, Misselfore and Woodminton. In 2021 the parish had a population of 362.

Bowerchalke is in the Cranborne Chase and West Wiltshire Downs Area of Outstanding Natural Beauty, which is part of the Southern England Chalk Formation. The River Chalke, a classic chalk stream, rises in the village and joins the River Ebble at Broad Chalke, flowing into the Hampshire Avon south of Salisbury.

The Grade II* listed church of the Holy Trinity dates from the 13th century, and Nobel Prize winning novelist William Golding is buried in the churchyard.

== History ==
It is not known when Bowerchalke was first inhabited or what it was called but fragmentary records from Saxon times indicate that the whole Chalke Valley area was thriving, the River Ebble also being known as the River Chalke.

=== Prehistory ===
The earliest known sign of habitation is the bowl barrow on Marleycombe Down, which was probably built in either the Neolithic or the Bronze Age (3300–1200 BCE). The Bowerchalke Barrel Urn was excavated here in 1925 by Dr R Clay, and the repaired urn is part of the collection at the Wiltshire Museum, Devizes.

=== 4th century ===
Two hoards of gold and silver coins and rings from the 4th century were discovered by metal detectorists near Bowerchalke in the 20th and 21st centuries. They were used by the Durotriges, a Celtic tribe that lived in South Wiltshire and Dorset before the Roman occupation, became Romanised by c.79 and gave their name to Dorset. The first discovery was a hoard of 17 gold staters (coins), examples of which are now displayed in the Salisbury Museum. The second hoard of 2 gold rings and 5 silver coins dated to 380 was found in 2002 near the first.

=== 9th century ===
An Anglo-Saxon charter of 826 records the name of the area including Bowerchalke and Broad Chalke as Cealcan gemere.

=== 10th century ===
In 955 the Anglo-Saxon King Eadwig granted the nuns of Wilton Abbey an estate called Chalke which included land in Broad Chalke and Bowerchalke. The charter records the village name as aet Ceolcan. A charter in 974 records the name as Cheolca or Cheolcam.

=== 11th century ===
The Domesday Book in 1086 divided the Chalke Valley into eight manors, Chelke or Chelce or Celce (Bowerchalke and Broad Chalke), Eblesborne (Ebbesbourne Wake), Fifehide (Fifield), Cumbe (Coombe Bissett), Humitone (Homington), Odestoche (Odstock), Stradford (Stratford Tony and Bishopstone) and Trow (approximately Alvediston and Tollard Royal).

=== 12th century ===
In the 12th century the area was known primarily as the Stowford Hundred then subsequently as the Chalke Hundred. This included the parishes of Berwick St John, Ebbesbourne Wake, Fifield Bavant, Semley, Tollard Royal and 'Chalke'. A charter of 1165 records the village name as Chalca, and the Pipe Rolls in 1174 record it as Chalche.

=== 13th century ===
The Curia Regis Rolls of 1207 records the village name as ChelkFeet of Fines, and another of 1242 records it as Chalke. The name Bower Chalke was apparently given to that part of the Chalke estate where lands were in 'bower hold' tenure. The name Burchelke first appeared in 1225. The church of the Holy Trinity dates from this century.

=== 14th century ===
A Saxon charter of 1304 records the village name as Cheolc and Cheolcan. The Feudal Aids of 1316 uses Chawke, whilst a Saxon Cartulary of 1321 uses Cealce. The Tax lists of 1327, 1332 and 1377 variously record the name as Chalk Magna and Chalke Magna. Brode Chalk was first mentioned in 1380. Bower Chalke had become a separate parish by the early 14th century.

=== 16th century ===
c. 1536 Henry VIII granted Chalke to William Herbert (later Sir William Herbert, 1st Earl of Pembroke) during the dissolution of the monasteries. Henry VIII 'much valued' Herbert, a successful and ambitious soldier, who also became his brother-in-law through his marriage to Anne Parr, sister of Henry's last wife Catherine Parr. Henry heaped favours and honours (a knighthood) upon Herbert and granted him the estates of Wilton, Remesbury (north Wiltshire), and Cardiff Castle.

=== 19th century ===
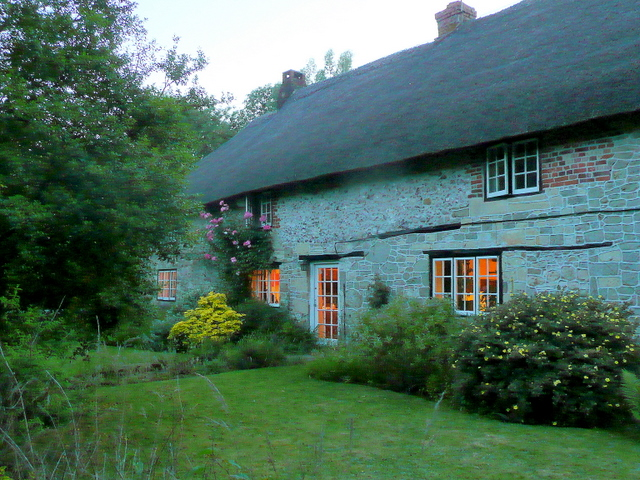
Cottage, Bowerchalke

Chalke was a comparatively large, disconnected estate that was separated into the two ecclesiastical parishes of Broad Chalk and Bowerchalke in 1880. In 1885, 283 acres were transferred to Bower Chalke from Fifield Bavant, increasing its area to 3,260 acres (1,319 ha).

From 1878 until 1924 a unique village newspaper was written, printed, published and sold for a farthing by the Reverend Edward Collett, documenting the social history of the village. Two original sets of the papers still exist. One set is retained by Bodleian Library at Oxford and the second is on loan to the Wiltshire and Swindon Archives by its custodian Paul Lee, where it can be viewed in their offices at Chippenham. The papers were researched and published by Rex Sawyer as The Bowerchalke Parish Papers in 1989 after he had discovered the original printing press in his garden. In 2004 they were republished by The Hobnob Press as Collett's Farthing Newspaper: the Bowerchalke Village Newspaper, 1878–1924. (ISBN 0-946418-22-5). Collett was also a keen amateur photographer and the majority of the photographs featured in the book are from his album.

=== 20th century ===
In 1919 Reginald Herbert, 15th Earl of Pembroke started to sell the individual farms.

The village school closed in 1976 and children from Bowerchalke now attend the school in neighbouring Broad Chalke. The old school buildings now serve as the Village Hall. The village pub, The Bell Inn, closed in 1988 and is now a residential dwelling known as Bell House.

The once renowned village cricket team, thanks in part to the dynasty of 'cricketing Gullivers' (Brian, David, Derek, Richard and Robin), closed c. 1973/74.

=== 21st century ===
The village post office and general stores closed in 2003. The nearest post office is in Broad Chalke. An article about the closures called Village of the Damned, written by David McKie, was published in The Guardian on 30 June 2005. A response titled Bowerchalke is not the village of the Damned was written by Will Heaven, Assistant Comment Editor of The Daily Telegraph on 30 August 2009.

In 2010 the Chalke Valley Cricket Club moved their cricket ground from the Chalke Valley Sports Centre in Broad Chalke to a new ground at Butt's Field, Bowerchalke, behind the Church under Marleycombe Hill, to allow a longer season and better facilities.

In 2011 Bowerchalke's new cricket ground became the main venue for the first annual Chalke Valley History Festival, co-organised by local author James Holland.

== Religious sites ==
=== Parish church ===
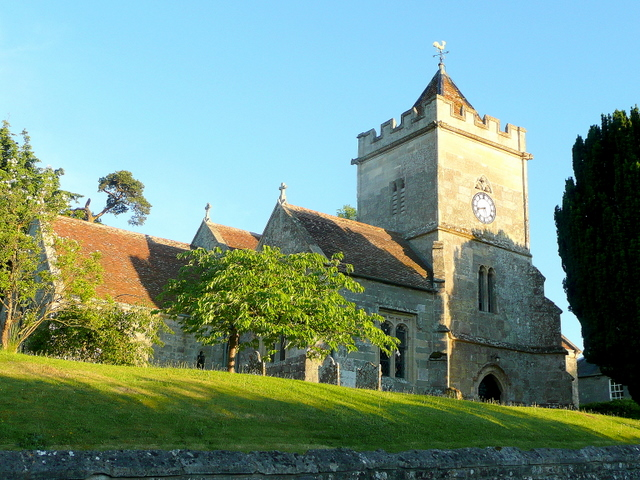
Holy Trinity Church

A church was built at Bowerchalke c.1300. Pevsner and Orbach assess the style of the transept arches, and lancet windows in the nave and chancel, as consistent with that date, indicating that the building's cruciform plan was already in place. The north tower, with porch below, was added in the 15th century; the upper stage of the tower was rebuilt higher in the 19th century. The 16th century saw the addition of the north chapel (now used as the vestry) and the rebuilding of the transepts.

Restoration in 1886 by T.H. Wyatt included the rebuilding of the chancel and the addition of the south aisle. The roofs, pulpit, pews and polychrome tiled floor are all 19th-century work. The church was designated as Grade II* listed in 1960.

The plain stone bowl of the font is 12th-century. There is a stone memorial to Alice Good (died 1735) and other tablets of the same family from the late 17th century and 18th century. The heaviest of the ring of bells was cast c.1400 at Salisbury, and another is dated 1611. In 1999 a new frame was installed and the number of bells increased from three to five.

Before and after the church was built, the area was part of the large Broad Chalke parish. Burials continued to take place at Broad Chalke until 1506. From the 16th century the living was a combined vicarage of Broad Chalke with Bower Chalke and Alvediston; in 1880 a separate perpetual curacy was created for Bowerchalke. The living was reunited with Broad Chalke in 1952 and a group ministry was formed in 1972; today the parish is part of the Chalke Valley group, alongside twelve others.

=== Baptist church ===
A small chapel was built in stone in 1863–4, close to the church. In 1897 a larger chapel was built next to it in red brick, and the older building converted to a schoolroom. The chapel was still in use in 2007.

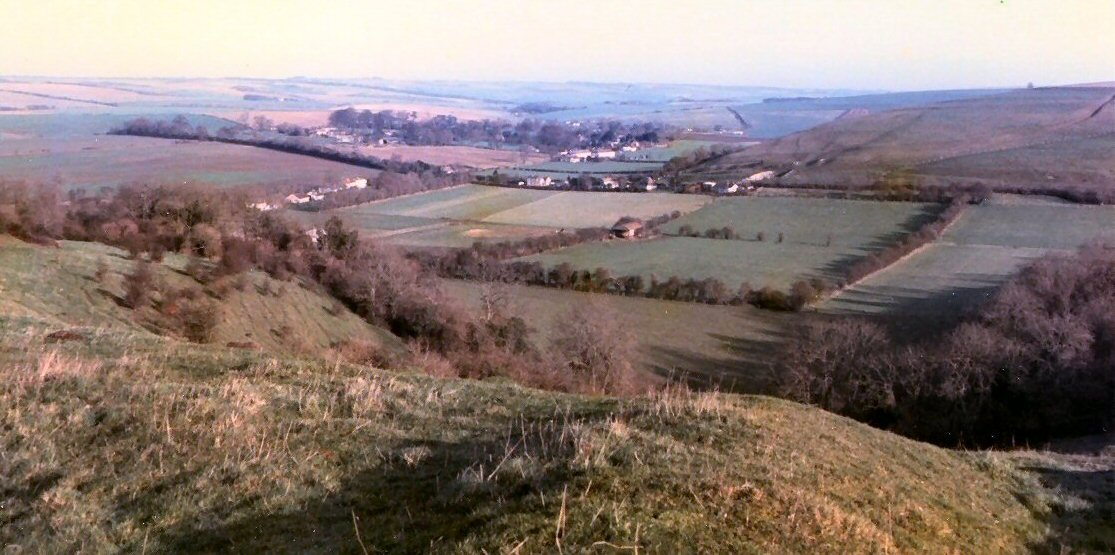
Bowerchalke and the Chalke Valley, looking north-east from the top of the chalk escarpment

== Amenities ==
Marleycombe Down, Knowle Down and Woodminton Down are chalk grasslands which comprise the entire southern outlook of the village. They are jointly known as the Bowerchalke Downs, a 318-acre (129 ha) Site of Special Scientific Interest with many species of plants, insects and butterflies.

The slopes of Marleycombe Down are used for hang gliding and paragliding.

The RSPB's Garston Wood nature reserve lies immediately beyond the southern boundary of the parish.

== Notable people ==
- John Drew, schoolteacher, astronomer and meteorologist, was born at Bower Chalke in 1809.
- William Thick was born in 1845 at Misselfore Green but left the village in 1868 to join the Metropolitan Police at Whitechapel in London (warrant number 49989). In 1889, while investigating the Whitechapel murders, Sergeant Thick was named in letters as a prospective perpetrator, to wit I have very good grounds to believe that the person who has committed the Whitechapel Murders is a member of the police force. ... Sergeant William Thick. (He is no longer a suspect.)
- Anglo-Canadian poet Marjorie Pickthall (1883–1922) lived in Bowerchalke from 1913 to 1919, spending summers at Chalke Cottage where she wrote prolifically. She also attempted to start an enterprise in market gardening as part of the war effort.
- The Nobel Prize winning novelist William Golding, author of Lord of the Flies, The Inheritors, etc. is buried in the village churchyard, having lived the middle part of his life in a cottage on the banks of the River Chalke. He named the Gaia hypothesis which was conceived by his walking companion Dr James Lovelock who lived in the village from c. 1960–1980 at both Pixies Cottage at Misselfore and at Clovers Cottage, Mead End.
- International violinist Iona Brown lived in the village at Misselfore Cottage from 1968 until her death in 2004. When she took part in the BBC Radio 4 programme Kaleidoscope, explaining how hard it was to play her signature piece The Lark Ascending by Ralph Vaughan Williams, she said that the singing of larks she heard during long walks on nearby Marleycombe Down influenced the way she played it.

== Geology ==
The rocks of Bowerchalke that can be seen today were deposited underwater between 120 and 70 million years ago (mya) until they were then uplifted from the sea and have been sculpted by periglacial weathering and erosion over the last 1 million years.

The unseen underlying rocks of Bowerchalke started to form in shallow seas surrounding volcanic islands up to 1,000 million years ago (Proterozoic), about 60-70 degrees south of the equator, the latitude of present-day Argentina. 'Proto-Bowerchalke' and the rest of England and Wales are part of Avalonia, a micro-continent that broke away from the southern landmass, and was 50 degrees south of the equator about 500 mya. It joined with Baltica just south of the equator 400 mya, and was crushed between Baltica, and Laurasia (North America), and Gondwanaland (Africa, Australia, Antarctica and South America) 350 mya whilst near the equator (Variscan orogeny). Avalonia was landlocked and buffeted within Pangaea just north of the equator 270 mya, and became part of a desert in the northern tropics 230 mya. Eventually it formed the west coast of Eurasia as America split away to form the Atlantic Ocean 120 mya. Bowerchalke then laid under warm chalk forming seas until being uplifted 70 mya as Africa started to collide with the European plate in the (Alpine Orogeny), and in the cooler shallow water river clay sediments capped the chalk. In the last million years the periglacial weathering has completely removed several hundred feet of chalk.

The main portion of the village is formed on the unique 'Bowerchalke greensand inlier' (an area of older rock completely surrounded by younger layers), highlighted in green on the adjacent map. It is not immediately obvious to the naked eye or on the standard Ordnance Survey maps with 10 metre contours but the apex is strikingly characterised by the 'island' drawn on the Andrews' and Dury's 1773 map. Its presence can be detected in the friable sandy soils in the centre of the village.

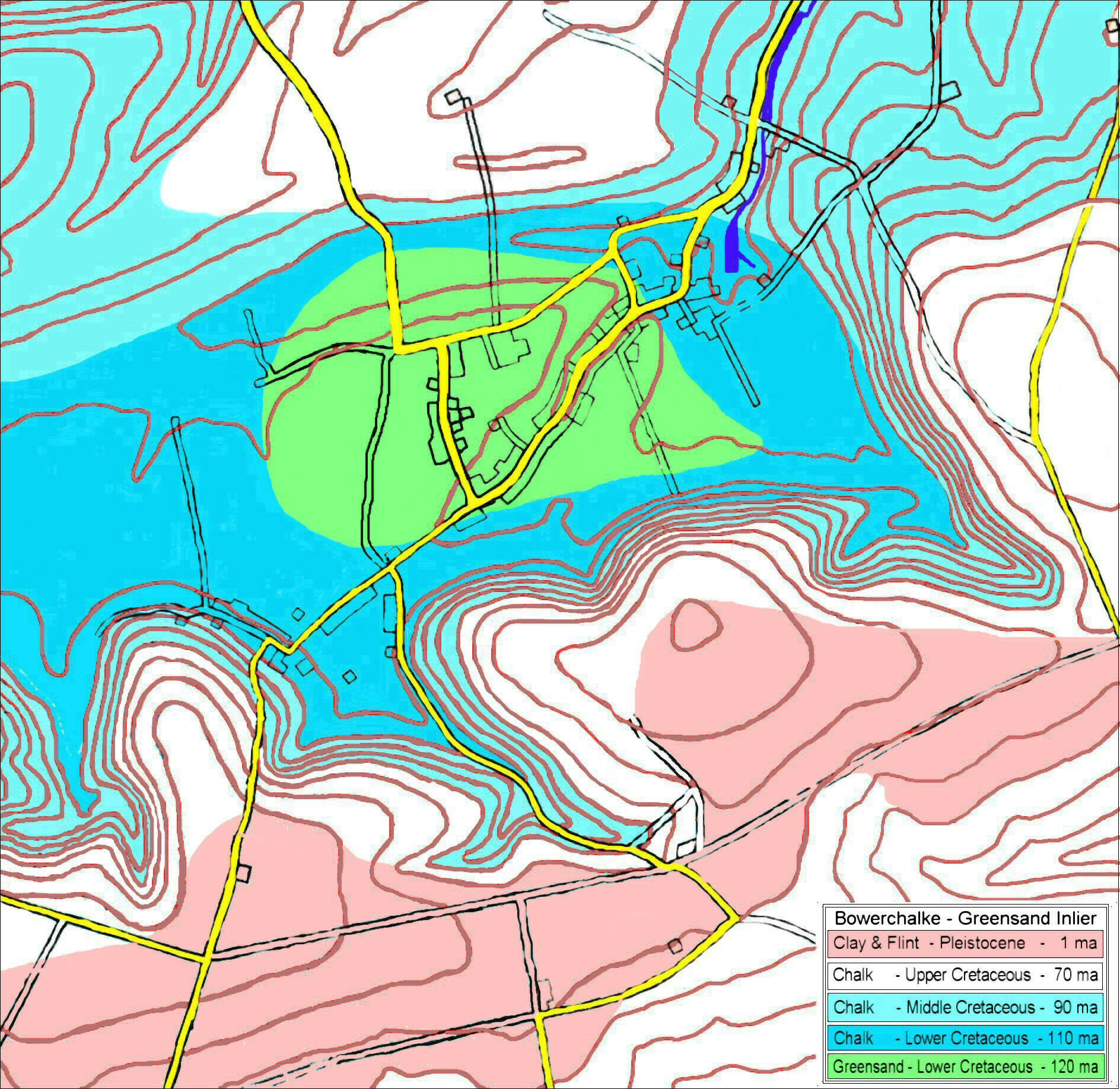
Geological overview of Bowerchalke

The Greensand inlier is a dome shaped area of hard, coarse, olive-green coloured sandstone rock which has had its covering of softer chalk eroded away by 60 million years of weathering since the region was lifted out of the sea. The Cretaceous Upper Greensand is about 120 million years old and was deposited in brackish, oxygen depleted, water when Bowerchalke was located at around 35 degrees north of the equator, roughly equivalent to southern Spain and Portugal. At that time it was still part of the supercontinent Pangea which was just starting to split and form the Atlantic Ocean. The nearest continuous Upper Greensand exposure is along the A30 in the Nadder valley at Fovant. The closest 'unique greensand inlier' is near Andover in Hampshire.

Surrounding the greensand is a ring of younger Lower Cretaceous Chalk which is about 100 million years old (darker blue on the adjacent map). The chalk was formed in warm, shallow, well oxygenated waters from the remains of micro-organisms (coccolithophores), over millions of years. At this time the Atlantic Ocean was about 100 miles wide and Ireland, Scotland, Wales and Somerset were a single island with rivers draining their nutrients into the warm sea that covered Wiltshire, Hampshire, the east of England, Northern France, Denmark and northern Germany.

Surrounding the lower chalk is a ringlike region of still younger Middle Cretaceous chalk (about 80 my)(light blue on the adjacent map). The whole area is bounded by the 'vast expanse' of Upper Cretaceous chalk (shown white on the adjacent map) that continued to form when Bowerchalke was about 45 degrees north, roughly equivalent to Bordeaux or the Dordogne in France. It was still under a shallow sea but Somerset, Ireland and Scotland had become separate islands. Bowerchalke was probably 15–30 miles offshore from the 'coast' between Shaftesbury and Dorchester.

Above the exposed Cretaceous chalk slopes of Marleycombe the hilltops are covered with a very young layer of Pleistocene 'clay with flint' that is about 1–10 million years old and formed by alluvial sediments in cold shallow waters (pink on the adjacent map). The flints were formed in multiple layers as the clay sediment built up, and were then concentrated into a single dense layer as the last million years of sub glacial weathering washed the minute clay particles away.

The steepness of the north facing Marleycombe Down contrasts with the gentle rolling slopes towards Ebbesbourne Wake. This is mainly due to erosion during the sustained permafrost and tundra-like conditions in the periglacial zones of multiple ice ages. Although the southern limit of the main glaciation is a line across North Wiltshire that corresponds to the M4 corridor, the sun rarely melted the north-facing snow pockets on Marlecombe Down, thus they eroded the soft chalks and clays by eating back into them, leaving the very steep scarp faces. The sporadic melting of snow and ice was forced to drain north east along the course of the River Chalke and River Ebble in occasional summers, plus scouring the now dry channel that forms Church Street and Costers Lane. The southern boundary between the greensand and chalk is concealed beneath a layer of heavy clay that has accumulated at the bottom of Marleycombe Down due to the periglacial solifluction. This scouring has also created the natural spring that supplies the River Chalke, whereby the rainfall from the surrounding watershed, having been filtered and channelled through the porous chalk, rises at the natural spring at 'Mead End' where the water table sits on the underlying impervious greensand layer.
