= John Drew (astronomer) =

English astronomer (1809–1857)

John Drew (1809 – 17 December 1857) was a self-educated English astronomer.

== Early life and education ==
Drew was born at Bower Chalke, Wiltshire, in 1809. His father died when Drew was only a year old. Drew was self-educated, and was so successful at this that by the age of fifteen he was prepared to teach professionally. He spent two years as an assistant in a school at Melksham, after which he moved to Southampton, where he taught for another sixteen years. He was a corresponding member of the Philosophical Institute of Basel, and had taken a degree of doctor in philosophy at the university of the same place.

== Career ==
Drew's first celestial observations were made with a three and a half foot refractor. In 1847, he installed a five-foot achromatic telescope by Dollond, mounted equatorially, in a small observatory he built for the purpose in his garden. With the help of a transit circle by Jones and of the Beaufoy clock, lent by the Royal Astronomical Society, he very accurately determined the time, and supplied it during many years to the ships leaving Southampton.

He published a number of papers on astronomy, geology, and meteorology. At the Southampton meeting of the British Association in 1846, Drew was appointed one of the secretaries of the mathematical section, and printed for the use of the association a pamphlet ‘On the Objects worthy of Attention in an Excursion round the Isle of Wight, including an Account of the Geological Formations as exhibited in the Sections along the Coast’. On 9 January 1846, he was elected a member of the Royal Astronomical Society.

Between 1848 and 1853, he took systematic meteorological observations, and summarised the results in two papers on the ‘Climate of Southampton’, read before the British Association in 1851 and 1854 respectively. Invited to assist in the foundation of the Meteorological Society in 1850, he wrote a series of papers ‘On the Instruments used in Meteorology, and on the Deductions from the Observations’ which were extensively circulated among the members of the society, and formed the groundwork of a treatise on ‘Practical Meteorology’, published by Drew in 1855, and re-edited by his son in 1860.

His last work was a set of astronomical diagrams, published by the Department of Science and Art in 1857, representing the moon, planets, starclusters, nebulæ, and other celestial objects.

== Death ==
Drew died after a long illness at Surbiton in Surrey, on 17 December 1857, aged 48.

== Publications ==
- ‘Practical Meteorology’ (1855)
- ‘On the Instruments used in Meteorology, and on the Deductions from the Observations’ (1850)
- ‘Climate of Southampton’ (1851) and (1854)
- ‘Telescopic Appearance of the Planet Venus at the time of her Inferior Conjunction, 28 Feb. 1854’ (ib. xv. 69)
- ‘Chronological Charts illustrative of Ancient History and Geography’ (1835)
- ‘A Manual of Astronomy: a Popular Treatise on Descriptive, Physical, and Practical Astronomy, with a familiar Explanation of Astronomical Instruments, and the best methods of using them’ (1845)
- ‘On the Objects worthy of Attention in an Excursion round the Isle of Wight, including an Account of the Geological Formations as exhibited in the Sections along the Coast’ (1846)
