= Alvediston Manor =

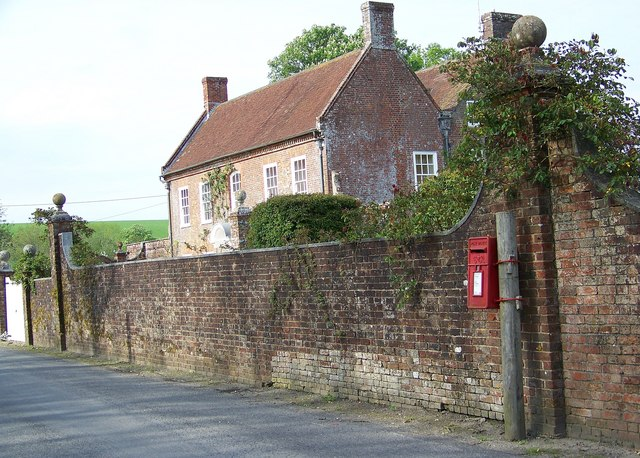

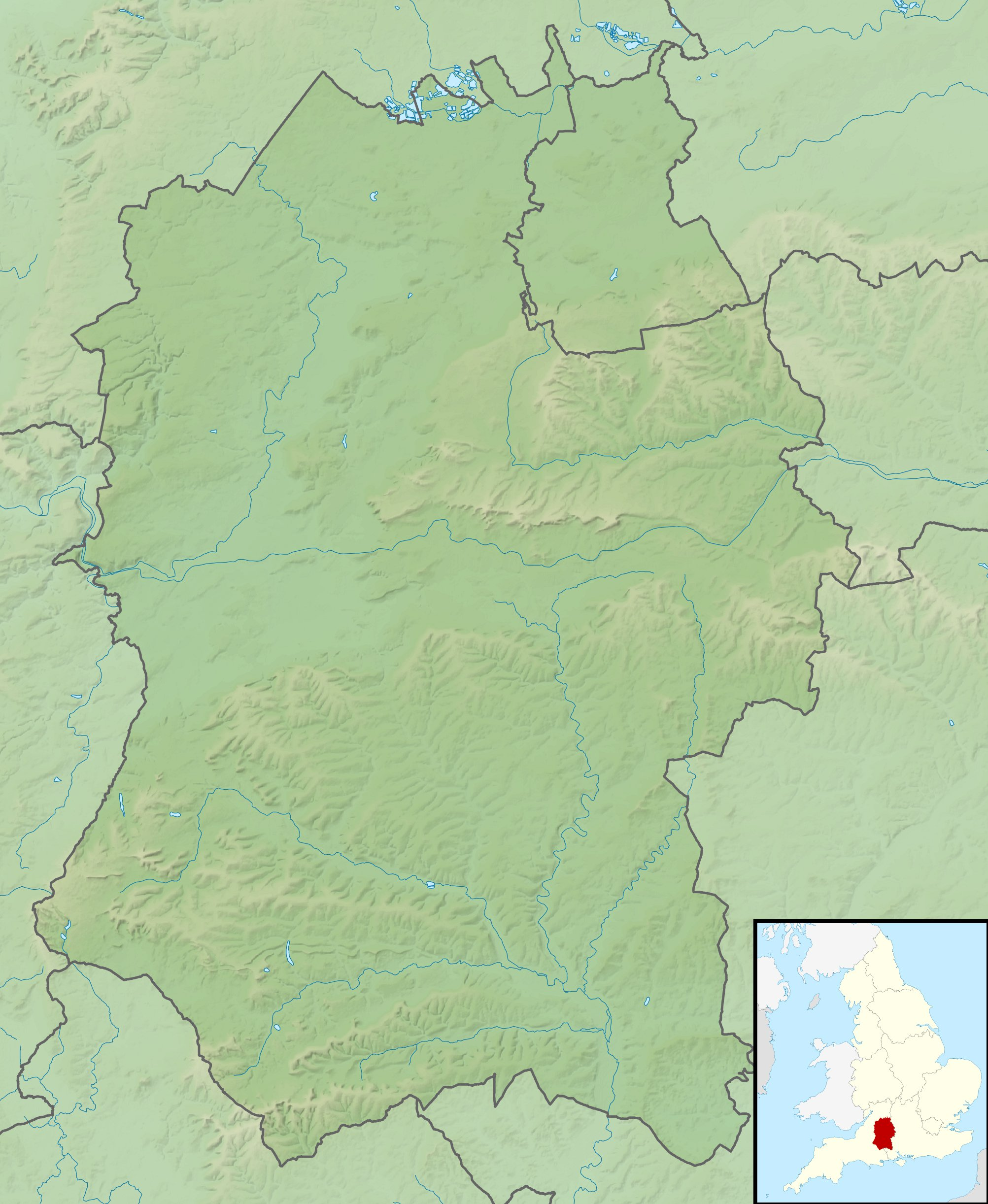
- Location within Wiltshire
- 51.0114°N 2.0352°W
- Type: House
- Location: Alvediston, Wiltshire

History
- Built: c.1750

Listed Building – Grade II
- Official name: The Manor, Alvediston
- Designated: 6 January 1966
- Reference no.: 1130703

Listed Building – Grade II
- Official name: Walls, gates and gate piers to the front of Alvediston Manor
- Designated: 27 July 1985
- Reference no.: 1130704

Listed Building – Grade II
- Official name: Garages at Alvediston Manor
- Designated: 27 July 1985
- Reference no.: 1318669

Alvediston Manor, Alvediston, Wiltshire, England is an 18th-century house. From 1968 until his death in 1977, it was the home of the former prime minister Anthony Eden. The manor is a Grade II listed building.

== History and description ==
The manor house at Alvediston dates from the mid-18th century. Nikolaus Pevsner, in his Buildings of England, notes that the house is "of brick, in a stone county". It is of two storeys and is five bays wide and stands in the centre of the village. In 1968, the house was bought by Anthony Eden, using funds from the sale of his memoirs. His wife, Clarissa, designed the garden and Eden kept a small herd of Hereford cattle at the farm he purchased at the same time. (Note: Clarissa Eden recorded her husband's pride in becoming President of the Hereford Herd Book Society; "He was always able to pick out a good animal for stud. They all looked the same to me".) In 1975, his last volume of memoirs, Another World, was written at Alvediston. Eden died at the house on 14 January 1977 and is buried in the village churchyard.

Alvediston is a Grade II Listed building, with the garages, and the garden walls, which Pevsner noted were "nicely curved", and the gates and gate piers having separate Grade II listings.

== Sources ==
- Eden, Clarissa (2007). Haste, Cate (ed.). Clarissa Eden: A Memoir - From Churchill to Eden. London: Weidenfeld & Nicolson. ISBN 9780297851936. OCLC 153554371.
- Pevsner, Nikolaus; Cherry, Bridget (2002). Wiltshire. The Buildings Of England. New Haven, US and London: Yale University Press. ISBN 9780300096590. OCLC 49298090.
- Rhodes James, Robert (1986). Anthony Eden: A Biography. London: Weidenfeld & Nicolson. ISBN 9780297789895. OCLC 185680845.
