= Bowerchalke Downs =

Protected area in Wiltshire, England

Coordinates: 50.9956°N 1.9957°W

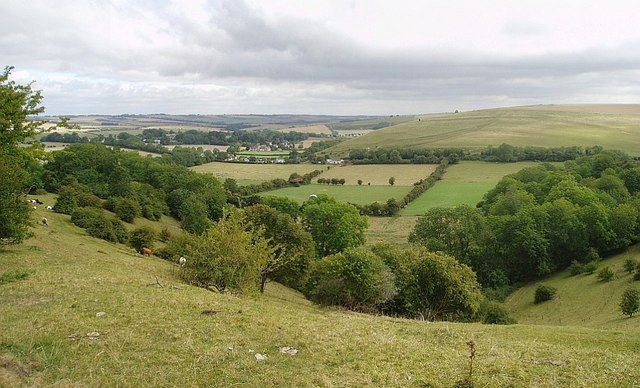
Looking towards Bowerchalke from Woodminton Down

Bowerchalke Downs (grid reference SU004218) (also known as Woodminton, Marleycombe Down and Knowle Down), is a 134 hectares (330 acres) biological Site of Special Scientific Interest in southern Wiltshire, England, notified in 1971.

The downs encompass the entire southern outlook of the village of Bowerchalke, about 9 miles (14 km) south-west of Salisbury, and are adjacent to both the Hampshire and Dorset county boundaries. The Bowerchalke Downs lie within the Cranborne Chase and West Wiltshire Downs Area of Outstanding Natural Beauty and are part of the Southern England Chalk Formation.

The English Nature citation from 1971 states that the site has an extensive area of floristically rich chalk grassland. Among the diverse plant species are sheep's-fescue Festuca ovina, meadow oat-grass Avenula pratensis, and dwarf sedge Carex humilis.
