= Ebbesbourne Wake =

Village in Wiltshire, England

Coordinates: 51.017°N 2.013°W

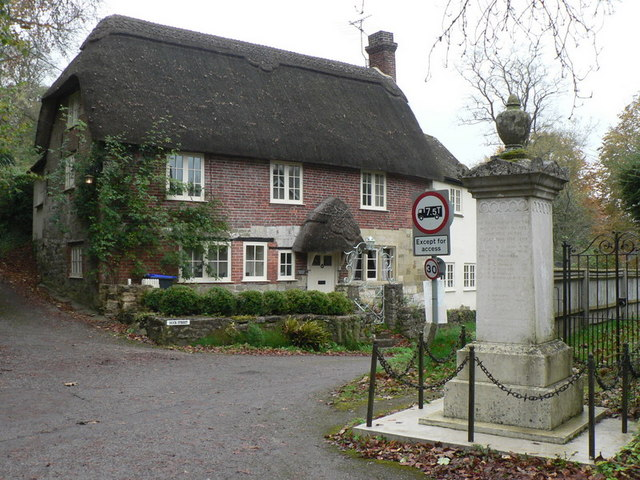
- War memorial and Old Forge Cottage, Ebbesbourne Wake

- Location within Wiltshire
- Population: 222 (in 2011)
- OS grid reference: ST992242
- Civil parish: Ebbesborne Wake
- Unitary authority: Wiltshire
- Ceremonial county: Wiltshire
- Region: South West
- Country: England
- Sovereign state: United Kingdom
- Post town: Salisbury
- Postcode district: SP5
- Dialling code: 01722
- Police: Wiltshire
- Fire: Dorset and Wiltshire
- Ambulance: South Western
- UK Parliament: Salisbury
- Website: Parish Council

Ebbesbourne Wake or Ebbesborne Wake is a village and civil parish in Wiltshire, England, some 10 miles (16 km) south-west of Salisbury, near the head of the valley of the small River Ebble. The parish includes the hamlets of Fifield Bavant and West End. In 2011 the parish had a population of 222.

== History ==
Records from Saxon times, about 826 CE, show that the Chalke Valley area was thriving. The village name of Eblesburna was probably derived from a man called Ebbel, who may have owned land near the bourne (stream) – the word bourne derives from the Old English "brunna".

Ebbesbourne appears in the Latin will of a Dorset woman, Wynflæd, the earliest will of a woman to survive in English history, described as "a small stained sheet of parchment". The detailed terms bequeath to her daughter Æthelflœd an engraved bracelet, a brooch, some named household articles including books, and "the farm at Ebbesbourne with the title deed as a perpetual inheritance... and the men and the livestock on the land there to her too." The will was put on display at the British Library in late 2018–early 2019.

The Domesday Book of 1086 divided the Chalke Valley into eight manors: Chelke (Chalke - Bowerchalke and Broadchalke), Eblesborne (Ebbesbourne Wake), Fifehide (Fifield), Cumbe (Coombe Bissett), Humitone (Homington), Odestoche (Odstock), Stradford (Stratford Tony and Bishopstone) and Trow (roughly Alvediston and Tollard Royal).

Peter Meers, in his book Ebbesbourne Wake through the Ages, translates the village's Domesday entry as:

Robert holds Eblesborne from Robert. Aluard and Fitheus held it before 1066 as two manors. (TRE = tempore Regis Edwardii, the time of Edward the Confessor, 1042–1066) Taxed for 14 hides.

Land for ten ploughs. In lordship ten hides, there six ploughs. Four slaves (serfs). Eighteen villeins (villagers). Seven bordars (smallholders) with four ploughs. Fourteen acres of meadow, pasture fourteen furlongs long, 4 furlongs wide. Woodlands two leagues length and width. Value £12, now £14.

Geoffrey de Wak became Lord of the manor in 1204; although his kinship to Hereward the Wake is unknown, the shield of Hereward can today be seen on the church tower. By 1249 the settlement name was written Ebbelburn Wak and by 1785 Ebesborne Wake.

In the 12th century the wider area was known mainly as the Stowford Hundred, then later as the Chalke Hundred. It covered the parishes of Berwick St John, Ebbesbourne Wake, Fifield Bavant, Semley, Tollard Royal and 'Chalke'.

The spelling of Ebbesbourne Wake continued to vary. The Ordnance Survey of 1889 and 1927 used "Ebbesborne Wake", while the 1963 and 1974 maps retained "Ebbesborne" for the parish but gave Ebbesbourne Wake for the village. Historian Peter Meers notes in Ebbesbourne Wake through the Ages that the 1926 and 1965 editions of Fowler's A Dictionary of Modern English Usage call the general spelling of "bourne/borne" inconsistent.

Manor Farmhouse is from the 17th century, with rebuilding and additions in the 18th and 19th. A National School was opened in or before 1846; a schoolroom was built in 1854 and a teacher's house in 1870. The school closed in 1985 due to low pupil numbers.

The civil parish of Fifield Bavant was merged into Ebbesbourne Wake parish in 1894.

== Parish church ==
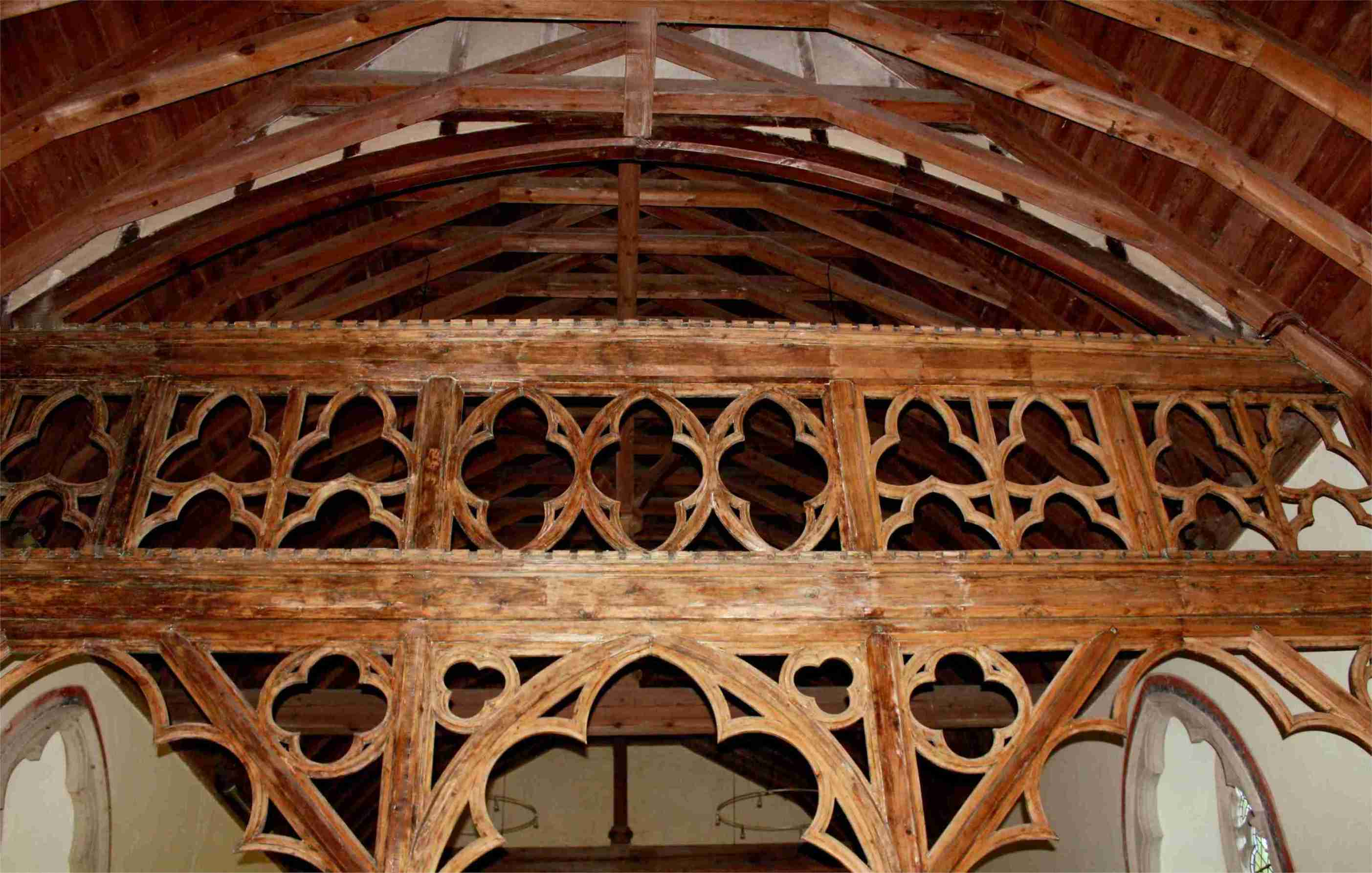
Ebbesbourne St John's: wooden screen and beams in the nave

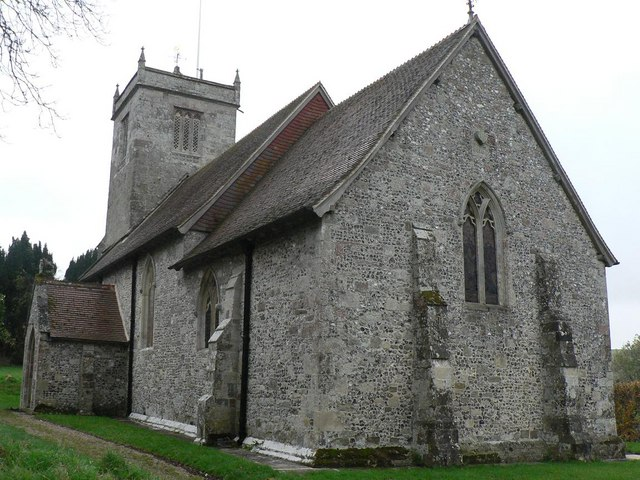
St John's Church

There has been a church at Ebbesbourne Wake since the 13th century. The present one dedicated to St John the Baptist is largely 14th-century, with 13th-century window details and a 12th-century font.

The tower has five bells, of which four are from the 17th century. The building was designated as Grade II* listed in 1960.

From 1859 the Vicar of Ebbesbourne doubled as Rector of Fifield Bavant, and in 1923 the two parishes were united. In 1970 the benefice was united also with Alvediston. Today the parish is part of the Chalke Valley group.

== Chapel ==
An independent meeting house was established in 1782 at a cottage called Buntings. In about 1791, the congregation moved to a former coach house belonging to the Earl of Pembroke, not far from the church. In 1857 a stone chapel was built on the same site.

== Local government ==
The civil parish has an elected parish council. It falls within the Wiltshire Council unitary authority, which is responsible for all significant local government functions.

== Amenities ==
The village has a village hall and a public house, the Horseshoe Inn. The village is served by Monday–Saturday daytime buses between Shaftesbury and Salisbury. Salisbury also has the nearest railway station (12.5 miles, 20 km).
