= SP postcode area =

Postcode area within the United Kingdom

Salisbury
- Postcode area
- Coordinates: 51.104°N 1.793°W
- Country: United Kingdom
- Postcode area: SP
- Postcode area name: Salisbury
- Post towns: 6
- Postcode districts: 11
- Postcode sectors: 47
- Postcodes (live): 8,571
- Postcodes (total): 11,348
- Statistics as at May 2020

The SP postcode area, also known as the Salisbury postcode area, is a group of eleven postcode districts in southern England, within six post towns. These cover south Wiltshire (including Salisbury and Tidworth) and parts of north Dorset (including Gillingham and Shaftesbury) and west Hampshire (including Andover and Fordingbridge).

The letters in the postcode refer to the Salisbury Plain, a plateau within the postcode area.

== Coverage ==
The approximate coverage of the postcode districts:

Postcode district	Post town	Coverage	Local authority area(s)
SP1	SALISBURY	Central Salisbury and northern suburbs: Laverstock, Stratford-sub-Castle	Wiltshire
SP2	SALISBURY	Salisbury west suburbs, Quidhampton, Netherhampton, Wilton, Great Wishford	Wiltshire
SP3	SALISBURY	Tisbury, Shrewton, Hindon, Chilmark, East Knoyle, Dinton	Wiltshire
SP4	SALISBURY	Amesbury, Durrington, Laverstock and Ford	Wiltshire
SP5	SALISBURY	Rural parishes southwest, south and east of Salisbury: Alderbury, Alvediston, Ashmore, Bishopstone, Bowerchalke, Britford, Broad Chalke, Clarendon, Coombe Bissett, Downton, Ebbesbourne Wake, Grimstead, Landford, Odstock, Pitton, Redlynch, Sixpenny Handley, Stratford Tony, Tollard Royal, West Dean, West Tytherley, Whiteparish, Winterslow	Dorset, Wiltshire, New Forest
SP6	FORDINGBRIDGE	Fordingbridge, Alderholt, Rockbourne, Martin	New Forest, Dorset
SP7	SHAFTESBURY	Shaftesbury, Compton Abbas, Fontmell Magna, Donhead St Andrew, Donhead St Mary, Berwick St John, Motcombe	Dorset, Wiltshire
SP8	GILLINGHAM	Gillingham, Stour Provost, East Stour, West Stour, Kington Magna, Buckhorn Weston, Milton on Stour, Bourton	Dorset
SP9	TIDWORTH	Tidworth, Shipton Bellinger	Wiltshire, Test Valley
SP10	ANDOVER	Andover town	Test Valley
SP11	ANDOVER	Outskirts of Andover and surrounding villages; also Longparish, Grateley, Thruxton, Ludgershall	Test Valley, Basingstoke and Deane, Wiltshire

== Map ==
SP postcode area map, showing postcode districts in red and post towns in grey text, with links to nearby BA, BH, DT, RG, SN and SO postcode areas.

== See also ==
- Postcode Address File
- List of postcode areas in the United Kingdom
