= Garston Wood =

Nature reserve in Dorset, England

- IUCN category IV (habitat/species management area)
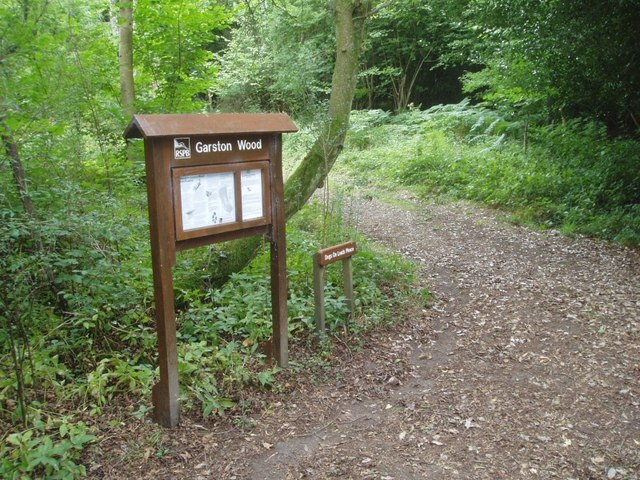
- Information board in Garston Wood
- Interactive map of Garston Wood
- Location: Deanland, Sixpenny Handley, Dorset, England
- Coordinates: 50°58′24″N 01°59′45″W
- Area: 34 hectares (84 acres)
- Established: 1985
- Governing body: RSPB
- Website: RSPB Garston Wood

Garston Wood is a 34-hectare (84-acre) woodland nature reserve in Cranborne Chase, Dorset, England, near the boundary with Wiltshire. It is at grid reference SU004190, around 15 km SE of Shaftesbury and around 3 km (2 mi) north of the village of Sixpenny Handley, owned by the Royal Society for the Protection of Birds to protect species living in the region. The reserve is a mixture of ancient woodland and managed coppices and scrubland. To help maintain the park, the RSPB sets annual population targets for certain breeding pairs of birds, and manages the forest by clearing out taller and non-native trees.

In an effort to help tourists and volunteers enjoy the park, the RSPB holds an annual event programme, biannual volunteer working parties, and publishes a regularly updated trail guide. They also work to improve their visitor facilities, and maintain a media profile.

== Fauna ==
=== Birds ===
Blackcaps, Eurasian bullfinches, garden warblers, marsh tits, tawny owls, Eurasian nuthatches, common nightingales, and spotted flycatchers are among the bird species which frequent the park, drawing in birdwatchers.

=== Butterflies ===
Butterflies found in Garston Wood include the speckled wood, silver-washed fritillary, meadow brown, small white, ringlet, brimstone, peacock and gatekeeper and comma.

=== Deer ===
There are five species of deer in Garston Wood, including fallow deer.

== Flora ==
Several species of orchid thrive in Garston Wood, along with lesser celandine, butcher's broom, wood anemone, dog violet, primrose, wild garlic, the rare toothwort and bluebells. Trees include oak, beech, hazel (which is coppiced), and a species of ash tree which is suffering from dieback.

== Visitors ==
There is a free RSPB car park near the northeastern corner of the wood and a network of trails accessible to the public. There are RSPB leaflets at the car park with information and a map of the wood. Dogs must be kept under close control and are only allowed on public footpaths and bridleways.
