= Broad Chalke =

Village and civil parish in Wiltshire, England

Coordinates: 51.028°N 1.943°W

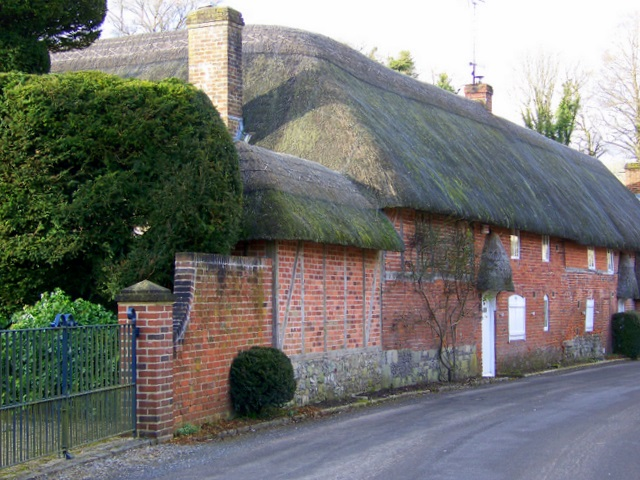
- Reddish House Cottages, Broad Chalke

- Location within Wiltshire
- Population: 655
- OS grid reference: SU 039 255
- Civil parish: Broad Chalke
- Unitary authority: Wiltshire
- Ceremonial county: Wiltshire
- Region: South West
- Country: England
- Sovereign state: United Kingdom
- Post town: Salisbury
- Postcode district: SP5
- Dialling code: 01722
- Police: Wiltshire
- Fire: Dorset and Wiltshire
- Ambulance: South Western
- UK Parliament: Salisbury
- Website: Parish Council

Broad Chalke, sometimes spelled Broadchalke, Broad Chalk or Broadchalk, is a village and civil parish in Wiltshire, England, about 8 miles (13 km) west of the city of Salisbury. The civil parish includes the hamlets of Knapp, Mount Sorrel and Stoke Farthing.

== Geography ==
Broad Chalke is in the Cranborne Chase and West Wiltshire Downs Area of Outstanding Natural Beauty and is halfway along the 13 miles (21 km) Chalke Valley. The parish has two chalk streams, as the River Chalke flows into the River Ebble at Mount Sorrell in the parish, and the main settlement stands on the banks of the Ebble.

The valley road runs from Salisbury in the east to Shaftesbury in the west between chalk downs on either side. The village sits at a crossroads where a road from Hampshire in the south runs down Knowle Hill and another route from Fovant and Tisbury in the north runs down Compton Down via Fifield Bavant and all roads meet near the public house in North Street. There is also a spur road along the River Chalke valley from Bowerchalke and Sixpenny Handley.

== Religious sites ==
=== Parish church ===
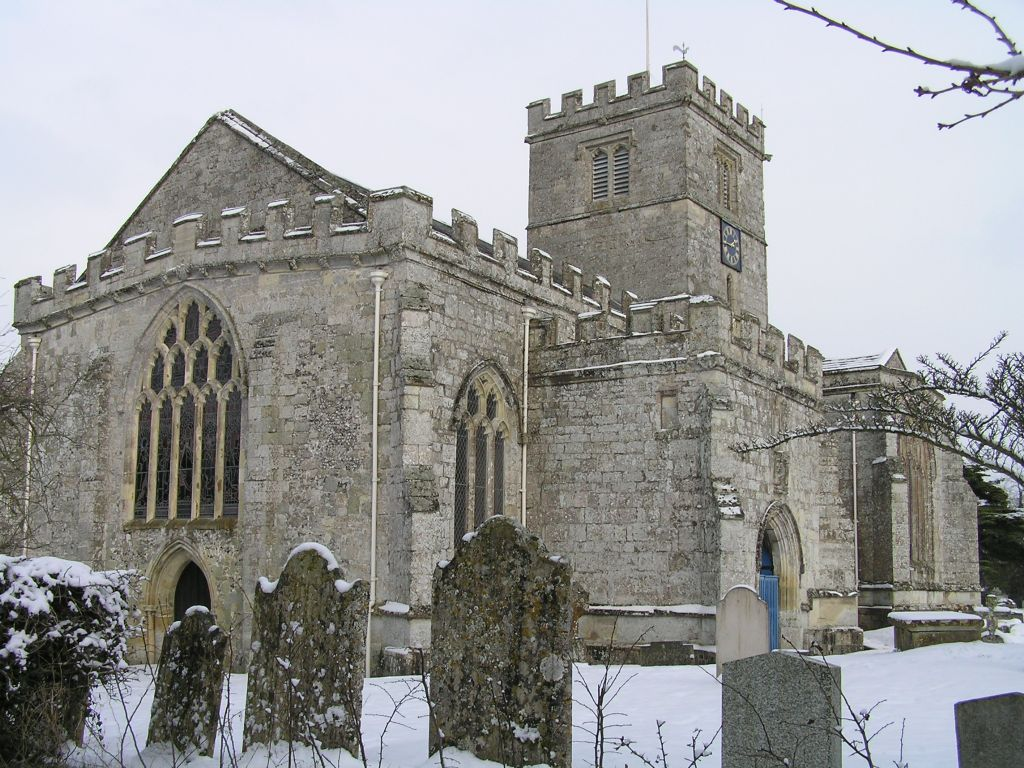
All Saints' Church

The parish church of All Saints is a Grade I listed building. It is from the late 13th and 14th centuries, with a 15th-century porch. Restoration in 1846-7 was by Wyatt and Brandon.

Churches at Alvediston and Bowerchalke were considered to be chapels of the Broad Chalke church, until they became separate parishes in 1861 and 1880 respectively. Broad Chalke and Bowerchalke were united in 1952 and became part of the Chalke Valley team ministry in 1972.

There are eight bells in the church tower, including one from the 14th century. By 1553 there were four bells, with a fifth added in 1616 and a sixth in 1660. Two more were added to mark the end of the 20th century, as part of a renovation funded by the Millennium Commission.

=== Other churches ===
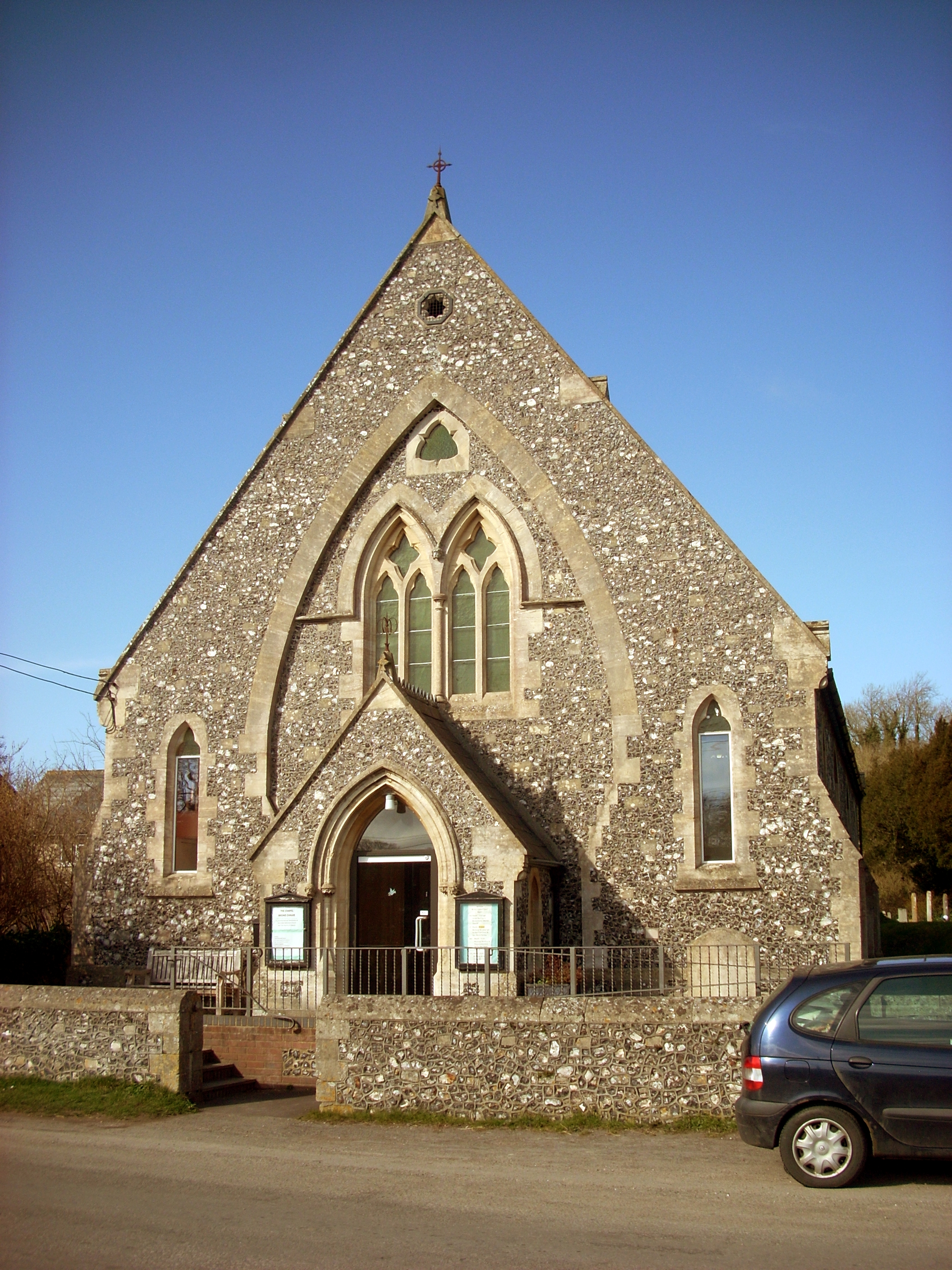
United Reformed Church

A Congregational chapel was built in or before 1801, and replaced by a new church in 1864, which joined the United Reformed Church at its formation in 1972. In 2006 the church was refurbished and divided to provide a community room, then in 2013 the village shop and post office moved into the church. As of 2016, services continue to be held in the church.

Primitive Methodists built a chapel in 1843. The chapel closed c. 1965 and was demolished in 1970.

== Amenities ==
The village has a C of E Primary School and a doctors' surgery. There has been a village hall since 1914 and a Reading Room (also called the Parish Room) on the same site before the village hall was built. The village has a pub, The Queen's Head.

J E Fry & Son, the village shop and Post Office was in South Street and traded as family butchers under the Fry family for almost 100 years. After the closure of the shop and Post Office around Christmas 1992, the butchers began to sell groceries and everyday items and also incorporated the village Post Office which opened within the butchers on 15 June 1993. The shop was featured on BBC South Today as one of the most unusual locations for a Post Office in the region, and the butcher Robert Fry was the subject of ITV's Country Ways programme. He retired on 31 May 2013 and the shop in South Street closed.

Chalke Valley Stores opened in the meeting area of the URC chapel in June 2013. There is a coffee shop in the chapel worship area and an office for the Chalke Valley Community Hub, Chalke Valley Stores, Police, Church Benefice and URC on the balcony, and a village archive on the balcony outside the office.

Watercress has been grown in the River Ebble cressbeds for many years and is sold from the packing station at The Marsh.

=== Sport ===
The Chalke Valley Sports Centre is located in Knighton Road and has a football pitch, tennis courts, skate park and also a multi-use games area (MUGA) for table tennis, short mat bowls, pilates, and other indoor functions.

Chalke Valley Cricket Club is nominally part of the Sports Centre but has its own management and finances and moved to a new ground at Butt's Field, Bowerchalke in 2010.

The Gurston Down speed hill-climb course is at Gurston Farm in Broad Chalke and attracts many hundreds of visitors every year.

== Local government ==
The civil parish elects a parish council. It is in the area of Wiltshire Council unitary authority, which is responsible for most local government functions.

== Notable residents ==
Notable residents of Broad Chalke include:

- John Aubrey (1626–1697), author
- Maurice Henry Hewlett (1861–1923), author
- Reverend Professor Rowland Williams (1817–1870), a theologian whose essays and sermons caused him to be charged with heterodoxy. He was later vicar of Broad Chalke and is buried in All Saints graveyard.
- Sir Anthony Eden (1897–1977), former Prime Minister, later moved to Alvediston

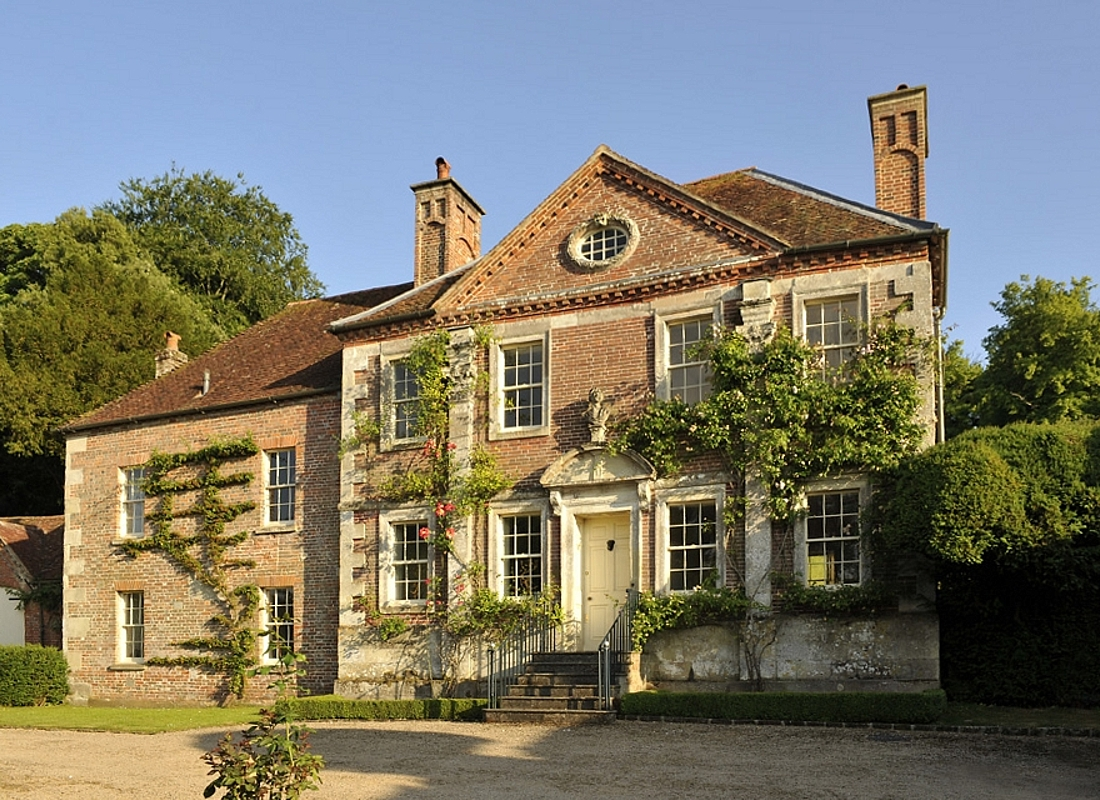
Reddish House in Broad Chalke

- Sir Cecil Beaton (1904–1980), photographer and designer, lived at Reddish House. Beaton entertained and photographed many celebrities in his conservatory. He is buried in All Saints graveyard.
- Toyah Willcox and Robert Fripp, musicians, also lived at Reddish House.
- Dr Lucius Wood, father of the painter Christopher Wood, also lived at Reddish House. Christopher Wood is buried in All Saints graveyard.
- Sir Terry Pratchett (1948–2015), author known for the Discworld series.
- James Holland (born 1970), author and brother of Tom Holland
- Dennis Chalk BEM, musician, bell ringer and conductor
- Herbert Bundy, a local farmer, who was the centre of a landmark case in English contract law on undue influence (Lloyds Bank Ltd v Bundy).

The cricketer John Stevens (1875–1923) was born at Broad Chalke.

== History ==
It is not known when Broad Chalke was first inhabited or what it was called but fragmentary records from Saxon times indicate that the whole Chalke Valley area was thriving.

=== 9th century ===
An Anglo-Saxon charter of 826 records the name of the area including Bowerchalke and Broadchalke as Cealcan gemere.

=== 10th century ===
In 955 the Anglo-Saxon King Eadwig granted the nuns of Wilton Abbey an estate called Chalke which included land in Broad Chalke and Bowerchalke. The charter records the village name as aet Ceolcan. Another charter in 974 records the name as Cheolca or Cheolcam.

=== 11th century ===
The Domesday Book in 1086 divided the Chalke Valley into eight manors: Chelke or Chelce or Celce (Bowerchalke and Broad Chalke), Eblesborne (Ebbesbourne Wake), Fifehide (Fifield), Cumbe (Coombe Bissett), Humitone (Homington), Odestoche (Odstock), Stradford (Stratford Tony and Bishopstone) and Trow (circa Alvediston and Tollard Royal).

=== 12th century ===
In the 12th century the area was known primarily as the Stowford Hundred, then subsequently as the Chalke Hundred. This included the parishes of Berwick St John, Ebbesbourne Wake, Fifield Bavant, Semley, Tollard Royal and 'Chalke'. A charter of 1165 records the village name as Chalca, and the Pipe Rolls in 1174 have it as Chalche.

=== 13th century ===
All Saints' Church was built during the 13th century. The Curia Regis Rolls of 1207 records the village name as ChelkFeet of Fines, and another of 1242 records it as Chalke. The name Burchelke (Bowerchalke) first appeared in 1225.

=== 14th century ===
A Saxon charter of 1304 records the village name as Cheolc and Cheolcan. The Feudal Aids of 1316 uses Chawke, whilst a Saxon Cartulary of 1321 uses Cealce. the Tax lists of 1327, 1332 and 1377 variously record the name as Chalk Magna and Chalke Magna. Brode Chalk was first mentioned in 1380.

=== 15th century ===
The village is recorded in deeds of 1425 as Brodechalke.

=== 16th century ===
Circa 1536 Henry VIII granted Chalke to Sir William Herbert, 1st Earl of Pembroke during the Dissolution of the Monasteries. In 1560 Queen Elizabeth I granted Reddish House and farm to William Reddiche who already owned several properties in the village as a 'Free tenant' of the Earl of Pembroke in Wilton.

A rectory (now Grade II* listed) was built to the west of the church.

The wills of William King (1545) and John Penny (1555) record the village name as Brood Chalke, whilst the Earl of Pembroke surveys of 1567 and 1590 list it as Brodechalke and Broadchalke.

=== 17th century ===
In 1605 the will of Michael Angod spelled the village name as Broadchalk. By 1631 the Earl of Pembroke's survey used the modern form of Broad Chalke, as did the will of John Farrent in 1699. However, the 1671 Dissenters Meeting House Certificates used Broadcholk.

By 1608 the Pembroke estate had also acquired the manors of Knighton and Stoke Farthing. The house called Knighton Manor was built towards the end of the century.

=== 18th century ===
The spelling of Broad Chalke continued to vary; in 1778 the will of Elizabeth Fifield spelled it as Broadchalk, whilst the 1784 will of Richard Follit used Broad Chalk.

=== 19th century ===
Again the spelling of Broad Chalke varied. In 1804 the will of Josiah Gould spelled it as Broad Chalke, whilst the 1830 will of Colt Hoare used Broad Chalk.

By 1846 a cottage served as a National School, and in 1860 a new school and teacher's house were built opposite the church.

Chalke was a comparatively large, disconnected estate that was divided into the two ecclesiastical parishes of Broad Chalk and Bowerchalke in 1880.

=== 20th century ===
In 1919 the Pembroke family started to sell the individual farms.

In 1963 older children began to attend the secondary school at Wilton. Pupil numbers at Broad Chalke increased after the closure of village schools at Bowerchalke and Bishopstone. In the 1990s the school was extended with a hall and a fourth classroom.

The spelling of Broad Chalke continued to vary: the Ordnance Survey maps and village road signs spelled it as Broad Chalke, whilst the Electoral Register used Broadchalke.

=== 21st century ===
In 2007 a new school was built on the eastern outskirts of the village, and the older school became private housing.
