= Coombe Bissett =

Village and civil parish in Wiltshire, England

Coordinates: 51.037°N 1.846°W

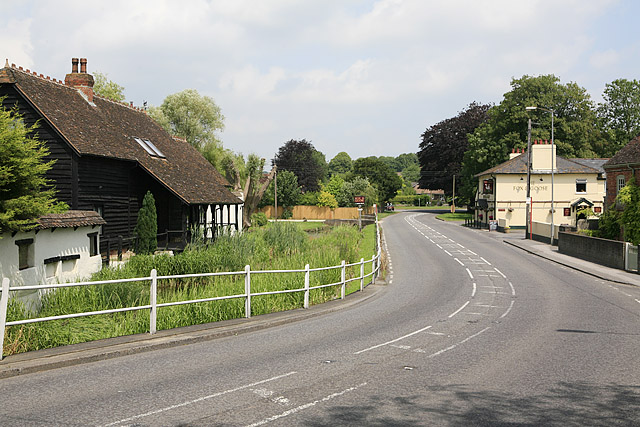
- A354, Coombe Bissett

- Location within Wiltshire
- Population: 675 (in 2011)
- OS grid reference: SU109264
- Civil parish: Coombe Bissett
- Unitary authority: Wiltshire
- Ceremonial county: Wiltshire
- Region: South West
- Country: England
- Sovereign state: United Kingdom
- Post town: Salisbury
- Postcode district: SP5
- Dialling code: 01722
- Police: Wiltshire
- Fire: Dorset and Wiltshire
- Ambulance: South Western
- UK Parliament: Salisbury
- Website: www.coombebissett.com

Coombe Bissett is a village and civil parish in the English county of Wiltshire in the River Ebble valley, 3 miles (4.8 km) southwest of Salisbury on the A354 road that goes south towards Blandford Forum. The parish includes the village of Homington, to the east towards the village of Odstock. In 2011 the parish had a population of 675.

== History ==
The has been human settlements in Coombe Bissett from as far back as the Neolithic Age and all the way through the Bronze Age, the Iron Age and the Roman period.

Records from Saxon times indicate that the Ebble valley was a thriving area, the River Ebble also being known as the River Chalke. The Domesday Book in 1086 divided the Chalke Valley into eight manors: Chelke (Chalke – Bowerchalke and Broadchalke), Eblesborne (Ebbesbourne Wake), Fifehide (Fifield Bavant), Cumbe (Coombe Bissett), Humitone (Homington), Odestoche (Odstock), Stradford (Stratford Tony and Bishopstone) and Trow (circa Alvediston). The Domesday Book also recorded Cumbe as a royal manor with 85 households, while Humitone had just two households. A medieval packhorse bridge, now a footbridge, crosses the Ebble close to the current road bridge at Coombe Bissett.

Coombe Bissett and Homington were separate parishes, each with its own church, until they were united in a joint benefice in 1885. Homington was absorbed into Coombe Bissett civil parish in 1934.

== Religious sites ==
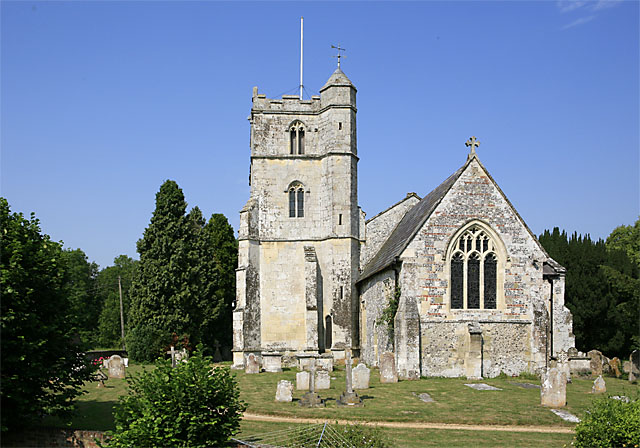
Church of St Michael and All Angels, Coombe Bissett

The two Anglican churches below are served by the Chalke Valley team ministry.

=== St Michael's, Coombe Bissett ===
The oldest part of St Michael's, the south aisle, is from the 12th century. The chancel was built in the 13th and the tower (with stair-turret) added in the 14th; the nave and north transept are 15th-century. Restoration in 1845 by T.H. Wyatt included the rebuilding of the west front, reducing the length of the building. The church is a Grade I listed building.

=== St Mary's, Homington ===
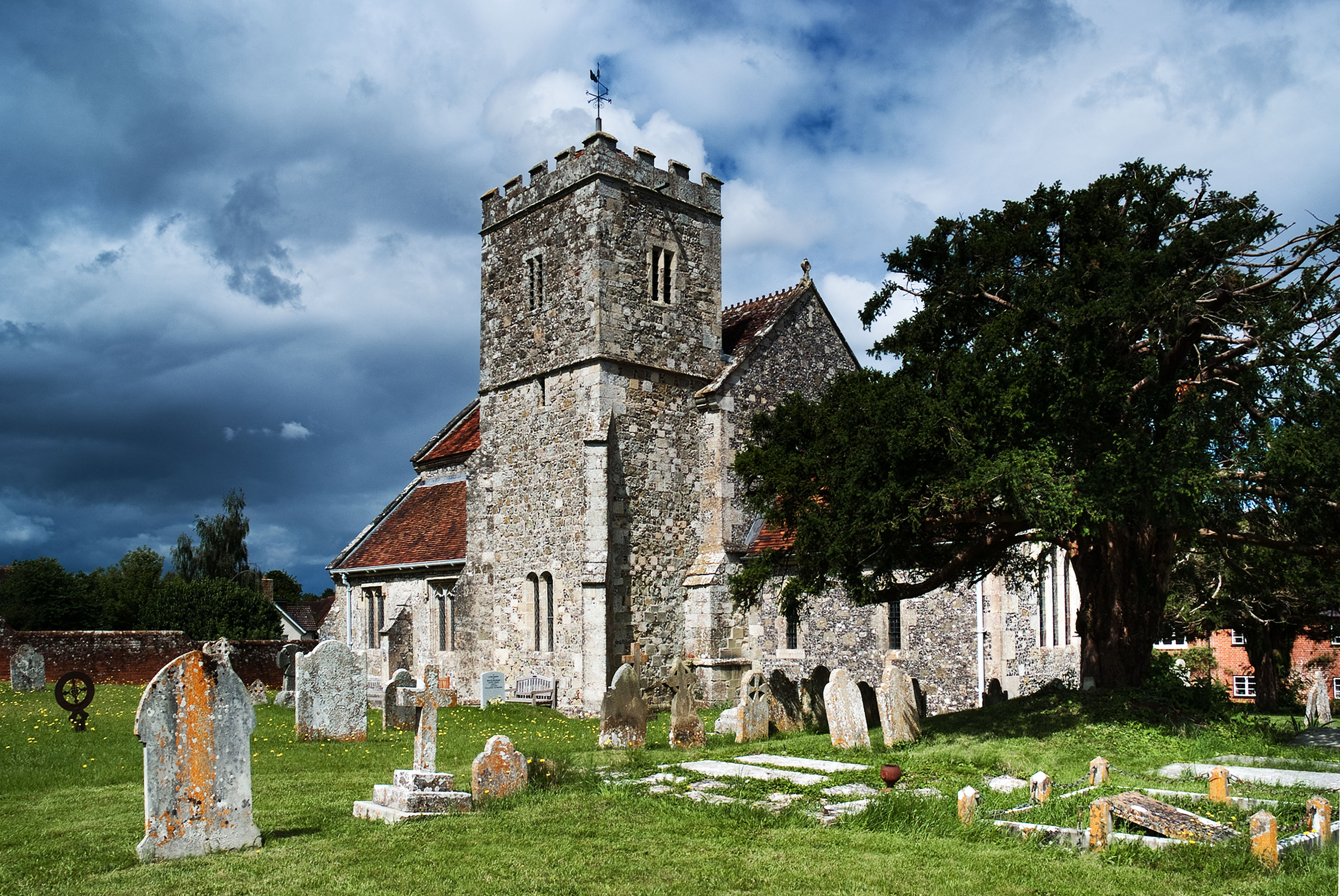
St Mary's Church, Homington

St Mary's is a 14th-century church, possibly with earlier origins. The tower of the present church is from the early 17th century and there was extensive restoration in the 1860s. The church is a Grade II* listed building.

=== Nonconformist chapels ===
A Primitive Methodist chapel was built in 1841 at the west end of Homington village, then rebuilt in 1877. The chapel closed in 1967 and is now a private house. In 1895 a Baptist chapel was opened at Coombe Bissett, on the road to Homington, and is used by the Coombe Fellowship.

== Amenities ==
Coombe Bissett has a pub, the Fox and Goose, a village hall, and a shop with a post office. A primary school was built at Shutts Lane in the 1960s, replacing a small National School on the Homington road which was built in 1845. Homington and Coombe Bissett Downs is a nature reserve on nearby chalk downland. There are various clubs within the village, including a tennis club, cricket club and badminton club. Salisbury and South Wiltshire Golf Course is to the north of the village. Salisbury Hospital is to the east, north of Odstock village and a 10-minute drive from Coombe Bissett.

== Notable people ==
- Tancred Borenius (1885–1948), Finnish art historian, died at Laverstock House hospital and is buried in Coombe Bissett churchyard.
- Tim Smith (1961–2020), songwriter, composer and former leader of Cardiacs, spent his later years near Coombe Bissett.
- Rick Parfitt (1948-2016), English musician, best known as a rhythm guitarist, singer and songwriter with rock band Status Quo, lived in Coombe Bissett from the mid 2000s until he relocated to Spain 2013-2014.
