= River Chalke =

River in Wiltshire, England

Coordinates: 51.02591°N 1.95708°W

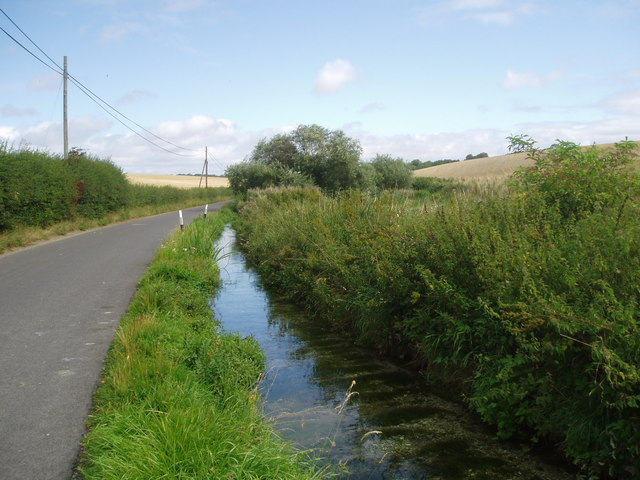
River Chalke and adjoining fish farm between Mead End, Bowerchalke and Broad Chalke

The River Chalke is a small river within the English county of Wiltshire. It is the most significant tributary of the River Ebble.

The river rises at Mead End near Bowerchalke and flows 1.2 miles north through the Chalke Valley to join the Ebble at Mount Sorrel, just upstream of Broad Chalke. It provides a steady, year-round flow of water; above the junction the Ebble is a winterbourne.

A typical chalk stream, the Chalke is noted for its brown trout and fish farms.
