= River Ebble =

River in Wiltshire, England

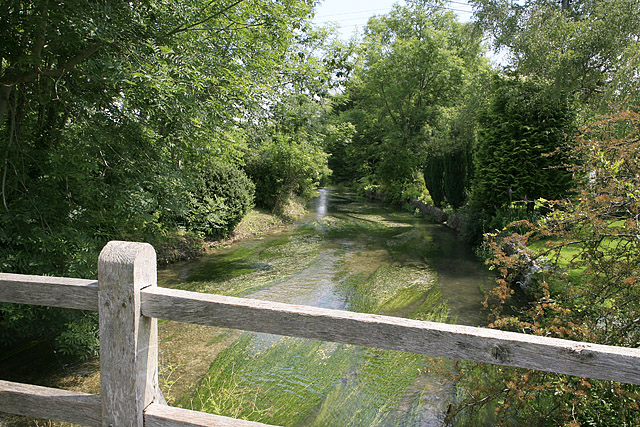
- River Ebble at Coombe Bisset

Location
- Country: England
- Region: West of England
- District: Wiltshire

Physical characteristics
- Source
  - location: Alvediston, Wiltshire, England
  - coordinates: 51.0127°N 2.039°W
- Mouth: River Avon (Hampshire)
  - coordinates: 51.0334°N 1.7582°W

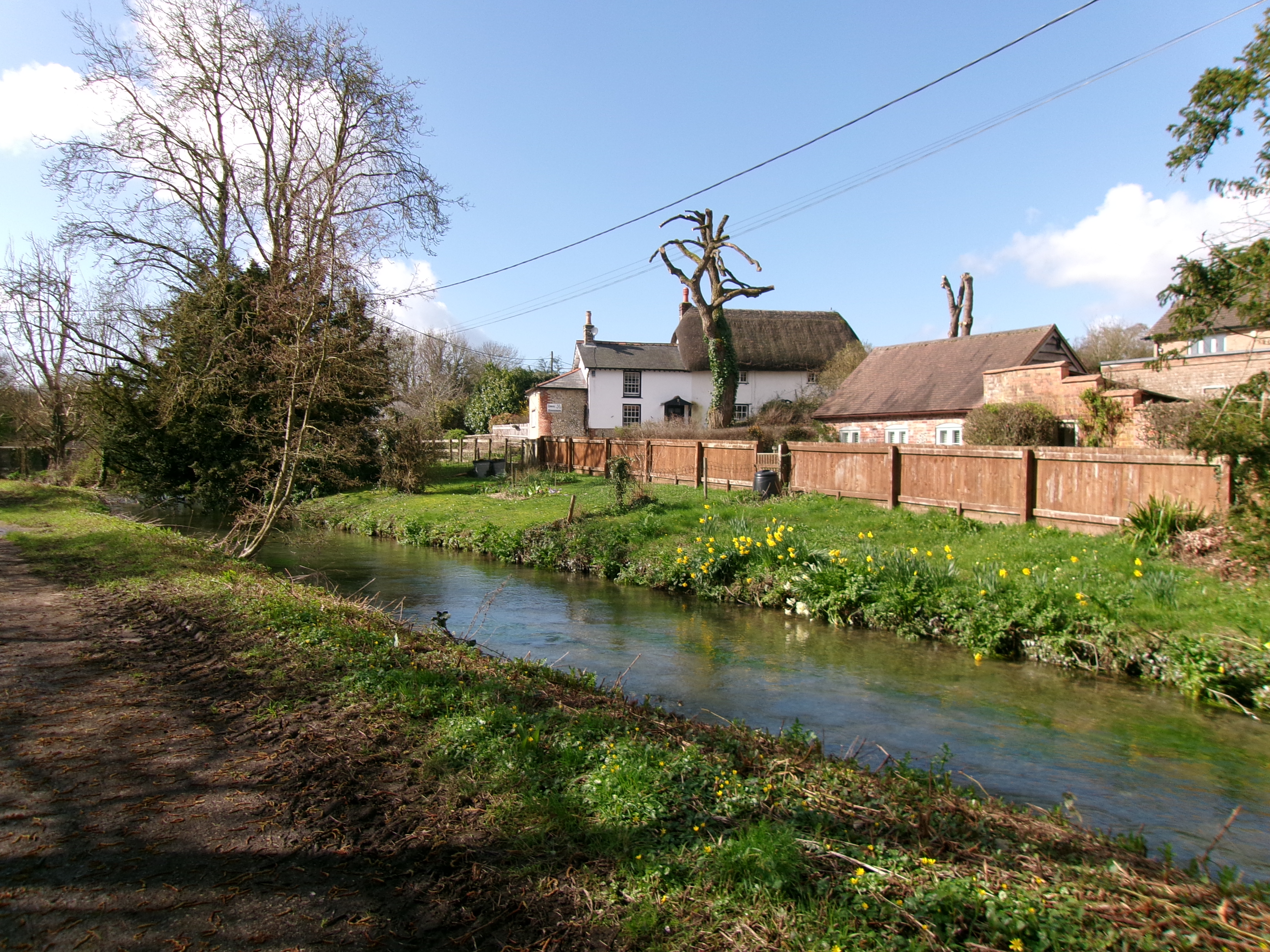
River Ebble at Bishopstone

The River Ebble is one of the five rivers of the English city of Salisbury. Rising at Alvediston to the west of the city, it joins the River Avon at Bodenham, near Nunton.

== Description ==
The Ebble rises at Alvediston, 12 miles (19 km) to the west of Salisbury, at 51.0127°N 2.039°W. It joins the River Avon 2 1/2 miles (4 km) southeast of the city at Bodenham (51.0334°N 1.7582°W) after flowing through Ebbesbourne Wake, Fifield Bavant, Little London, Knapp, Mount Sorrel, Broad Chalke, Stoke Farthing, Bishopstone, Stratford Tony, Coombe Bissett, Odstock and Nunton.

The River Chalke is the most significant tributary, rising in Bowerchalke and flowing through the Chalke Valley to join the Ebble at Mount Sorrel in Broad Chalke. The Chalke also provides a steady, year round flow, so that the winterbourne section of the Ebble is only from Alvediston to Knapp.

The flow of the Ebble is augmented at Little London by several pumped boreholes that feed the extensive commercial watercress farm at Knapp before the confluence with the Chalke.

== Origin of the name ==
In the book Ebbesbourne Wake Through The Ages historian Peter Meers surmised that the land and the bourne (river) was once owned by a man called Ebbel. He also identified that from Saxon times until 1166 there were two villages called Ebblesborne, one of which then became known as Bishopstone. Note that the word "bourne" is derived from the Old English "brunna".
