= Alvediston =

Village in Wiltshire, England

Coordinates: 51.012°N 2.036°W

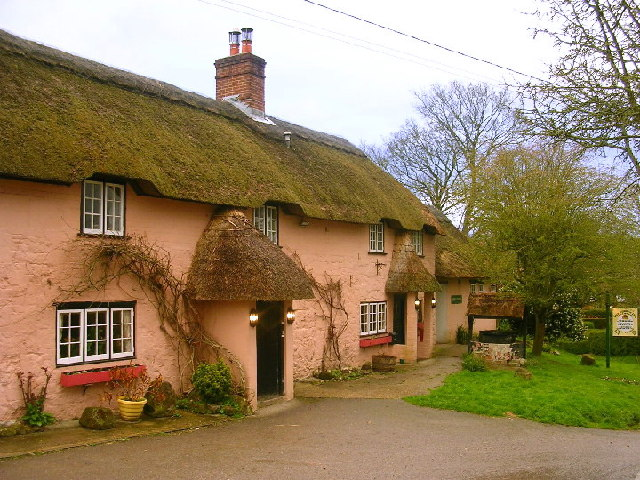
- The Crown, Alvediston

- Location within Wiltshire
- Population: 106 (in 2011)
- OS grid reference: ST976236
- Civil parish: Alvediston
- Unitary authority: Wiltshire
- Ceremonial county: Wiltshire
- Region: South West
- Country: England
- Sovereign state: United Kingdom
- Post town: Salisbury
- Postcode district: SP5
- Dialling code: 01722
- Police: Wiltshire
- Fire: Dorset and Wiltshire
- Ambulance: South Western
- UK Parliament: Salisbury

Alvediston is a small village and civil parish in Wiltshire, England, about 7 miles (11 km) east of Shaftesbury and 11 miles (18 km) southwest of Salisbury. The area is the source of the River Ebble and is within the Cranborne Chase and West Wiltshire Downs Area of Outstanding Natural Beauty. In 2011 the parish had a population of 106.

== History ==
Prehistoric sites in the parish include three Bronze Age bowl barrows on Trow Down and a field system from the same era at Elcombe Down.

Much of the land was granted to the nuns of Wilton Abbey in 955. Fragmentary records from Saxon times indicate that the Ebble valley was a thriving area. Domesday Book of 1086 recorded the division of the Chalke Valley into eight manors: Chelke (Chalke), Eblesborne (Ebbesbourne Wake), Fifehide (Fifield Bavant), Cumbe (Coombe Bissett), Humitone (Homington), Odestoche (Odstock), Stradford (Stratford Tony) and Trow. Alvediston emerged in 1156 as Alfweiteston, formed from the western part of Ebbesbourne Wake and the small manor of Trow. The name derives from the Old English Ælfgeatestūn, meaning "Ælfgeat's settlement". The manor passed to the Crown at the Dissolution, then in 1541 to Sir William Herbert who became Earl of Pembroke. Alvediston manor remained with the Pembrokes until 1918 when it was sold as two farms, Church Farm and Elcombe Farm.

The Ox Drove, a medieval drovers' road from Dorset to Salisbury, crossed the south of the parish.

In 1377, the parish had 111 poll-tax payers. The population of the parish reached 278 at the 1851 census but fell steadily from the 1870s, reaching a low of 84 in 1981.

Norrington manor was recorded as held from the king in 1210–1212. It was owned by the Gawen family from 1377 to 1658 and then by the Wyndham family until 1952.

== Governance ==
The civil parish is governed by a parish meeting, a form of governance applied to parishes with small populations. It is in the area of Wiltshire Council unitary authority, which is responsible for all significant local government functions. For Westminster elections, the parish is in the Salisbury constituency.

== Religious sites ==
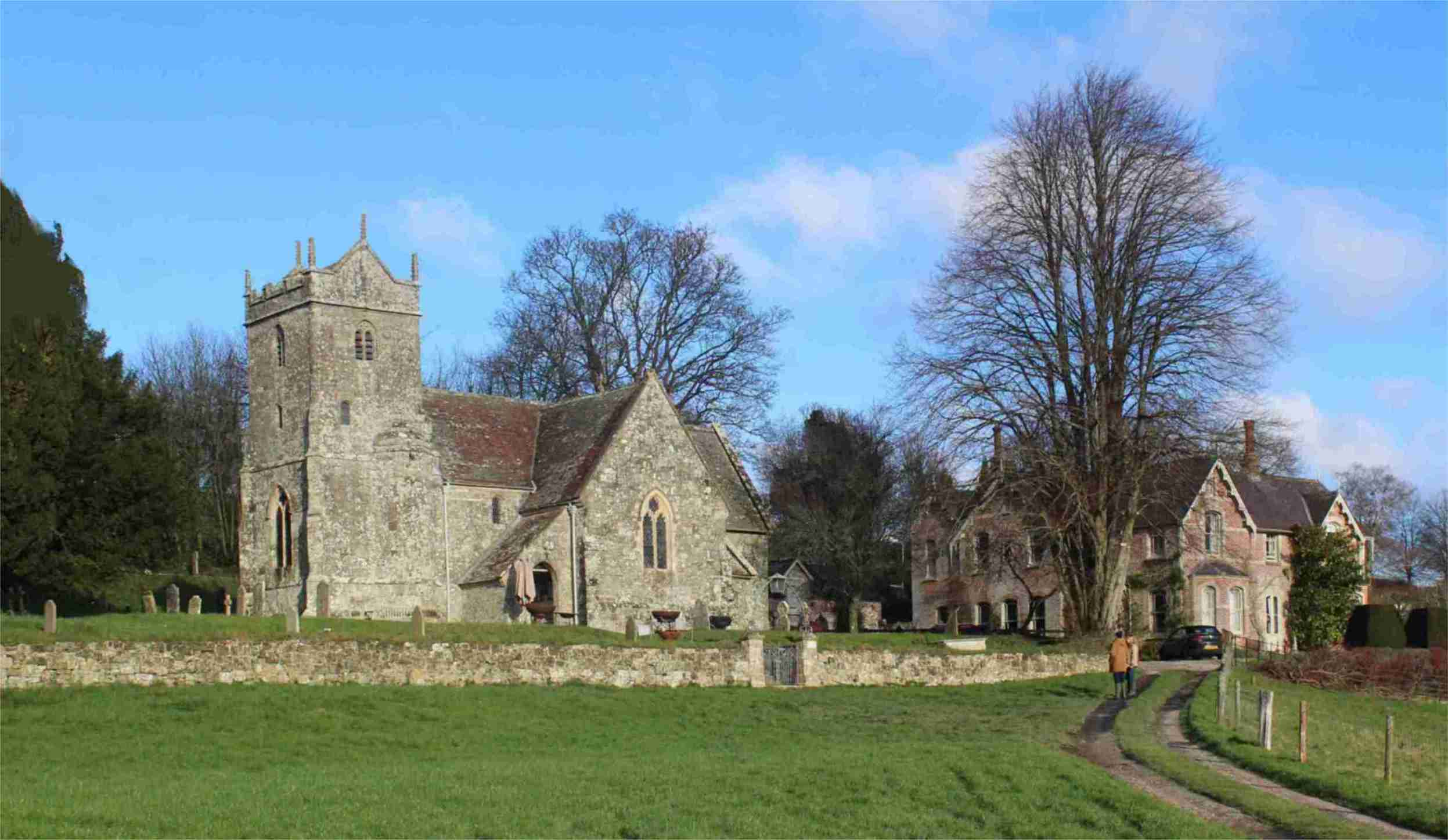
Alvediston St Mary's church

The Church of England parish church of St Mary stands on the north bank of the Ebble, next to Church Farm and with only the former vicarage and a 17th-century house nearby, the rest of the village now lying south of the river. Built in limestone, the church has a chancel with a north chapel, a nave with transepts and a west tower. The date of the nave is uncertain: the Wiltshire Victoria County History places it in the 12th century, with 14th-century transepts, but the English Heritage listing offers no date. The three-stage tower was built in the 17th century. Extensive restoration in 1866 by T.H. Wyatt included the addition of the north chapel and the rebuilding of the north transept. The church was designated as Grade II* listed in 1966.

The stone font bowl is 12th-century, while the pews and pulpit are from the 1860s. Monuments inside the church include a recumbent 14th-century knight, probably one of the Gawens of Norrington Manor. There are marble tablets to Sir Wadham Wyndham (d.1668), his wife (d.1704) and son John (d.1724). Two of the three bells are from the 17th century; at present the peal is unringable.

From 1584 or earlier, Broad Chalke, Bowerchalke and Alveston were held as one benefice, with Bowerchalke and Alvediston treated as chapels. This continued until Alvediston was made a perpetual curacy in 1861. In 1963 the benefice was united with that of Ebbesbourne Wake with Fifield Bavant, and in 1970 the parishes were united to form the parish of Ebbesbourne Wake with Fifield Bavant and Alvediston. Today the parish is part of the Chalke Valley Churches group.

A Primitive Methodist chapel was built in 1894 and closed sometime before 1951. As of 2019 the building was standing but unused.

== Notable buildings ==
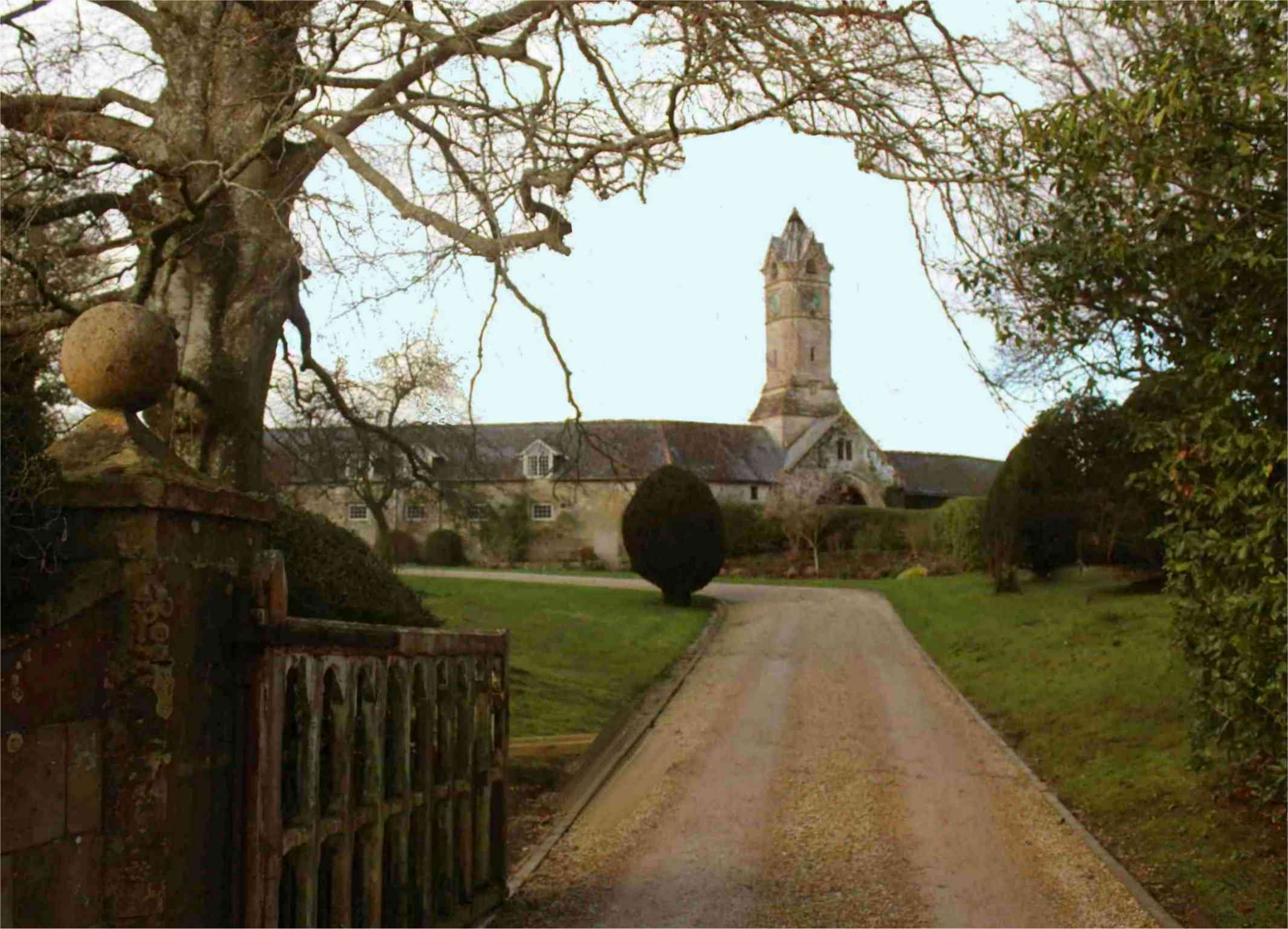
Samways Farm Stables and tower from The Street, Alvediston

The Crown Inn is on the south side of the village and was originally a pair of mid-17th century cottages.

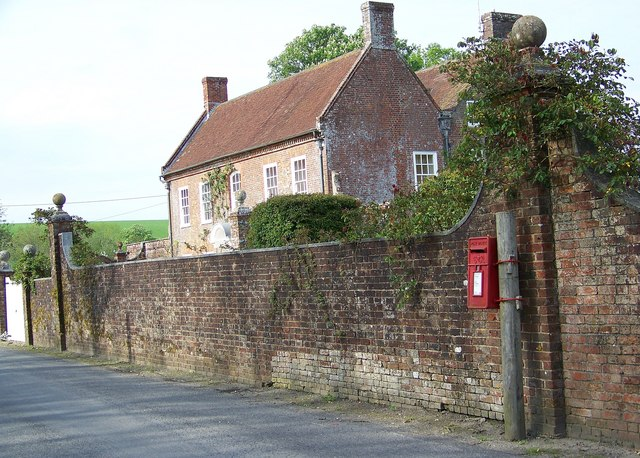
Alvediston Manor from the village street

Alvediston Manor (mid-18th century) is on the east side of the village street leading to the river, and is Grade II listed. From 1968 until his death in 1977, it was the home of the former prime minister Anthony Eden.

Samways House (c.1700) and Samways Farm Stables (mid 19th century) are north of the village street, about 200 metres west of the Crown Inn; both are also Grade II listed. The clocktower over the archway entrance to the stables was built by William Day in 1861 to celebrate his horse Dulcibella winning the Cesarewitch at Newmarket.

Norrington Manor, about 1 kilometre NNW of the village centre, is a Grade I listed manor house based on a 14th-century great hall. It was probably built by John Gawen, a layer, justice and Member of Parliament, who acquired the property in 1377. Around 1659 it was bought by Wadham Wyndham, a lawyer and later a Justice of the King's Bench.

== Amenities ==
Alvediston has a pub, the Crown Inn. A National School was built in 1872 but closed in 1922.

There are two Sites of Special Scientific Interest in the parish: Pincombe Down and Gallows Hill. The latter is notable for rare chalk grassland species and a scarce species of butterfly.

== Notable people ==
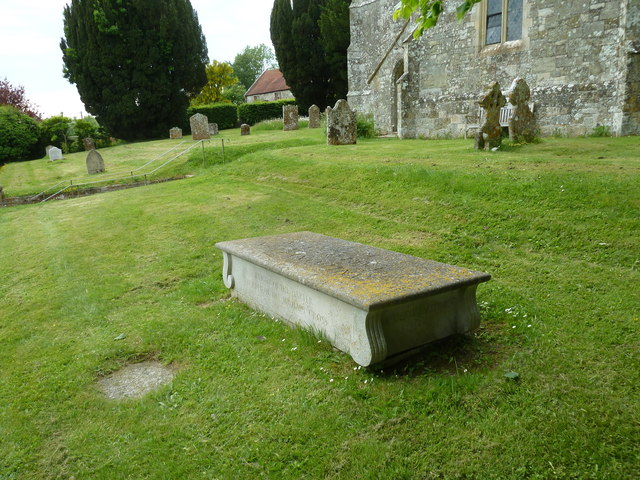
Eden's grave in the churchyard of St Mary's, Alvediston

Anthony Eden, 1st Earl of Avon, was a Conservative politician who was Foreign Secretary three times.

He was deputy to Winston Churchill for almost 15 years, and succeeded him as leader of the Conservative Party.

He won the 1955 general election and served as Prime Minister from 1955 to 1957.

Eden lived at Alvediston Manor from 1966 until his death in 1977. He was buried in St Mary's churchyard.

Clarissa Eden, Countess of Avon (1920–2021), Winston Churchill's niece and the second wife of Anthony Eden, continued to live at Alvediston Manor after her husband's death.

In 2018, Lady Avon became the oldest living spouse of a British prime minister. She turned 100 in 2020, the second British prime minister's spouse to become a centenarian after Mary Wilson.
