= Odstock =

Village in Wiltshire, England

Coordinates: 51.034°N 1.791°W

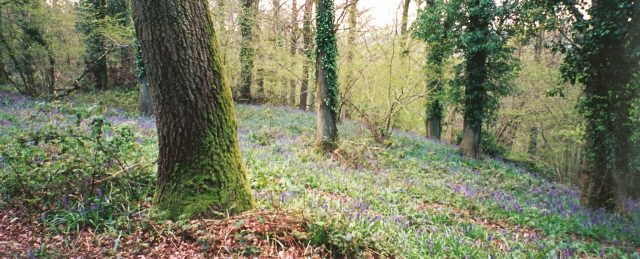
- Bluebells in Odstock woods

- Location within Wiltshire
- Population: 554 (in 2011)
- OS grid reference: SU148261
- Civil parish: Odstock
- Unitary authority: Wiltshire
- Ceremonial county: Wiltshire
- Region: South West
- Country: England
- Sovereign state: United Kingdom
- Post town: Salisbury
- Postcode district: SP5
- Dialling code: 01722
- Police: Wiltshire
- Fire: Dorset and Wiltshire
- Ambulance: South Western
- UK Parliament: Salisbury
- Website: Parish Council

Odstock is a village and civil parish 3 miles (4.8 km) south of Salisbury in Wiltshire, England. The parish includes the village of Nunton with its nearby hamlet of Bodenham. The parish is in the valley of the River Ebble, which joins the Hampshire Avon near Bodenham.

In the woods about Odstock are earthworks. The meaning of the name is probably "Odo's stockade".

Odstock Down is a biological Site of Special Scientific Interest.

== History ==
Fragmentary records from Saxon times indicate that the Ebble valley was a thriving area, the River Ebble also being known as the River Chalke. The Domesday Book in 1086 divided the Chalke Valley into eight manors, Chelke (Chalke), Eblesborne (Ebbesbourne Wake), Fifehide (Fifield Bavant), Cumbe (Coombe Bissett), Humitone (Homington), Odestoche (Odstock), Stradford (Stratford Tony) and Trow (circa Alvediston and Tollard Royal).

Oliver Cromwell is said to have stayed in Odstock in a 17th-century house that was once an inn called the Parsonage.

Nunton and Bodenham were transferred from Downton parish to Odstock in 1934.

== Buildings ==
The Grade II* listed Anglican church at Odstock is dedicated to St Mary. Originating in the 12th century, it was partially re-built by James Fowler of Louth in 1870. The previous year, Fowler added to the 1816 Odstock Rectory. Today the parish is part of the Chalke Valley Churches group.

At the church is the grave of Joshua Scamp who, to protect his daughter, took the blame for his son-in-law's theft of a horse, and was hanged. Legend has it that after Joshua's death a Gypsy curse was put on the Church.

Odstock Manor House dates from the 17th century and is also Grade II* listed. It is the home of Lord (Jonathan) Marland, businessman and Conservative politician.

What is now the Yew Tree Inn was a pair of 18th century cottages. George Ford is listed as a beer retailer and shopkeeper in Odstock in 1875 and is likely the first landlord of the inn.

== Hospital ==
Odstock Hospital was built in 1942 0.8 miles (1.3 km) north of the village, in the parish of Britford. From 1943 it was used by the United States 5th Army Medical Corps and provided support for the Normandy landings in 1944. With the creation of the National Health Service in 1948, the hospital was selected to house a new regional Plastic and Oral Surgery Centre providing burns and (since 1984) spinal care for patients in five counties. Since 1987 the site has developed into a large District Hospital.

== Longford Castle ==
North of Bodenham is the Longford Park estate and Longford Castle, seat of the Pleydell-Bouverie family, Earls of Radnor.
