= List of downs =

Down is used in the name of geographical features or locations that are downland or close to downland, including:

- Abbotts Ann Down, hamlet in Hampshire, England
- Afton Down, chalk down near the village of Freshwater on the Isle of Wight
- Andover Down, hamlet in Hampshire, England
- Arreton Down, biological Site of Special Scientific Interest on the Isle of Wight
- Ashley Down, area in the north of Bristol
- Aston Down, east of Minchinhampton, Gloucestershire, England
- Asylum Down, neighborhood in Accra, Ghana
- Ballard Down, area of chalk downland on the Purbeck Hills in Dorset, England
- Batcombe Down, biological Site of Special Scientific Interest in Dorset, England
- Bathampton Down, overlooking Bath, Somerset, England
- Beaminster Down, one of the highest hills in West Dorset, England
- Bembridge Down, Site of special scientific interest north-east of Sandown, Isle of Wight
- Bin Down, hill, 203 metres (666 ft) high near Liskeard in the county of Cornwall, England
- Black Down, Dorset, hill on the South Dorset Ridgeway in Dorset, England
- Black Down, Somerset, the highest hill in the Mendip Hills, Somerset, England
- Black Down, Sussex, the highest hill in the county of Sussex, England
- Black Hill Down, biological Site of Special Scientific Interest in Dorset, England
- Blow's Down, biological Site of Special Scientific Interest in Dunstable, Bedfordshire, England
- Bolberry Down, clifftop area on the coast of Devon, England
- MoD Boscombe Down, aircraft testing site in Amesbury, Wiltshire, England
- Botley Down, biological Site of Special Scientific Interest in Wiltshire, England
- Bourton Down, biological Site of Special Scientific Interest in Gloucestershire, England
- Brading Down, chalk down southwest of Brading, Isle of Wight
- Brean Down, promontory off the coast of Somerset, England
- Brickworth Down and Dean Hill, biological Site of Special Scientific Interest in Wiltshire, England
- Brighstone Down, chalk down on the Isle of Wight
- Broadhalfpenny Down, historic cricket ground in Hambledon, Hampshire
- Burcombe Down, area of chalk grassland south of Burcombe in Wiltshire, England
- Burham Down, woodland reserve in Kent
- Calbourne Down in Calbourne, a village and civil parish on the Isle of Wight
- Camp Down, biological Site of Special Scientific Interest in Wiltshire, England
- Camp Down, Portsdown Hill, Admiralty semaphore station, near Portsmouth, England
- Castle Down, windswept plateau of maritime heath in the island of Tresco, Isles of Scilly
- Catherington Down, Hampshire, England
- Chaldon Down, one of the highest hills on South Dorset's Jurassic Coast in England
- Charlton Down, village in Dorset, England
- Charnage Down Chalk Pit, geological Site of Special Scientific Interest in Wiltshire, England
- Chavey Down, hamlet in Berkshire, England
- Cherhill Down, village and civil parish in Wiltshire, England
- Chilbolton Down, hamlet in the civil parish of Chilbolton, Hampshire, England
- Claverton Down, suburb on the south-east hilltop edge of Bath, Somerset, England
- Clearbury Down, biological Site of Special Scientific Interest in Wiltshire, England
- Clifton Down, public open space in Bristol, England, north of the village of Clifton
- Cockey Down, biological Site of Special Scientific Interest in Wiltshire, England
- Combe Down, village suburb of Bath, Somerset, England
- Combe Down and Bathampton Down Mines, Site of Special Scientific Interest in Bath, Somerset, England
- Compton Down, hill on the Isle of Wight just to the east of Freshwater Bay
- Copehill Down, UK Ministry of Defence training facility on Salisbury Plain, Wiltshire, England
- County Down, county in Northern Ireland
- Crawley Down, village in the Mid Sussex district of West Sussex, England
- Culver Down, chalk down to the north of Sandown, Isle of Wight
- Danks Down and Truckle Hill, biological Site of Special Scientific Interest in Wiltshire, England
- Dorset Down, breed of sheep native to the Dorset Downs region of England
- Downe, a village in Greater London, England; formerly known as Down
- Duncan Down, open, public, area to the south west of Whitstable, England
- Dundry Down, village south of Bristol, England
- Durdham Down, area of public open space in Bristol, England
- East Down, Devon, village and civil parish in the Barnstaple district of Devon, England
- Ebsbury Down, biological Site of Special Scientific Interest in Wiltshire, England
- Emery Down, small village in the New Forest National Park in Hampshire, England
- Epsom Down, used as a cricket venue between 1816 and 1819, near Epsom, England
- Farthing Down, open space in Coulsdon in the London Borough of Croydon, England
- Finkley Down, suburb and hamlet in the civil parish of Finkley in Hampshire, England
- Five Ash Down, small village within the civil parish of Maresfield, East Sussex, England
- Fyfield Down, part of the Marlborough Downs, north of the village of Fyfield, Wiltshire, England
- Galley Down Wood, biological Site of Special Scientific Interest in Hampshire, England
- Garston's Down, Site of special scientific interest which is south of Carisbrooke, Isle of Wight
- Gurston Down Motorsport Hillclimb, in Broad Chalke, Wiltshire, England
- Hadlow Down, village and civil parish in the Wealden District of East Sussex, England
- Head Down, Hampshire, one of the highest points in the county of Hampshire, England
- Headley Down, village within the civil parish of Headley, Hampshire, England
- Henwood Down, one of the highest points in the county of Hampshire, England
- High Down (Isle of Wight), area of downland on Isle of Wight, England
- Hingston Down, hill not far from Gunnislake in Cornwall, England, United Kingdom
- Holybourne Down, high point near Alton, Hampshire, England
- Houghton Down, hamlet in the Test Valley district of Hampshire, England
- Itchin Stoke Down, rural location near the town of Alresford in Hampshire, England
- Kentisbury Down, location of an Iron Age enclosurenear Blackmore Gate, Exmoor, Devon, England
- Kimpton Down, village and civil parish in the Test Valley district of Hampshire, England
- Lady Down Quarry, geological Site of Special Scientific Interest in Wiltshire, England
- Lardon Chase, the Holies and Lough Down, adjacent National Trust properties in Berkshire, England
- Maes Down, geological Site of Special Scientific Interest between Shepton Mallet and Stoney Stratton in Somerset, England
- Melbury Down, area of downland in northern Dorset, England
- Milber Down, Iron Age hill fort on the hill above the suburb of Milber, Newton Abbot, Devon, England
- Mockham Down, the site of an Iron Age Hill Fort close to Brayfordhill in Devon, England
- Mottistone Down, Site of Special Scientific Interest north of Mottistone, Isle of Wight
- Nine Barrow Down, elongated hill, the northern ridge of the Purbeck Hills in Dorset, England
- Normanton Down Barrows, Neolithic and Bronze Age barrow cemetery south of Stonehenge in Wiltshire, England
- Northington Down, hamlet in the civil parish of Northington, Hampshire, England
- Odd Down, area of the city of Bath, Somerset, England
- Odstock Down, biological Site of Special Scientific Interest in Wiltshire, England
- Old Castle Down, Site of Special Scientific Interest in the Vale of Glamorgan, South Wales
- Old Down, hamlet near Olveston and Tockington in South Gloucestershire, England
- Otterham Down, village and a civil parish in north Cornwall, England
- Overton Down, a long-term project in experimental archaeology in Wiltshire, England
- Park Gate Down, stretch of chalk downland near Elham in East Kent, England
- Parsonage Down, biological Site of Special Scientific Interest in Wiltshire, England
- Payne's Down, prominent hill near Axminster, Dorset, England
- Perham Down, village in Wiltshire, England, near Ludgershall and Tidworth
- Perriam Down near Ludgershall, Wiltshire, England was used as a cricket venue between 1787 and 1796
- Pincombe Down, biological Site of Special Scientific Interest in Wiltshire, England
- Pitcombe Down, biological Site of Special Scientific Interest in Dorset, England
- Porth Hellick Down, area of downland on the island of St Mary's in the Isles of Scilly
- Porton Down, United Kingdom government military science park
- Prescombe Down, biological Site of Special Scientific Interest in Wiltshire, England
- Rampisham Down, chalk hill in the Dorset Downs, near Dorchester, Dorset, England
- Rew Down, Site of Special Scientific Interest and Local Nature Reserve, Isle of Wight
- Roundway Down and Covert, biological Site of Special Scientific Interest in Wiltshire, England
- Seaton Down, the location of an Iron Age hill fort near Seaton, Devon, England
- Shovel Down, area of Dartmoor in Devon, England that is covered in megaliths
- Southern Down or Southerndown, village in South Wales to the southwest of Bridgend
- St. Catherine's Down, chalk down on the Isle of Wight, near the southernmost point on the island
- St Boniface Down, chalk down on the Isle of Wight, England
- Starveall and Stony Down, Site of Special Scientific Interest in Codford and Wylye, Wiltshire, England
- Steeple Langford Down, biological Site of Special Scientific Interest at Steeple Langford in Wiltshire, England
- Stenbury Down, chalk down on the Isle of Wight
- Stockton Wood and Down, biological Site of Special Scientific Interest in Wiltshire, England
- Stonehill Down Nature Reserve, downland nature reserve on the Purbeck Hills, Dorset, England
- Stoney Down, hill and forested countryside in Dorset, England
- Stormy Down, Site of Special Scientific Interest near Pyle in Bridgend County Borough, south Wales
- Stratford Toney Down, biological Site of Special Scientific Interest in Wiltshire, England
- Tennyson Down, hill at the west end of the Isle of Wight just south of Totland
- Throope Down, biological Site of Special Scientific Interest in Wiltshire, England
- Thruxton Down, west of Andover, Hampshire, England
- Toller Down, one of the highest hills in the county of Dorset, England
- Trendlebere Down, woodland managed by Natural England in Dartmoor, Devon, England
- Twyford Down, area of chalk downland southeast of Winchester, Hampshire, England
- Tytherington Down, biological Site of Special Scientific Interest in Wiltshire, England
- Upton Cow Down, biological Site of Special Scientific Interest in Wiltshire, England
- War Down, one of the highest hills in the county of Hampshire, England
- Waterpit Down in Forrabury and Minster, a civil parish in Cornwall, England
- Watership Down, Hampshire, hill in Ecchinswell, Sydmonton and Bishops Green in Hampshire, England
- Wavering Down, geological and biological Site of Special Scientific Interest in the Mendip Hills, Somerset, England
- West Down, civil parish and village located in North Devon, England, between Braunton and Ilfracombe
- Headon Warren and West High Down SSSI, Site of special scientific interest, Isle of Wight
- West Yatton Down, biological Site of Special Scientific Interest in Wiltshire, England
- Westover Down, chalk down on the Isle of Wight
- Wether Down, one of the highest hills in the county of Hampshire, England
- Whiddon Down, hamlet within the parish of Drewsteignton in Devon
- Whitehill Down, Site of Special Scientific Interest in Carmarthen & Dinefwr, Wales
- Willingdon Down, Site of Special Scientific Interest in Eastbourne, East Sussex, England
- Win Green Down, biological Site of Special Scientific Interest in Wiltshire, England
- Windmill Down, rural location near the town of Hambledon in Hampshire, England
- Wingletang Down (St Agnes), Site of Special Scientific Interest on the island of St Agnes in the Isles of Scilly, England
- Winterbourne Down, Gloucestershire, village in South Gloucestershire, England
- Worthy Down Camp, British Army barracks near Winchester, Hampshire, England
- Yellowmead Down, location of Yellowmead stone circle near Sheepstor in Devon, England

== Battles on downs ==
- Battle of Hingston Down in 838 at Hingston Down, Cornwall between Cornish and Vikings against West Saxons
- Battle of Roundway Down in 1643 during the First English Civil War
- Battle of Sourton Down in 1643 during the First English Civil War
- Battle of Stalling Down in 1403 between the supporters of the Welsh leader Owain Glyndŵr and those of King Henry IV of England

== See also ==
- Downland
- Down (disambiguation)
- Down (surname)
- Downs (disambiguation)
