= Stratford Tony =

Village in Wiltshire, England

Coordinates: 51.037°N 1.869°W

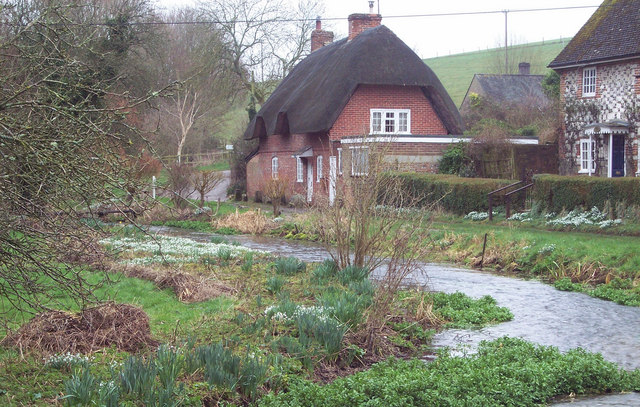
- River Ebble at Stratford Tony

- Location within Wiltshire
- Population: 55 (in 2011)
- OS grid reference: SU093264
- Civil parish: Stratford Toney
- Unitary authority: Wiltshire
- Ceremonial county: Wiltshire
- Region: South West
- Country: England
- Sovereign state: United Kingdom
- Post town: Salisbury
- Postcode district: SP5
- Dialling code: 01722
- Police: Wiltshire
- Fire: Dorset and Wiltshire
- Ambulance: South Western
- UK Parliament: Salisbury

Stratford Tony, also spelt Stratford Toney, formerly known as Stratford St Anthony and Toney Stratford, is a village and civil parish in southern Wiltshire, England. It lies on the River Ebble and is about 4 miles (6.4 km) southwest of Salisbury. In 2011 the parish had a population of 55.

== Geography ==
The parish is narrow in the east–west direction. To the south it extends onto high chalk downland, which is crossed by the A354 Salisbury-Weymouth road. In the north the parish boundary is the Shaftesbury Drove; now a byway, this was formerly used to drive cattle and other livestock from Shaftesbury to markets at Salisbury and beyond. Salisbury Racecourse is just over the boundary, and some of its facilities are in the parish.

Stratford Toney Down, south of the village, is a Site of Special Scientific Interest for its botanically rich chalk grassland.

== History ==
After the Norman Conquest, the Chalke Valley was divided into eight manors which were granted to new Norman lords. The Domesday survey in 1086 recorded an estate at Stradford with 28 households and two mills, held by Earl Aubrey of Coucy.

The National Gazetteer (1868) said of the parish:

STRATFORD TONY (or Stratford St. Anthony), a parish in the hundred of Cowden, county Wilts, 4 miles S. W. of Salisbury, its post town. The village is situated on a branch of the river Avon, and about a mile W. of the road from Salisbury to Dorchester, near the line of the ancient Icknield Street. It formerly belonged to the Wests. The living is a rectory in the diocese of Sarum, value £393, in the patronage of Corpus Christi College, Oxford. The church is old, and dedicated to St. Mary. There is a parochial school. John Bampton, founder of the Bampton Lectures, was once rector of this parish.

The area of the parish was reduced in 1885 when land was transferred to Britford, Coombe Bissett, and Homington parishes.

Stratford Tony House, west of the church, has a 17th-century core behind a five-bay front of c.1730. Nearby is a timber-framed barn from the late 18th century. Towards the north end of the village, the manor house carries a date of 1833; it was built for George Purefoy-Jervoise (1770–1847), landowner and member of parliament.

The population of the parish peaked at around 165 in the 1860s and has declined since then.

== Parish church ==
The Church of England parish church of St Mary and St Lawrence is designated a Grade I listed building and is in the care of the Churches Conservation Trust. There is a canonical sundial on the south wall. Its parish registers survive in the Wiltshire and Swindon History Centre for christenings, 1605–1985, marriages, 1562–1983, and burials, 1562–1988.

== Local government ==
The civil parish does not elect a parish council. Instead the first tier of local government is a parish meeting, which all electors are entitled to attend. The parish is in the area of Wiltshire Council, a unitary authority which is responsible for most significant local government functions.

== Notable residents ==
John Bampton (1690–1751) was rector from 1718 until his death. He left money to establish the Bampton Lectures at Oxford University, which continue to be given every second year.

The Impressionist painter Wilfrid de Glehn (1870–1951) and his wife Jane Emmet (1873–1961, also a painter) lived at Stratford Tony manor house from 1942.
