= Tennyson Trail =

Long-distance footpath on the Isle of Wight, England

The Tennyson Trail
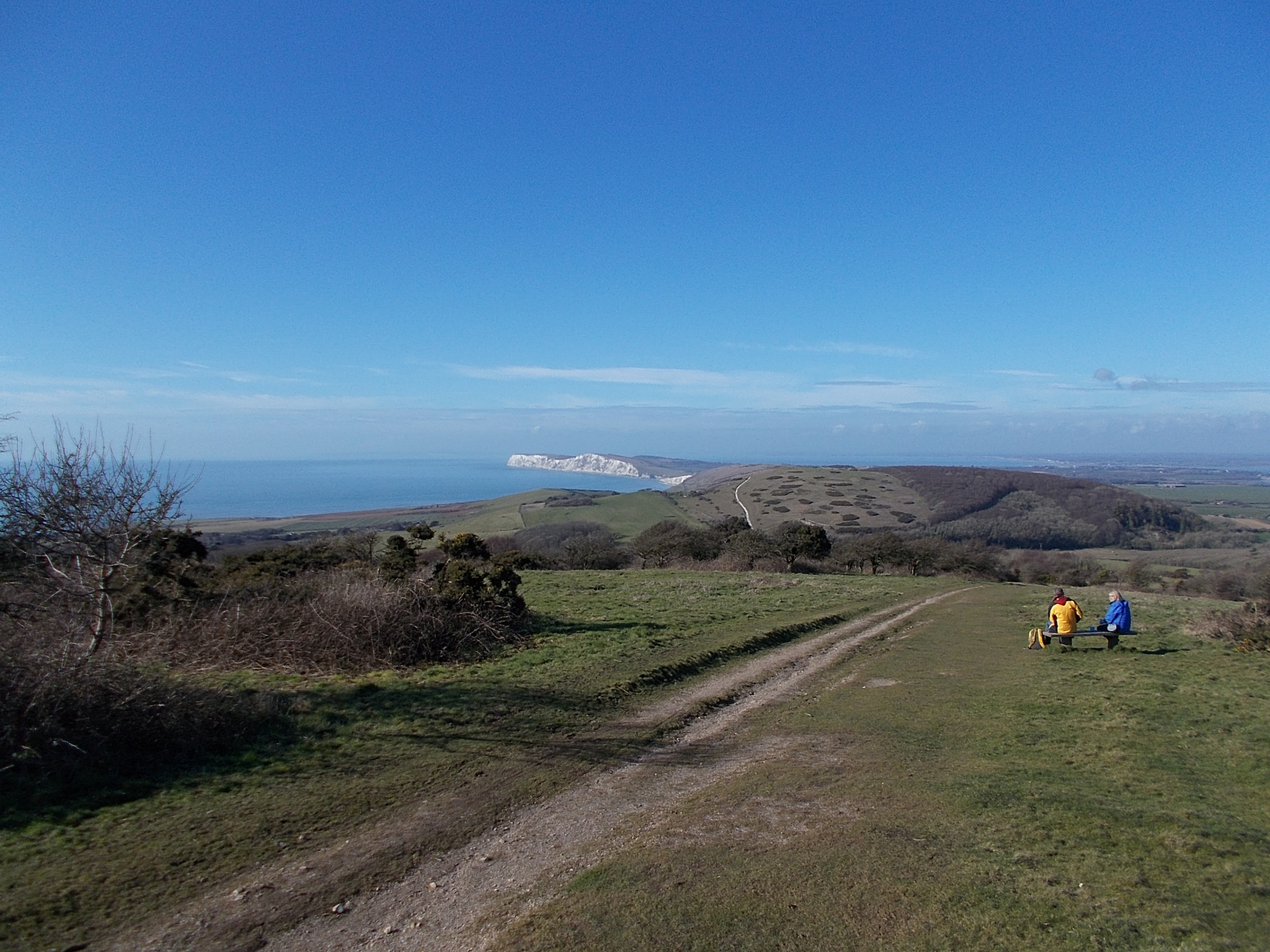
- Fine views west along the trail from the top of Mottistone Down. Tennyson Down can be seen in the distance (white chalk cliffs).
- Length: 14 mi (23 km)
- Location: Isle of Wight
- Trailheads: Carisbrooke; 50.6907°N 1.3193°W; The Needles; 50.6666°N 1.5658°W
- Use: Hiking
- Difficulty: Moderate
- Season: All year
- Sights: The Needles Battery

The Tennyson Trail is a 14-mile walk from Carisbrooke to The Needles on the Isle of Wight. The route goes through Bowcombe Down, Brighstone Forest, Mottistone Down, Brook Down, Afton Down, Freshwater Bay, Tennyson Down, and West High Down to Alum Bay. The name of the trail comes from poet Alfred Lord Tennyson, a former resident of the Isle of Wight.

There are several points of interest along the walk, including The Tennyson Monument on Tennyson Down, Farringford House and The Needles Batteries which overlook The Needles.

Much of the trail, being a public byway, was formerly open to all traffic, including motor vehicles. By the early 2000s, off-road vehicles had become an increasing problem, and were damaging tracks, archaeological sites and wildlife habitats. In response, in 2006, the Isle of Wight council banned all motor vehicles from the entire length of the trail.

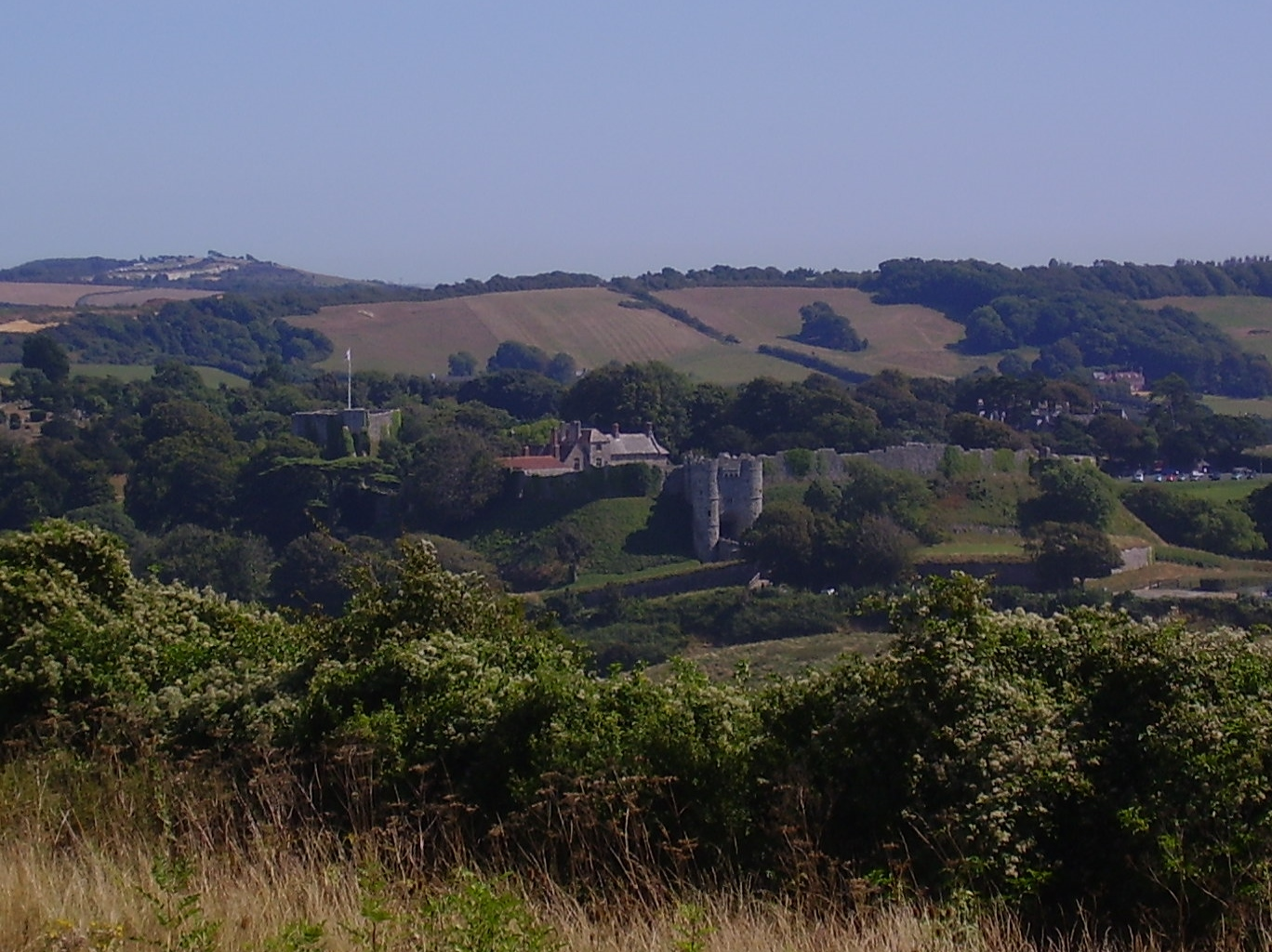
View of Carisbrooke Castle from the trail; looking east

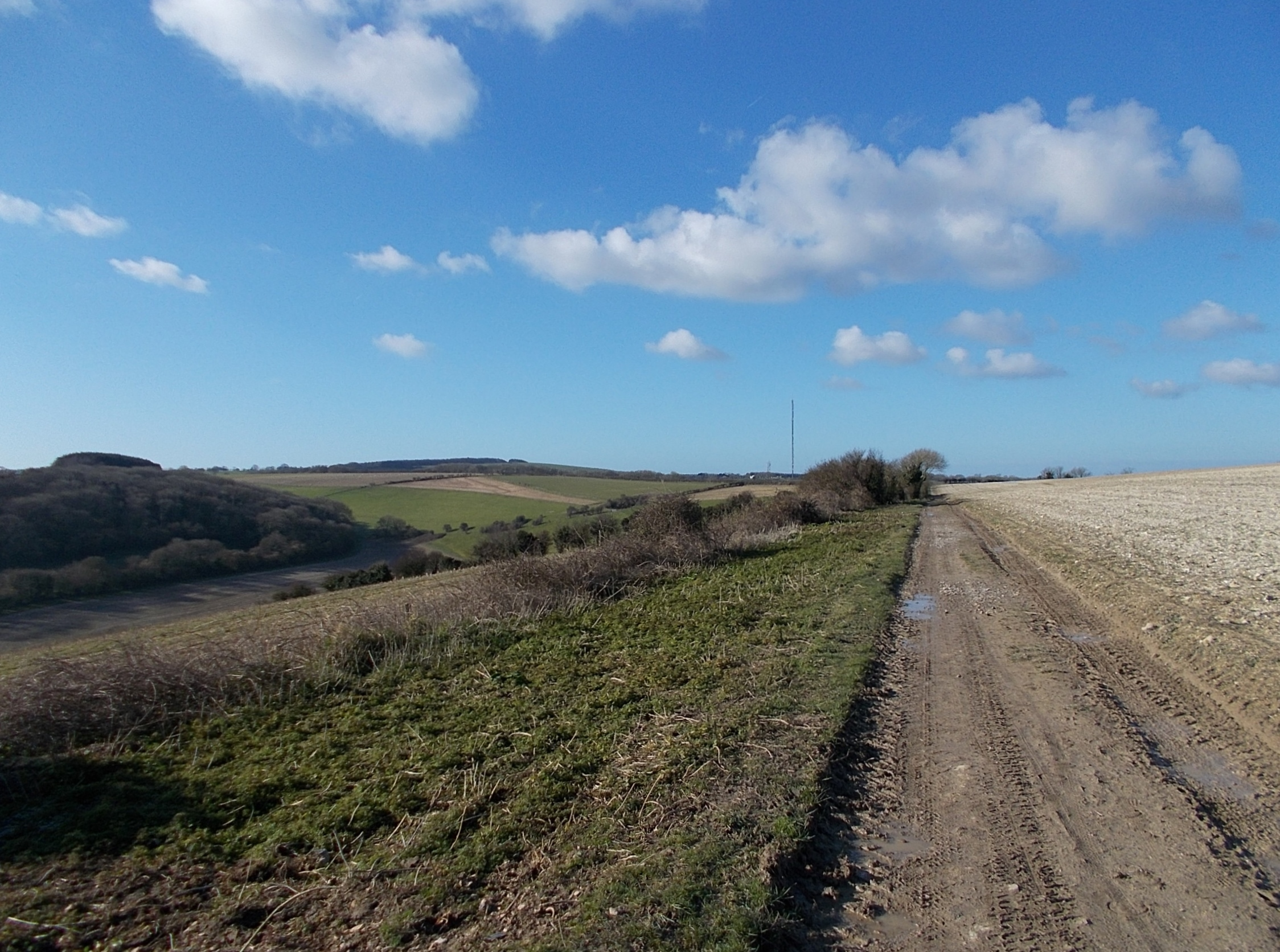
Looking west along the trail above Bowcombe, with Rowridge Transmitter in the distance.

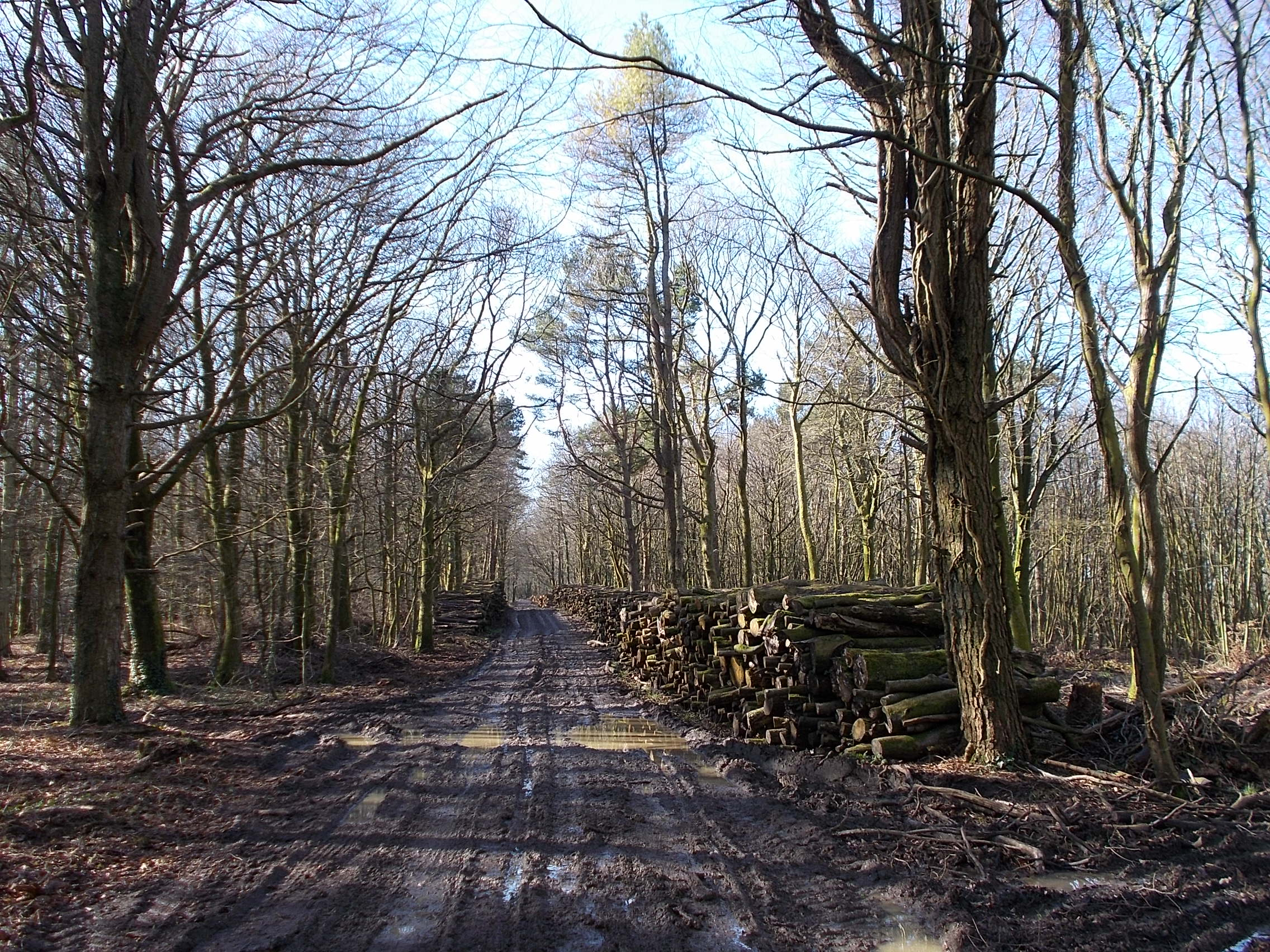
The trail through Brighstone Forest. Looking south west.

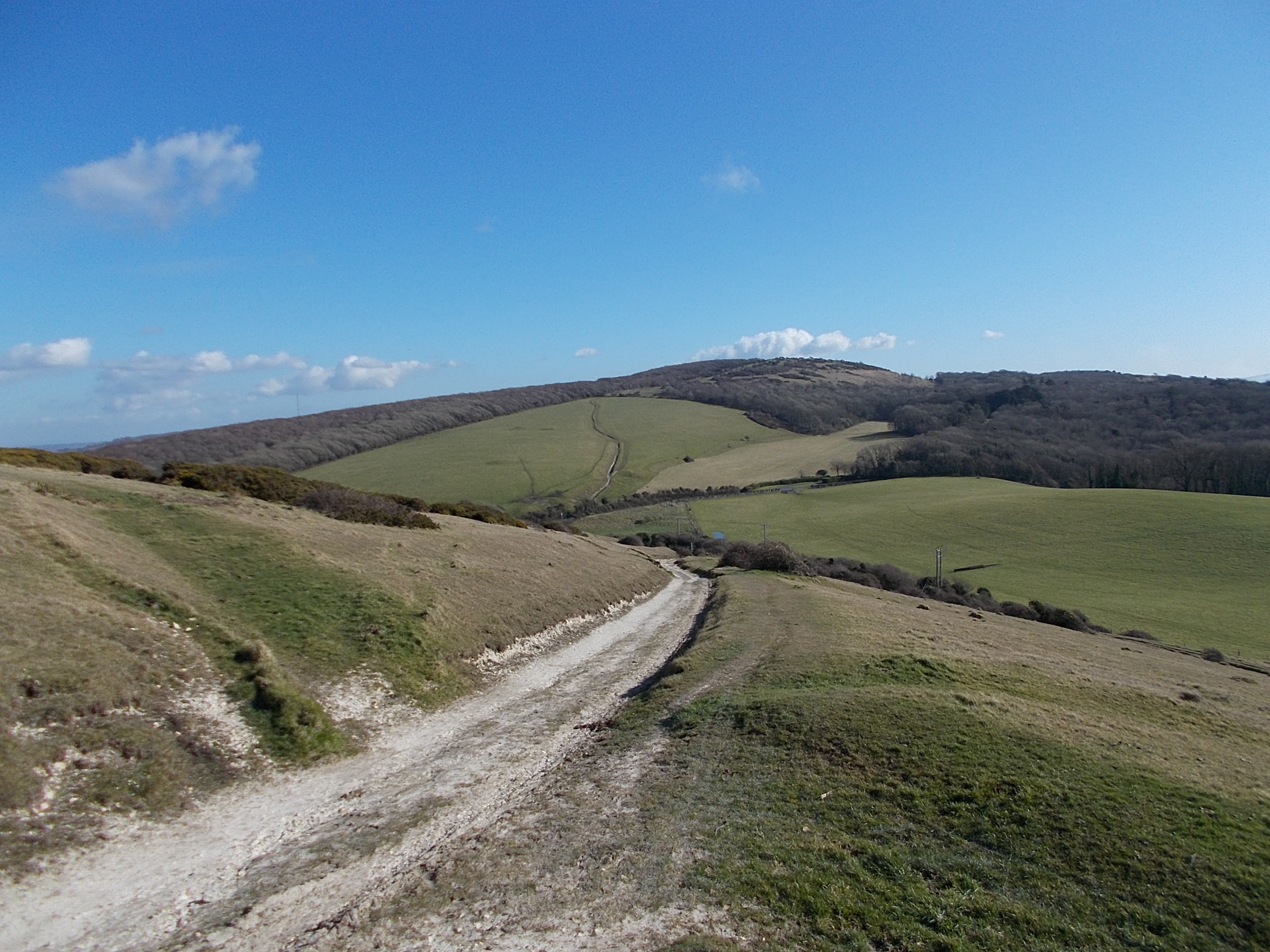
View east from Brook Down towards Mottistone Down.

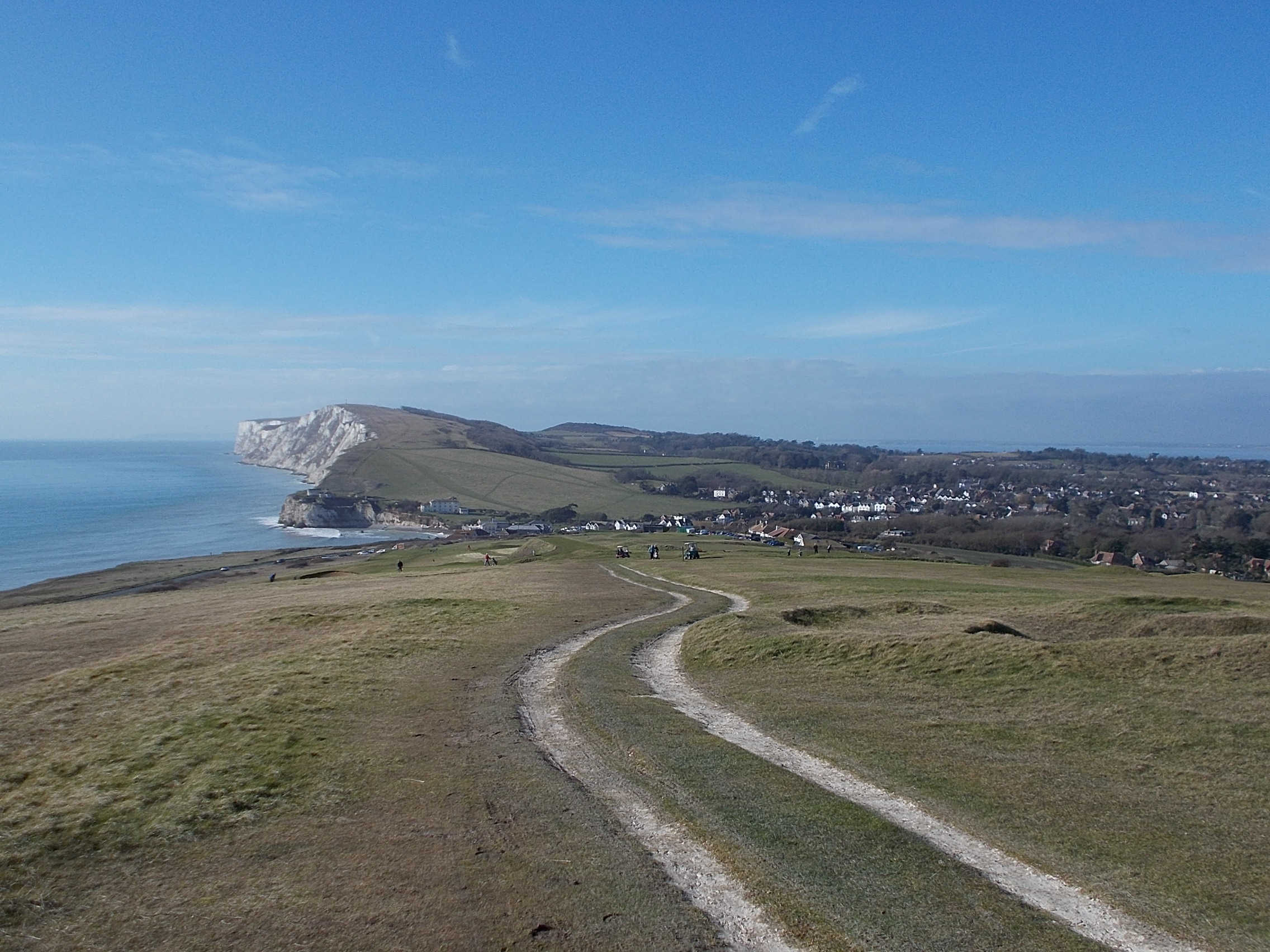
Descending towards Freshwater Bay.

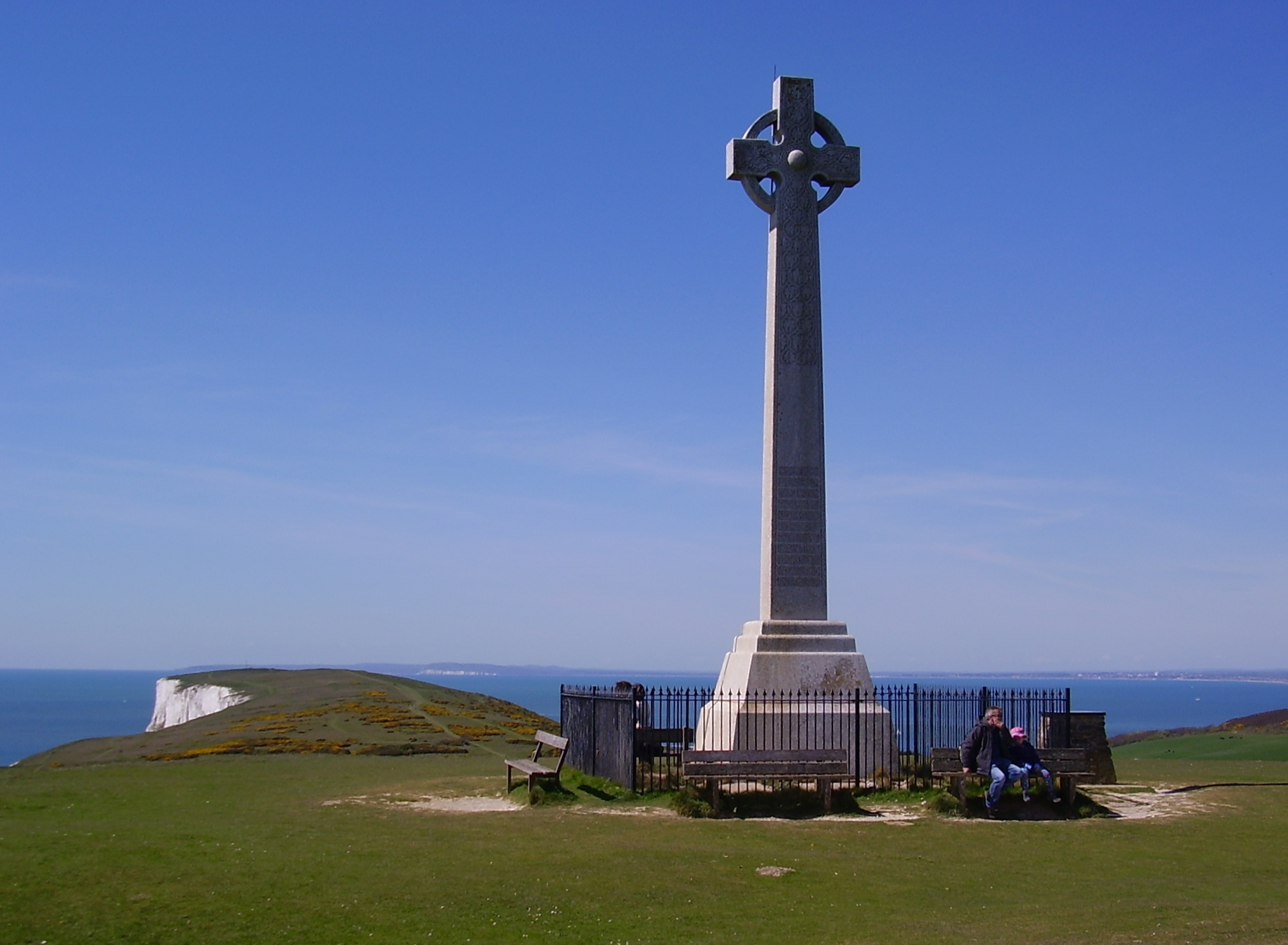
Monument to Tennyson at the top of Tennyson Down.

The route can be joined at any point, or walked in either direction; however, below it is described from Carisbrooke to Alum Bay.

== Carisbrooke to Brighstone ==
The route starts from Carisbrooke near Newport. The sign for the Tennyson Trail is present on Nodgham Lane. After this, the trail follows a steep hill in a south-westerly direction along an ancient road with banks on each side. Views to the left show Carisbrooke Castle, leading on to Bowcombe Valley. The route later crosses bridleways N125 and N127 and later passes N140 where a television mast is visible. At this point the path starts to descend before crossing a gate to a crossing track at the bottom. After crossing this, the route travels along Bridleway N136a to Brighstone Forest to another gate around 80 metres further ahead. An overhead electrical cable will later pass overhead and will follow a narrow beech plantation to the left. After passing Bridleway N198 the trail continues straight ahead and uphill through open fields before levelling off at a gate which levels off and follows the sign for Bridleway N139 to Brook and Freshwater. As the track continues, it slowly becomes enclosed in trees through Brighstone Forest.

== Brighstone to Brook ==
On reaching Brighstone Forest, signs for the Tennyson Trail appear. After following these signs the track starts to descend and crosses Bridleway BS58 shortly before reaching a five-way crossing. After continuing straight at the crossing, a signpost appears showing the Worsley Trail and Shorwell to the left and the Tennyson Trail to the right. Following this leads to Brighstone Down. The trail continues west along this track with sea views to the left before descending steadily to exit at a picnic area onto Lynch Lane. Turning right, then left will lead through the National Trust Jubilee Car Park and onto the National Trust information board. After passing the Forestry Commission Brighstone Forest entrance, the trail follows the down following the ancient road to the summit. After leaving National Trust land through a gate and continuing ahead on level ground, the path will immediately pass ancient burial mounds on the right. The track then descends to a further gate into a field where the Tennyson Trail is signposted. It will then descend through the field to reach the B3399 road to Freshwater and Yarmouth to the right and Brook to the left.

== Brook to Freshwater ==
After turning right onto the road towards Freshwater, the path immediately restarts to the left by a bus stop and car park onto Compton Down. This track begins to immediately climb steeply passing a chalk pit on the right then bears right to avoid overhead electric cables. The trail continues ahead, steadily gaining height towards Afton Down. It then travels through the golf course on Afton Down with the track later descending to Freshwater Bay.

== Freshwater to Alum Bay ==
From here, the Tennyson Trail joins the westbound Coastal path next to a block of public toilets on the lane to Fort Redoubt. This lane then turns sharply left passing through two sets of stiles onto Tennyson Down. From here the trail continues along the coastline, continuing to rise to the Tennyson Monument. After reaching the monument, the ground starts to descend. At the bottom of Tennyson Down will be a stile leading on to West High Down which has a steady incline until a radio aerial comes into view. After crossing a stile by the aerial, the trail then continues right onto a tarmac road. From here to the left, The Needles Battery can be seen. The road passes a row of cottages where it turns sharply left. Here there is a stile with a descending path and another stile back onto the road. This road continues downwards to Alum Bay, marking the end of the trail.
