= J. Arthur Dixon =

British manufacturer of greetings cards and postcards

John Arthur Dixon (18 June 1897 - 19 May 1958) was the British founder of the eponymous manufacturer of greetings cards and postcards, J. Arthur Dixon.

Dixon was born at Cross Hills, Keighley, Yorkshire, the eldest son of Charles C. Dixon.

In 1926, he moved to Shanklin on the Isle of Wight, where he bought a small printing business. Dixon was a keen photographer, and in 1937 he produced his first Christmas cards. Initially, he was producing postcards under contract for W. J. Nigh & Sons Ltd, Ventnor, Isle of Wight. From 1937 (evidenced by a postmark on a colour tinted photo card of Shanklin Old Village) he was producing postcards on his own account.

In 1951, production began at an 87,000 sq ft factory was built at Newport, Isle of Wight, leased from the Ministry of Aviation. The factory was a former aircraft hangar at Parkhurst Forest.

In 1951, more than 14 million greetings cards were produced and in 1955, nearly 30 million postcards. In 1958, the company began producing guidebooks.

Dixon died on 19 May 1958 at the Royal Isle of Wight County Hospital, Ryde.
