= Melbury Down =

Landform in Dorset, England

Coordinates: 50.9727°N 2.1462°W

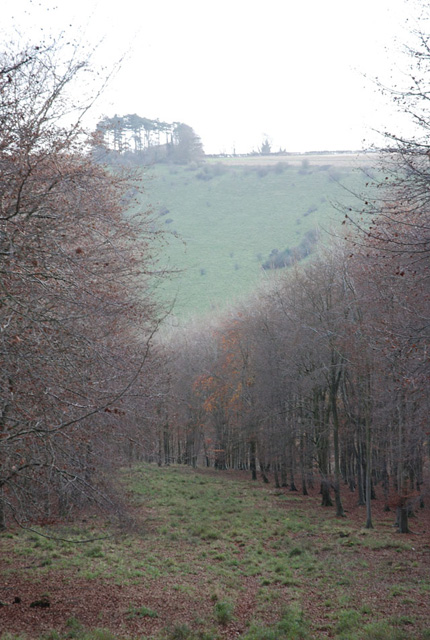
Melbury Down from Melbury_Wood

Melbury Down is an area of downland in northern Dorset, England.

It is owned by the National Trust.

The chalk grassland here supports large butterfly populations, including very large numbers of Chalkhill Blue, and a colony of Silver-spotted Skipper.
