= Brighstone Forest =

Coordinates: 50.666°N 1.390°W

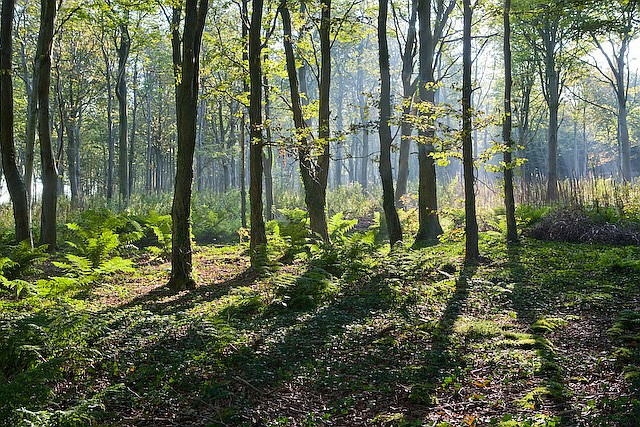

Brighstone Forest is located in the southwest of the Isle of Wight. It is the largest forest on the Isle of Wight, being just a few hectares larger than Parkhurst Forest. It is spread over a number of hilly ridges which form the backbone of the Isle of Wight. From west to east the ridges are Chessell Down, Westover Down, Brighstone Down, Newbarn Down, Rowborough Down and Idlecombe Down. The main entrance is located at grid reference SZ 419849. The forest lies close to the small town of Brighstone, and is part of the Isle of Wight AONB.

Shalcombe Down is an outlying block of woodland to the west of Brighstone Forest. The entrance to this block is located at grid reference SZ 395852.

Both woods are managed by the Forestry Commission under leasehold agreements - the total area is 482 hectares.
