= John Bampton =

English churchman (1690–1751)

John Bampton (1690 – 2 June 1751) was an English churchman who founded the Bampton Lectures at the University of Oxford.

== Biography ==
Bampton's father was Jasper Bampton of Salisbury. In 1705 at age 16 he was admitted to Trinity College, Oxford, where he graduated B.A. in 1709, M.A. in 1712. He was rector of Stratford Tony, Wiltshire, and simultaneously a prebendary of Salisbury, from April 1718 until his death in 1751.

== Will establishing lectures ==
He is now remembered chiefly because of the contents of his will, which directs that eight lectures shall be delivered annually at Oxford in the University Church on as many Sunday mornings in full term, "between the commencement of the last month in Lent term and the end of the third week in Act term, upon either of the following subjects: to confirm and establish the Christian faith, and to confute all heretics and schismatics; upon the divine authority of the Holy Scriptures; upon the authority of the writings of the primitive fathers, as to the faith and practice of the primitive Church; upon the divinity of our Lord and Saviour Jesus Christ; upon the divinity of the Holy Ghost; upon the articles of the Christian faith as comprehended in the Apostles and Nicene Creeds."

The bequest did not take effect until 1779, when the first lecturer was chosen.

The lecturer, who must be at least a Master of Arts of Oxford or Cambridge, was formerly chosen yearly by the heads of colleges, on the fourth Tuesday in Easter term, and no one can be chosen a second time. The Bampton Lectures, as they are known, began in 1780, and are still held, but have been biennial since 1901. The lectures have to be published within two months of their delivery.

== Background to the benefaction ==
Oxford University and Earl of Radnor's Estates Act 1805
- Act of Parliament
- Parliament of the United Kingdom
- Long title: An Act for effectuating an Exchange between the Chancellor, Masters and Scholars of the University of Oxford and the Right Honourable Jacob Earl of Radnor.
- Citation: 45 Geo. 3. c. lxxxii

Dates
- Royal assent: 27 June 1805

Text of statute as originally enacted

Bampton owned Nunton Farm, in southern Wiltshire near his parish, comprising land in Nunton, Downton, and Britford. Jacob Bouverie, 1st Viscount Folkestone wished to purchase it for his estate at Longford Castle which is just north-east of Nunton. Bampton was unwilling to sell, a dispute arose, and to put the land beyond Folkestone's reach, Bampton left it to the University of Oxford, which took possession around 1778 after his wife had died. Eventually Jacob Pleydell-Bouverie, 2nd Earl of Radnor, Folkestone's grandson, made an exchange in 1805 with the university of Nunton Farm for the Tinkersole estate at Wing, Buckinghamshire, backed by a local act of Parliament, the Oxford University and Earl of Radnor's Estates Act 1805 (45 Geo. 3. c. lxxxii).

== Sarum lectures ==
A second series of lectures, not restricted to Anglican theologians, was established with the Bampton fund in 1952. The first Sarum lecturer was appointed for 1954; the lectureship was discontinued in 1995. The subsequent annual series of Sarum Theological Lectures are unconnected, being organised by Sarum College and taking place in Salisbury Cathedral.

Sarum Lecturers at Oxford

- 1954 C. H. Dodd, Historical Tradition in the Fourth Gospel
- 1958 Fernando Capelle
- 1960 A. N. Sherwin-White, Roman Society and Roman Law in the New Testament
- 1964 David Knowles, From Pachomius to Ignatius: A Study in the Constitutional History of the Religious Orders
- 1966 Basil Edward Butler, The Theology of Vatican II
- 1968 Alec Vidler, A Variety of Catholic Modernists
- 1971 H. H. Price, Essays in the Philosophy of Religion
- 1972 Edward Yarnold, Second Gift: Study of Grace
- 1976 John S. Donne, The Reasons of the Heart
- 1980 Schubert Ogden, The Point of Christology
- 1982 Henry Chadwick on St Augustine of Hippo
- 1986 Gordon D. Kaufman
- 1990 Raymond Plant, published in Politics, Theology and History
- 1992 Basil Mitchell, Faith and Criticism
- 1995–6 David Martin, published as Does Christianity Cause War?
