= Parkhurst Forest =

Forest on the Isle of Wight

Coordinates: 50.72121°N 1.33131°W

- Site of Special Scientific Interest
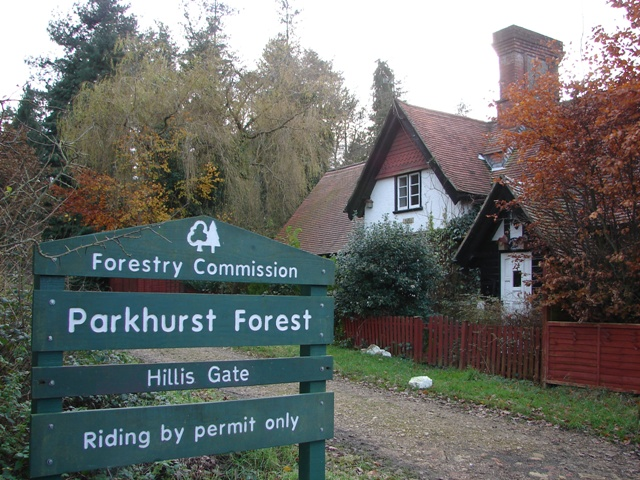
- Hillis Gate - Parkhurst Forest
- Location of Parkhurst Forest.
- Area of search: Isle of Wight
- Grid reference: SZ473915
- Interest: Biological
- Area: 395 hectares (1.53 sq mi)
- Notification date: 1986
- Location map: Natural England

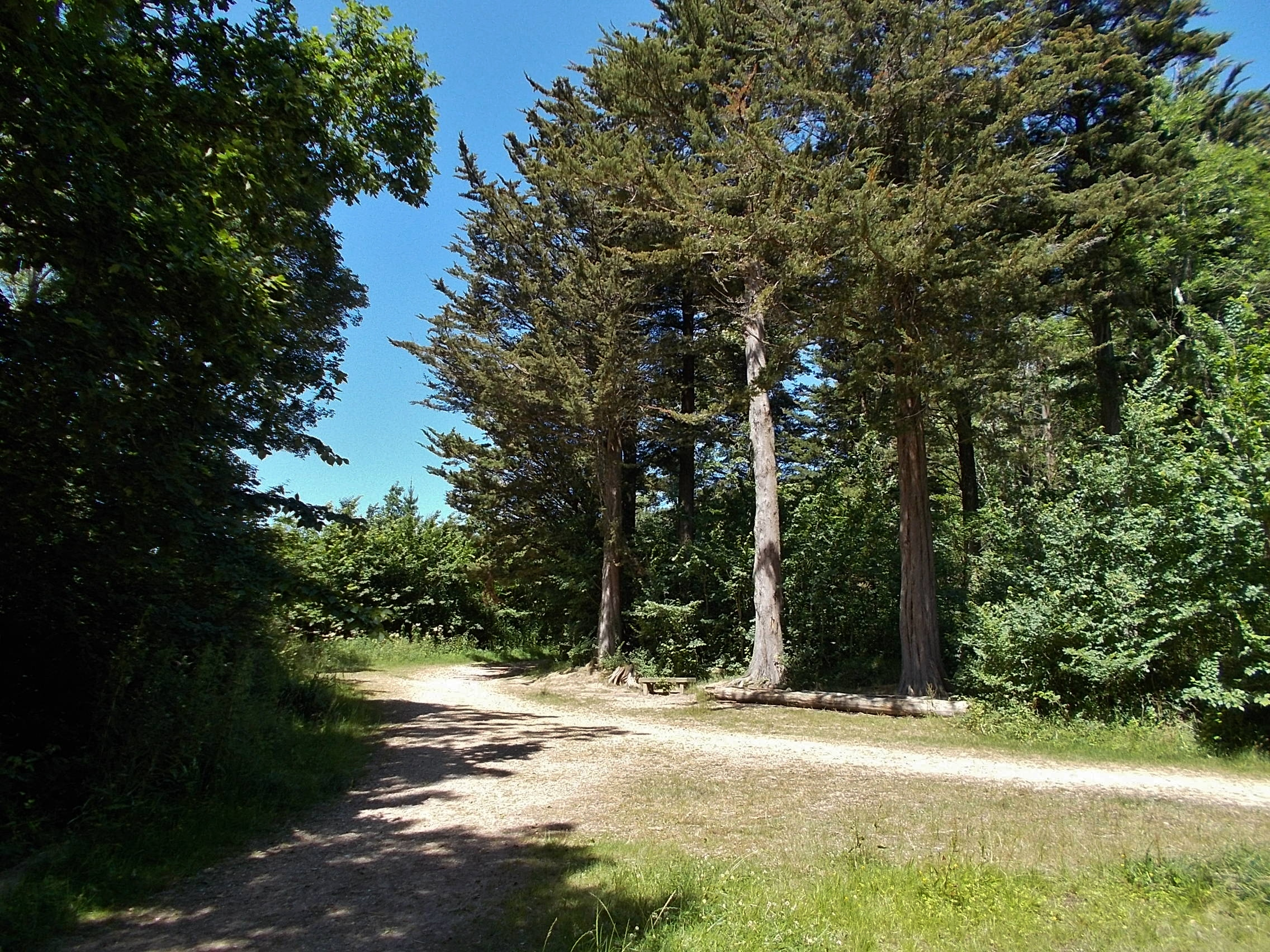
Scenery in the forest

Parkhurst Forest is a woodland to the north-west of Newport, Isle of Wight, England.

The site is partly a site of special scientific interest. It consists of ancient woodland, relict heathland and plantation woodland. The woodland is freehold owned and managed by Forestry England. It is 395 hectares (1.53 sq mi) in area and the second largest forest on the Isle of Wight after Brighstone Forest. It is open to the public.

It is much used as recreational land and is a haven for wildlife including the red squirrel and many species of bird such as garden warbler, nightjar, woodcock, green, great spotted woodpecker and long eared owl.

An industrial area is located off Forest Road within the forest itself. Factories were located in this way during the Second World War to avoid German bombers. One of these factories, a former aircraft hangar, became the printworks for J. Arthur Dixon, the eponymous manufacturer of greetings cards and postcards.

James I hunted deer in the forest. There have been sightings of wild deer reported on the Isle of Wight.
