= Stratford Toney Down =

Protected area in Wiltshire, England

Coordinates: 51.0207°N 1.8659°W

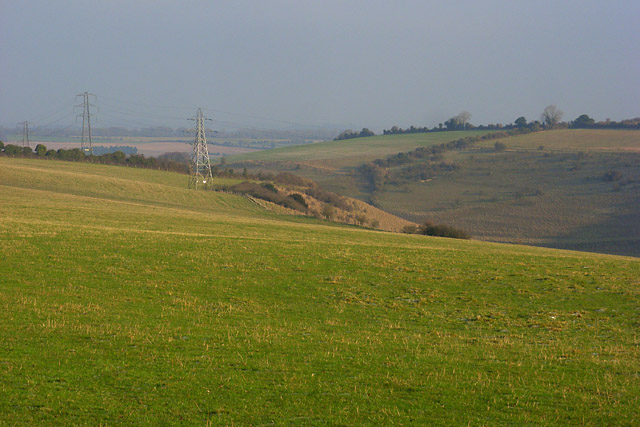
Downland, Stratford Tony

Stratford Toney Down (grid reference SU095246) is a 23.1 hectare biological Site of Special Scientific Interest in Wiltshire, England, which was notified in 1987. The site lies in a shallow dry valley in the south of Stratford Tony parish, about 5 miles (7.5 km) south-west of Salisbury. It is important for the botanically rich chalk grassland – mainly sheep's fescue and meadow oat grass – which supports several nationally rare plant and butterfly species.
