= Tennyson Down =

Hill on the Isle of Wight, UK

Coordinates: 50.66647°N 1.54150°W

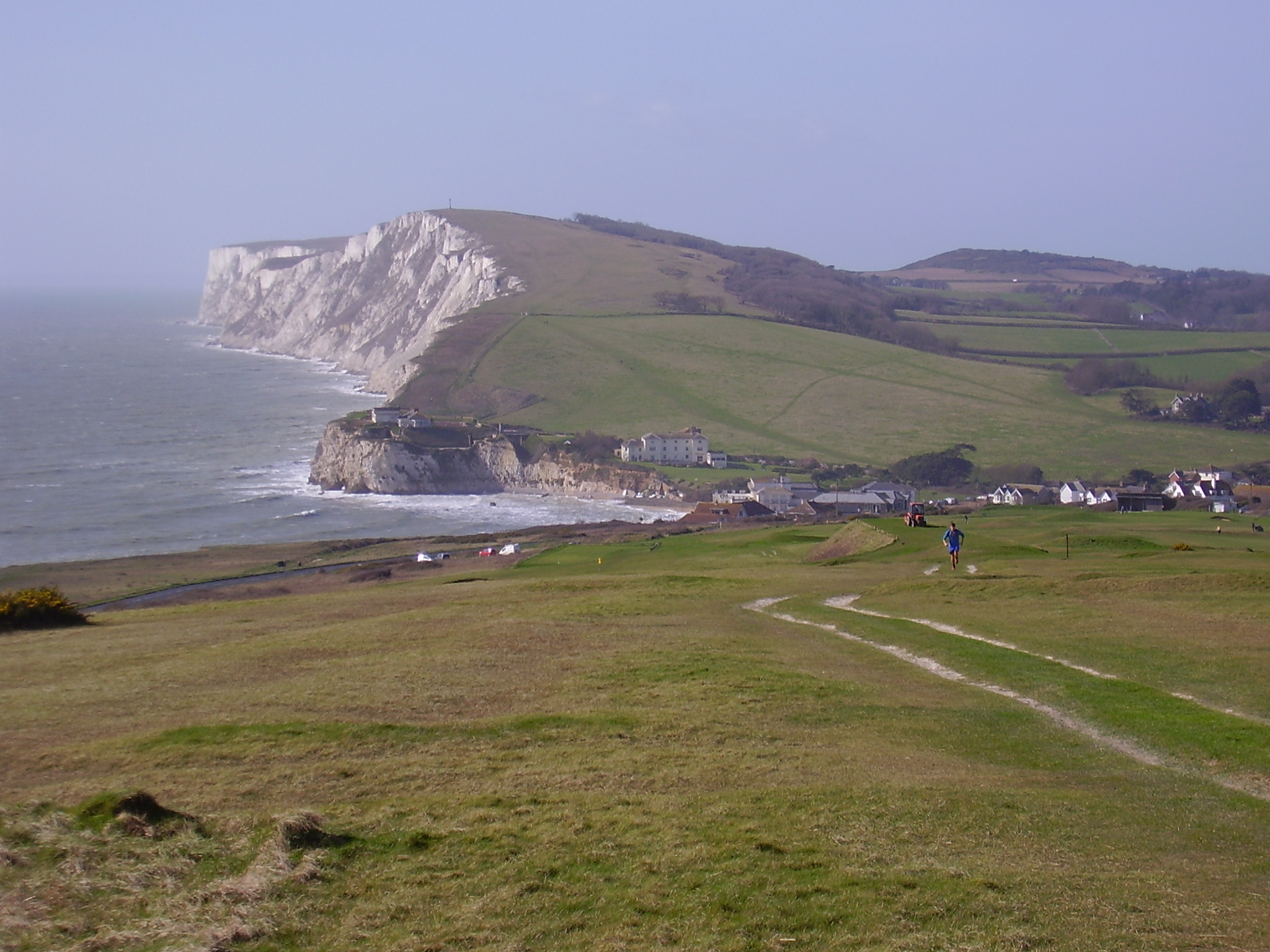
- Tennyson Down (chalk cliffs beyond bay)

Highest point
- Elevation: 147 m (482 ft)
- Prominence: 147 m (482 ft)
- Listing: (none)

Geography
- Location: Isle of Wight, England
- OS grid: SZ325853
- Topo map: OS Landranger 196

Tennyson Down is a hill at the west end of the Isle of Wight just south of Totland. Tennyson Down is a grassy, whale-backed ridge of chalk which rises to 482 ft/147m above sea level. Tennyson Down is named after the poet Lord Tennyson who lived at nearby Farringford House for nearly 40 years. The poet used to walk on the down almost every day, saying that the air was worth 'sixpence a pint'.

== Overview ==
It is part of the chalk ridge that forms the backbone of the Isle of Wight, this ridge extends to the west for 3 miles (4.8 km) where it ends with The Needles. To the east the hill descends gently down to Freshwater Bay where the sea has cut through the ridge. To the south is Highdown Cliffs, a near vertical chalk cliff drop of over 100 metres to the sea below.

The top of the Down is fairly flat and is predominantly grass downland which provides a wide area for walking. There is some scrubland and small trees mainly on the northern side which is away from the prevailing wind.

The Down is owned and managed by the National Trust and is grazed by cattle and rabbits which ensures that its grass surface is closely cropped. It is open to the public.

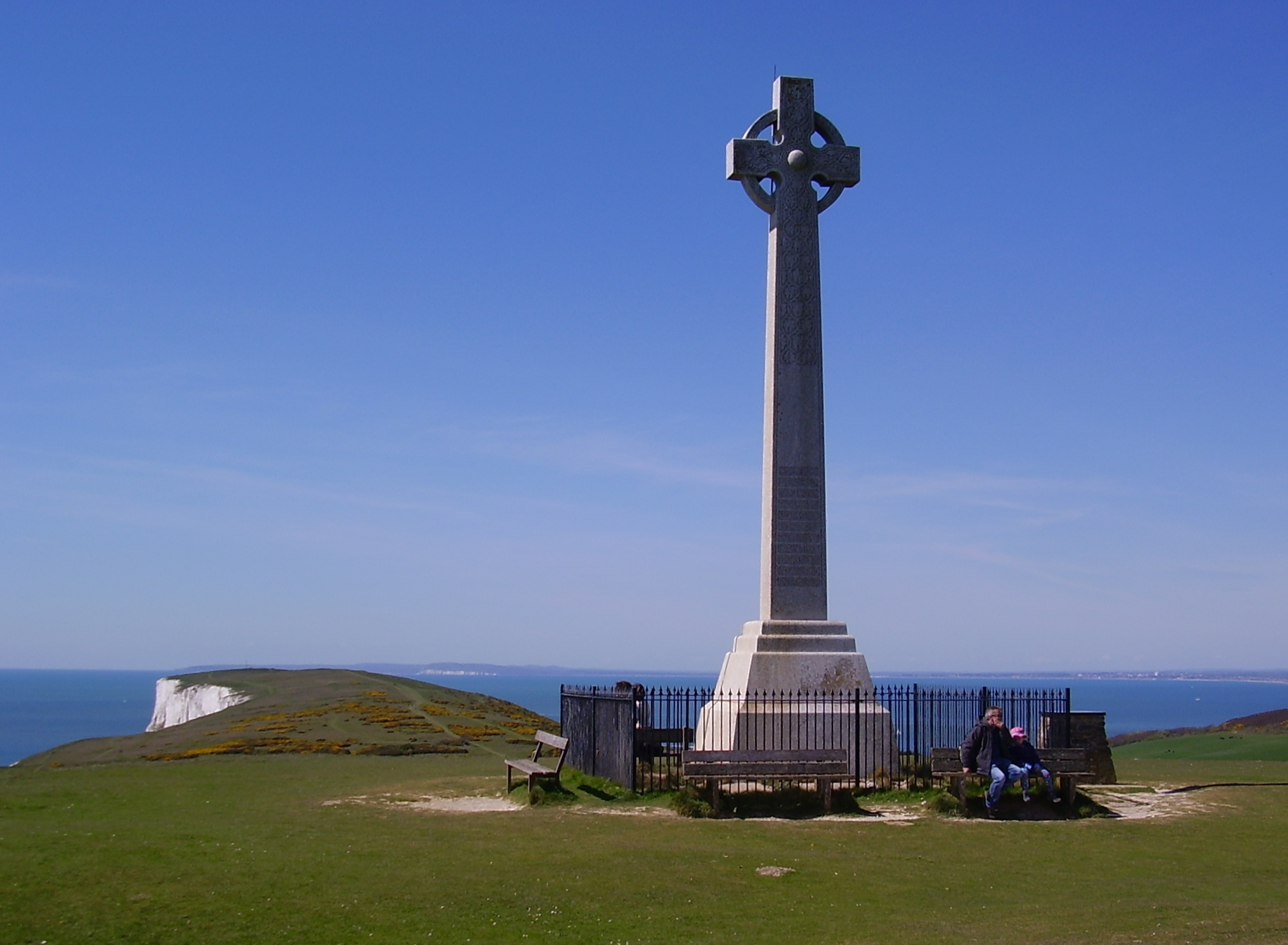
The Tennyson Monument on Tennyson Down, with the Dorset coastline in the distance

At the top of the Down at a height of 147m stands a huge granite cross commemorating the life of Alfred Lord Tennyson. From here on a clear day it is possible to see Old Harry Rocks and the Isle of Purbeck to the west, Yarmouth and Lymington to the north, and to the east, much of the Solent, Fawley Oil Refinery, a large part of the western half of the Isle of Wight, and St. Catherine's Point, 20 km away across Brighstone Bay. Surprisingly it is not possible to see the Needles from here as they are hidden beyond the next hill to the west which is known as West High Down.

The Tennyson Trail, an Isle of Wight footpath, passes right along Tennyson Down and also makes up part of the Isle of Wight Coast Path in this area.

Tennyson Down is one of the most significant downland sites in Britain. It forms the western end of the Tennyson Heritage Coast. It is part of the Headon Warren And West High Down SSSI (Site of Special Scientific Interest) and is part of the Isle of Wight's Area of Outstanding Natural Beauty.

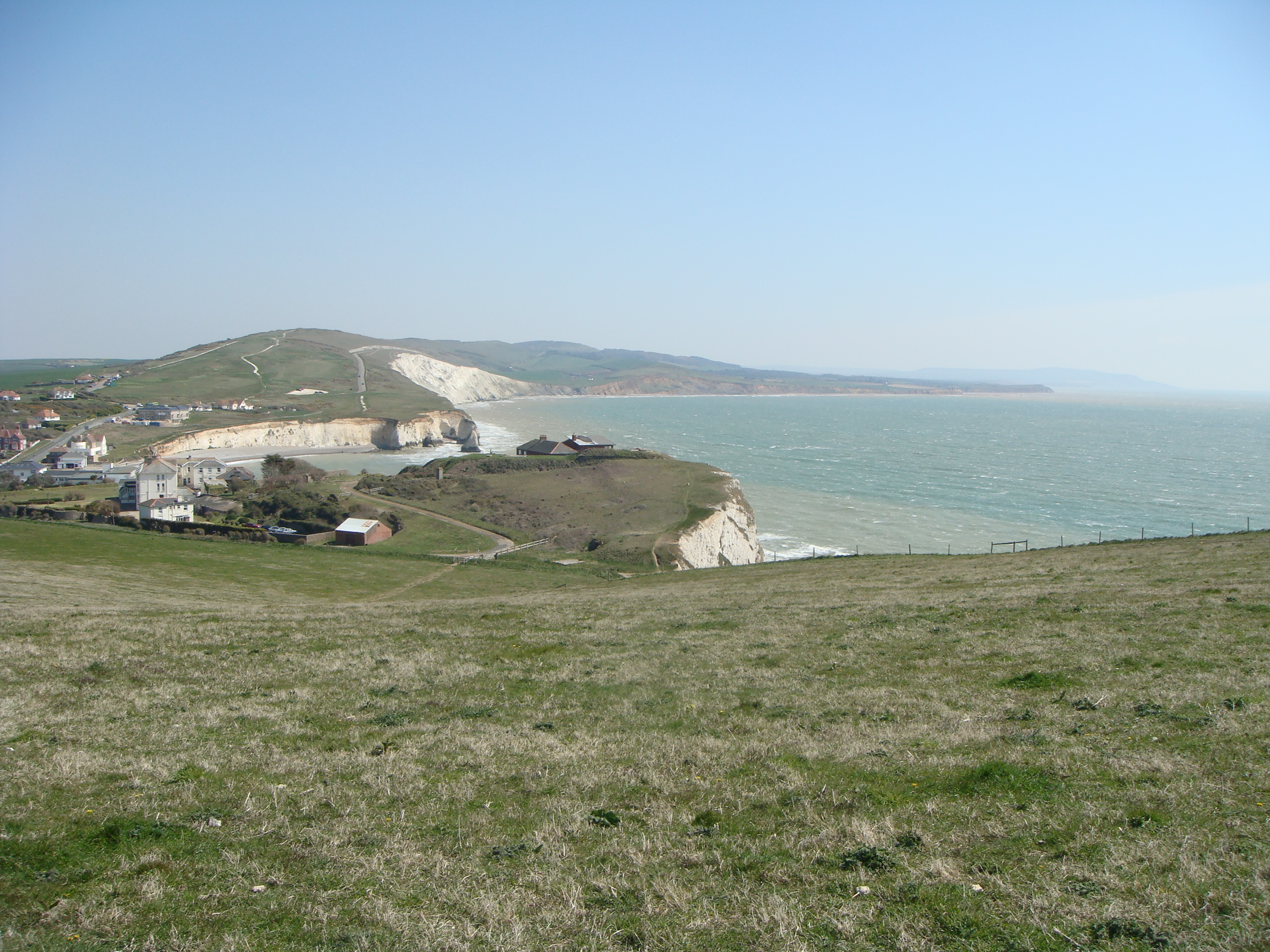
From Eastern side of Tennyson Down; looking towards Freshwater Bay

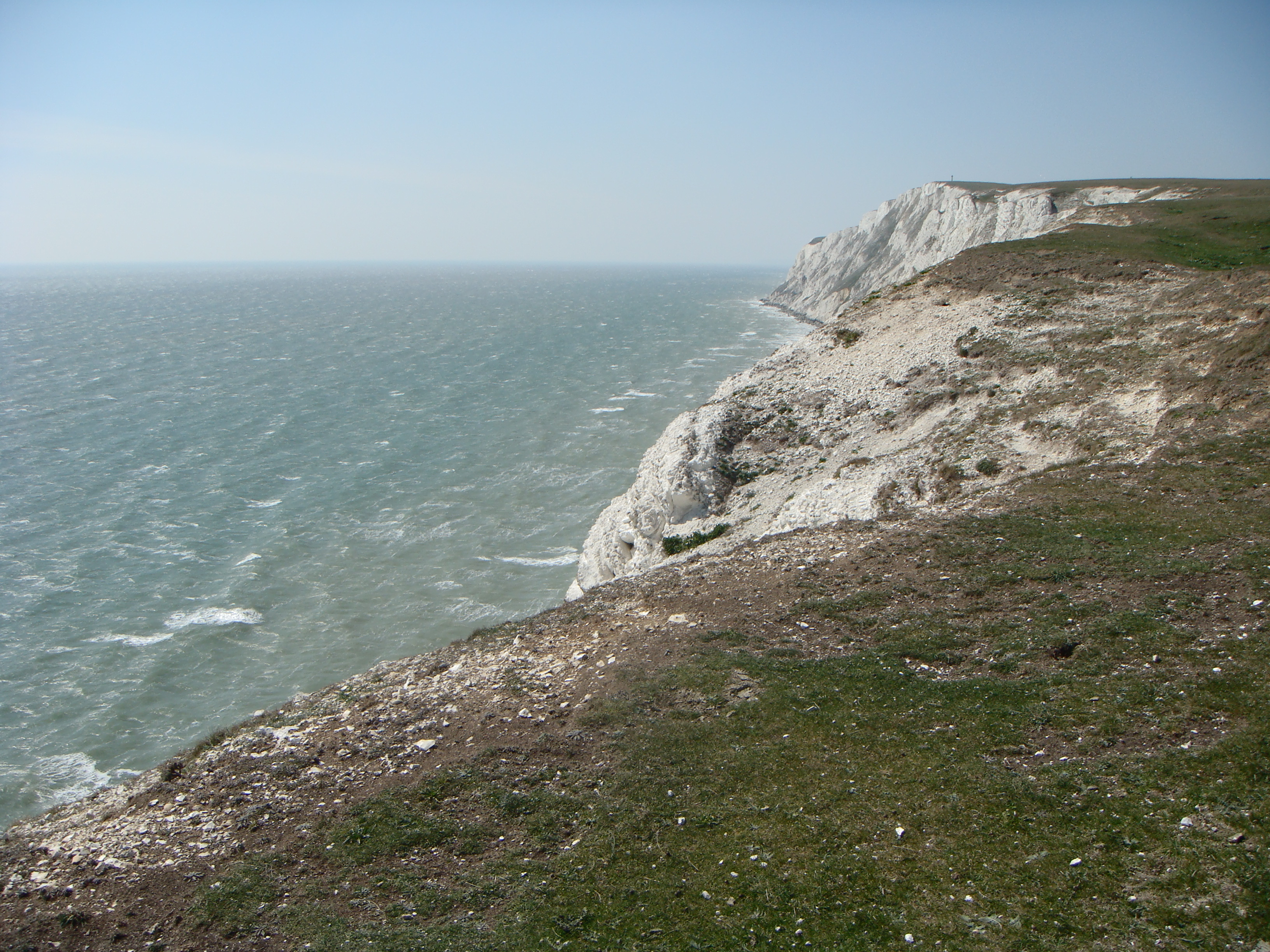
The Monument in the far distance

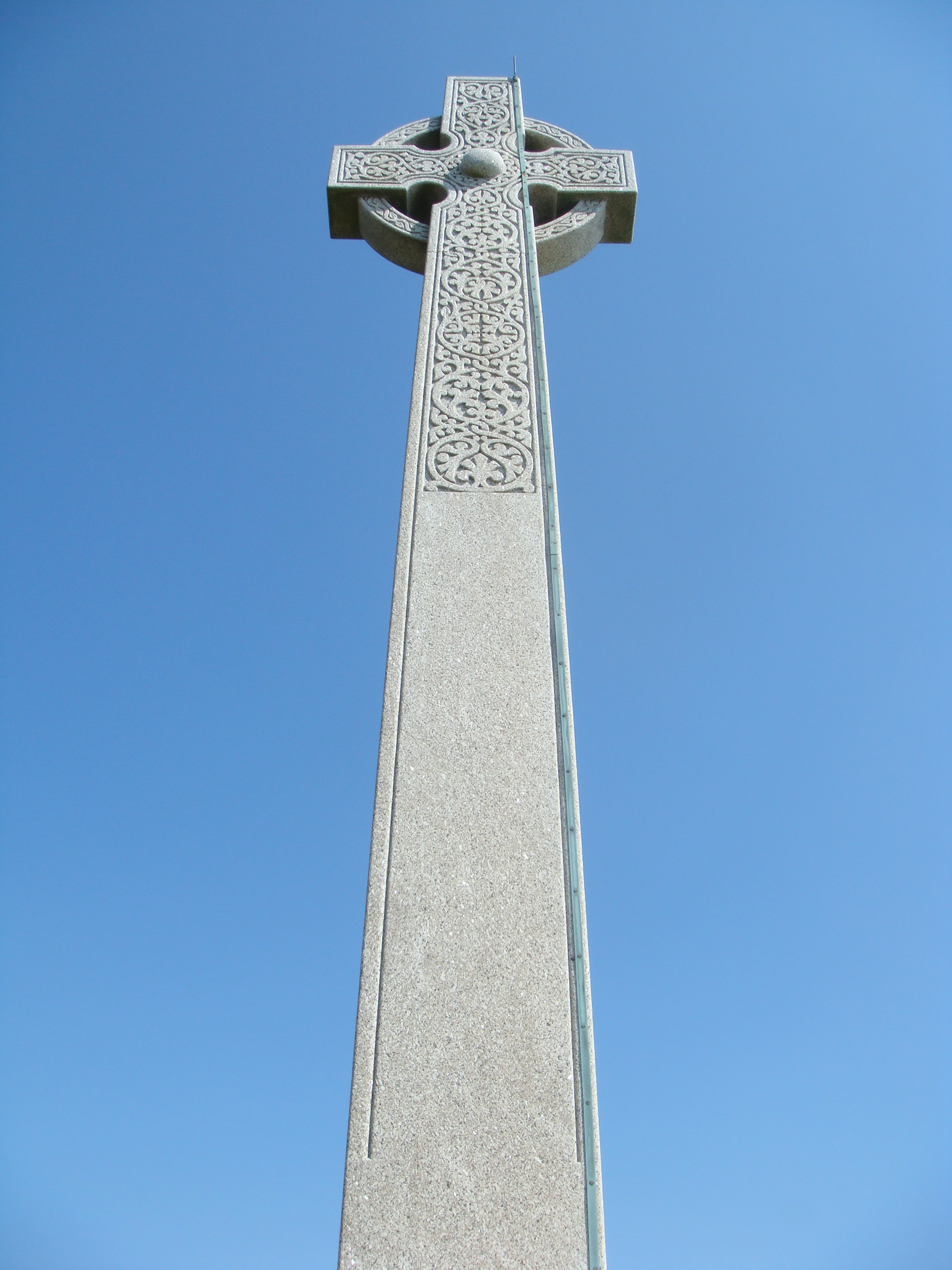
Close-up of Monument

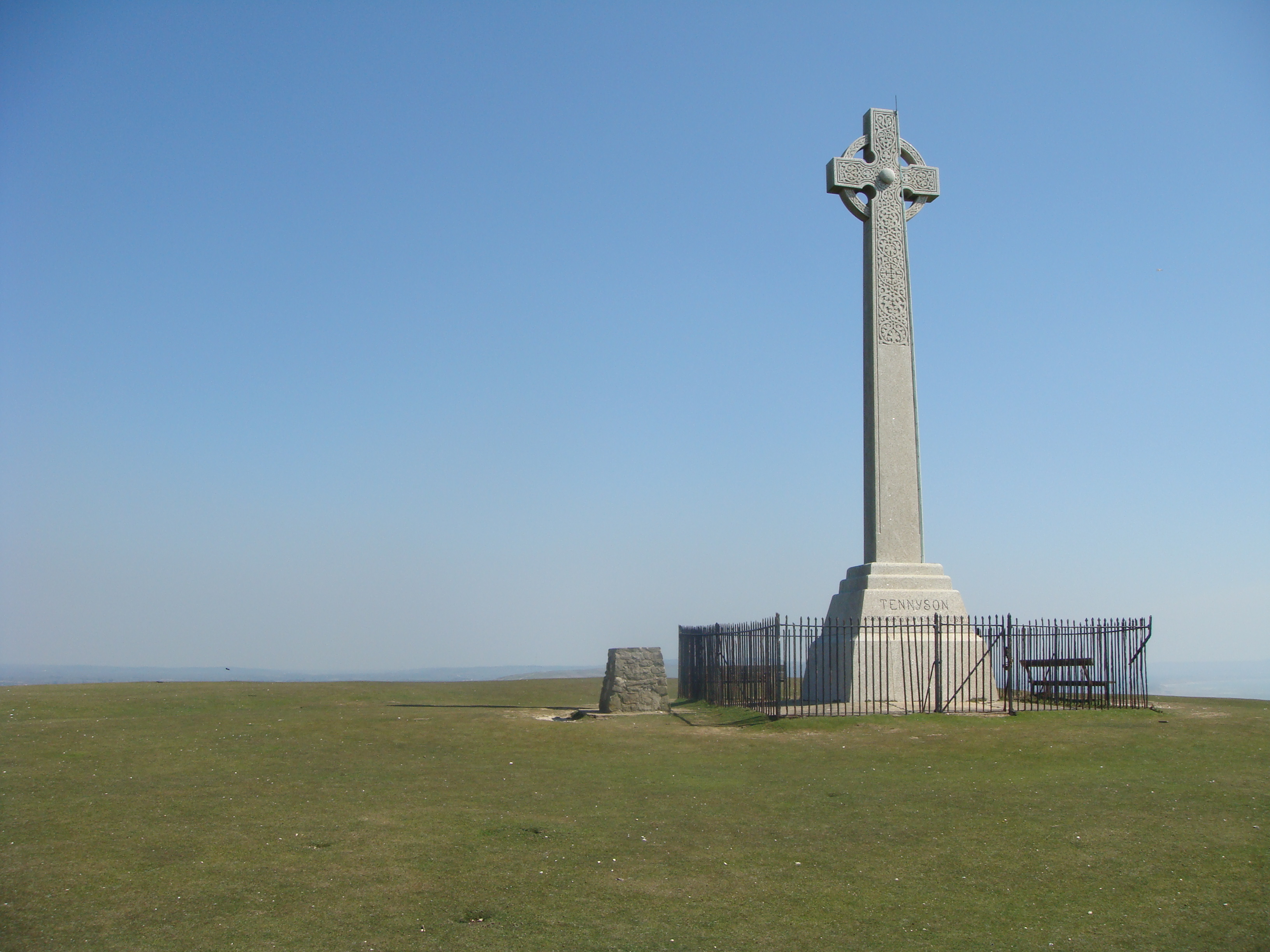
Western face of Tennyson Monument

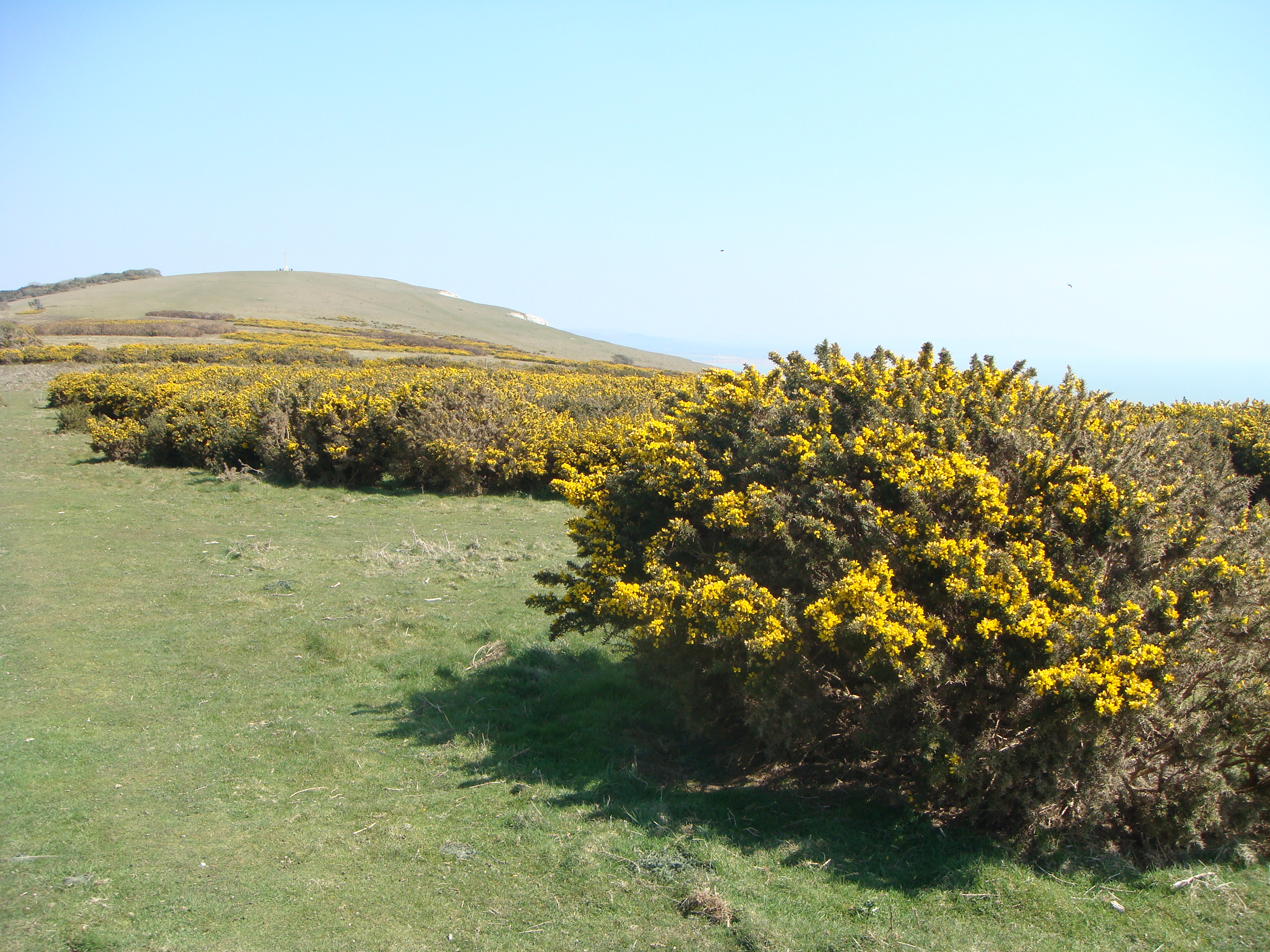
Shrubbery of Tennyson Down

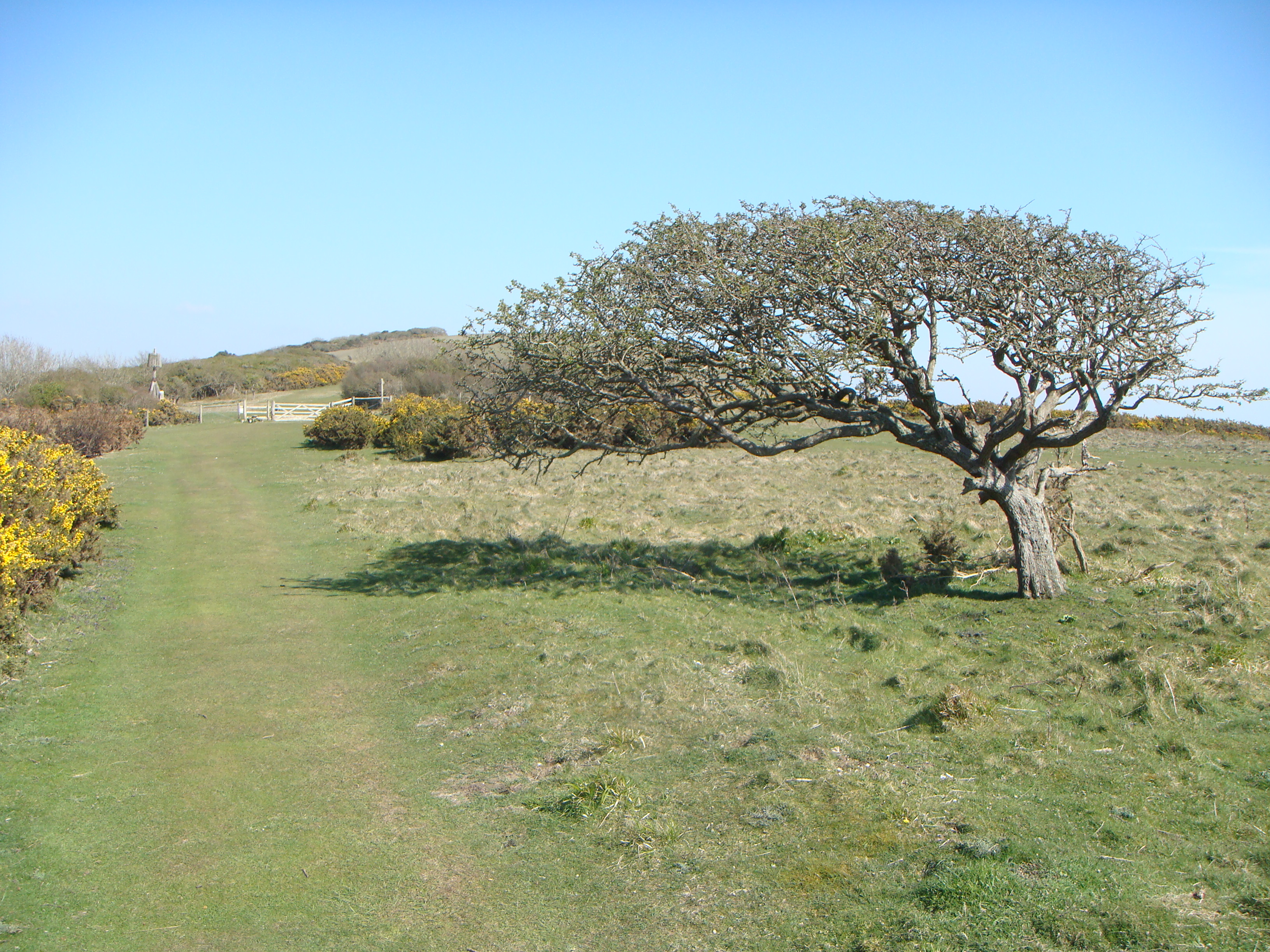
Trees face heavy wind thus grow in interesting shapes

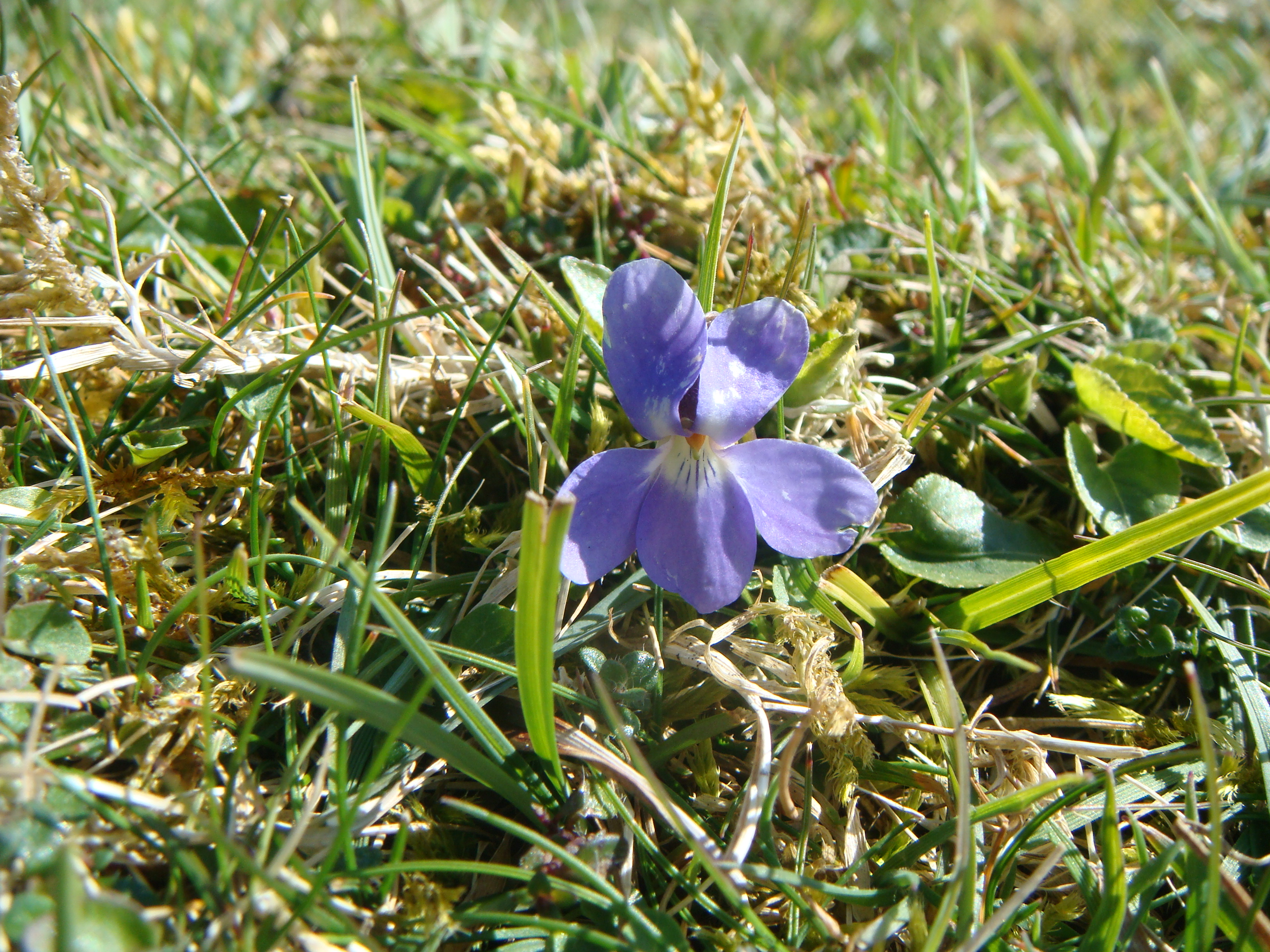
Tiny purple flower found on Tennyson Down

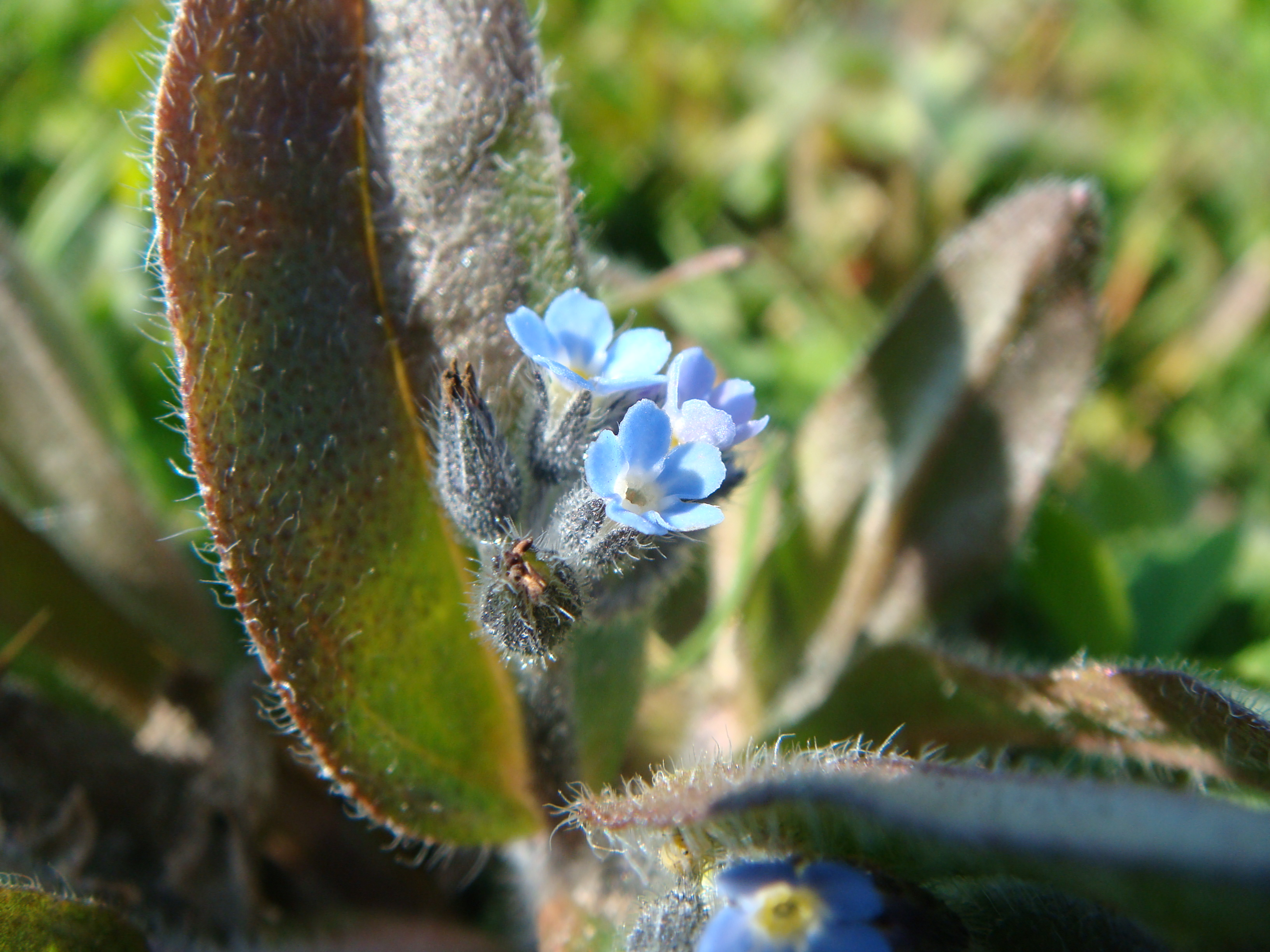
Tiny blue flower found on Tennyson Down
