= Finkley Down =

Hamlet in Hampshire, England

Coordinates: 51.220110°N 1.446773°W

- Location within Hampshire
- OS grid reference: SU3872348247
- District: Test Valley
- Shire county: Hampshire
- Region: South East
- Country: England
- Sovereign state: United Kingdom
- Post town: Andover
- Postcode district: SP11
- Dialling code: 01264
- Police: Hampshire and Isle of Wight
- Fire: Hampshire and Isle of Wight
- Ambulance: South Central
- UK Parliament: North West Hampshire

Finkley Down is a suburb and hamlet in the civil parish of Finkley in Hampshire, England. It is in the civil parish of Smannell. Its nearest town is Andover, which lies approximately 2.4 miles (4.5 km) south-west from the suburb. The suburb is made up of a few industrial estates and a farm.
