= Westover Down =

Chalk hill on the Isle of Wight, England

Coordinates: 50.66057°N 1.42696°W

Westover Down / Harboro
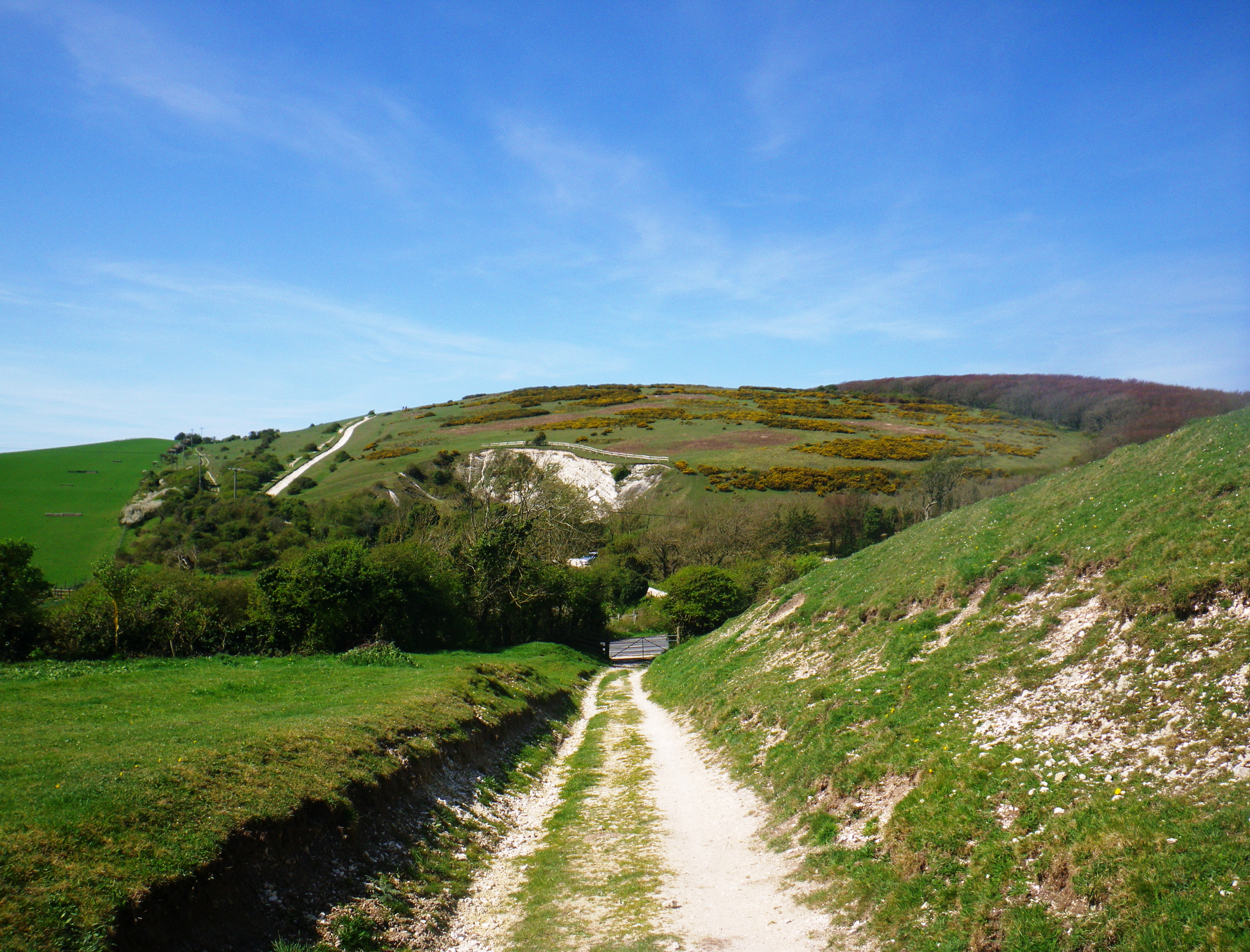
- Towards Westover Down

Highest point
- Elevation: 203 m (666 ft)
- Prominence: 78 m (256 ft)

Geography
- Location: Isle of Wight, England
- OS grid: SZ406847
- Topo map: OS Landranger 196

Westover Down is a chalk down on the Isle of Wight, England. It is located close to the village of Brook, in the southwest of the island, and rises to 203 m (666 ft) at its highest point, Harboro, northeast of the village. Harboro has a prominence of 78 m (256 ft) and is classed as a Tump.
