= Abbotts Ann Down =

Village in Hampshire, England

Coordinates: 51.181602°N 1.527033°W

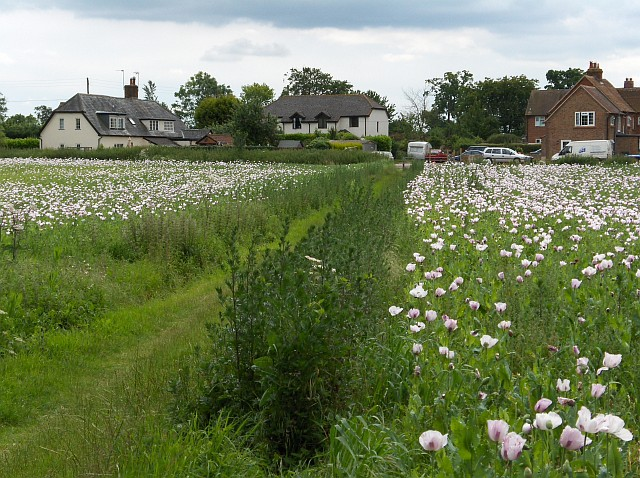

- Location within Hampshire
- OS grid reference: SU331425
- Civil parish: Abbotts Ann
- District: Test Valley
- Shire county: Hampshire
- Region: South East
- Country: England
- Sovereign state: United Kingdom
- Post town: ANDOVER
- Postcode district: SP11
- Dialling code: 01264
- Police: Hampshire and Isle of Wight
- Fire: Hampshire and Isle of Wight
- Ambulance: South Central
- UK Parliament: Hampshire

Abbotts Ann Down is a hamlet in Hampshire, England, within the civil parish of Abbotts Ann.

The settlement lies on the A343 road and is approximately 3 miles (4.8 km) south-west of Andover.
