= Duncan Down =

Coordinates: 51.3300°N 1.0157°E

- Location within Kent
- OS grid reference: TR107667
- District: City of Canterbury
- Shire county: Kent
- Region: South East
- Country: England
- Sovereign state: United Kingdom
- Post town: Whitstable
- Police: Kent
- Fire: Kent
- Ambulance: South East Coast
- UK Parliament: Canterbury

Duncan Down is an open, public, area to the south west of Whitstable and is the largest village green in the United Kingdom. It is a 21 hectare (52 acre) area of grass and woodland incorporating four ponds and a brook. The area is maintained by the Friends of Duncan Down with assistance from Canterbury City Council and has received funding from nearby planning development. Originally intended for housing development in the inter-war years it is now protected by its village green status.

== History ==
At the beginning of the twentieth century a plan was produced that would have involved the development of a large part of the downs for housing. Two very small sections of this plan were built but the remaining sections were never implemented. Until World War II the downs were grassland but during the war the government directed that they should undergo cultivation and flax and other crops were planted. After the war the area remained under cultivation, mainly for hay until problems of vandalism made continued use unprofitable. Throughout the 1980s Canterbury City Council provided minimal management of the area manly consisting of grass cutting and rubbish removal.

Since the 1960s five village greens have been registered. These, together, now comprise the area known by the name: Duncan Down. The first, VG124, an area of scrub and woodland to the northeast of the site was registered in 1969. The second area, originally cultivated farmland, which forms the major part of the site was registered in 1992. The third, fourth and fifth areas, VG240, VG256, VG 262 comprising woodland, were registered in 2007 and 2011 and 2012 respectively.

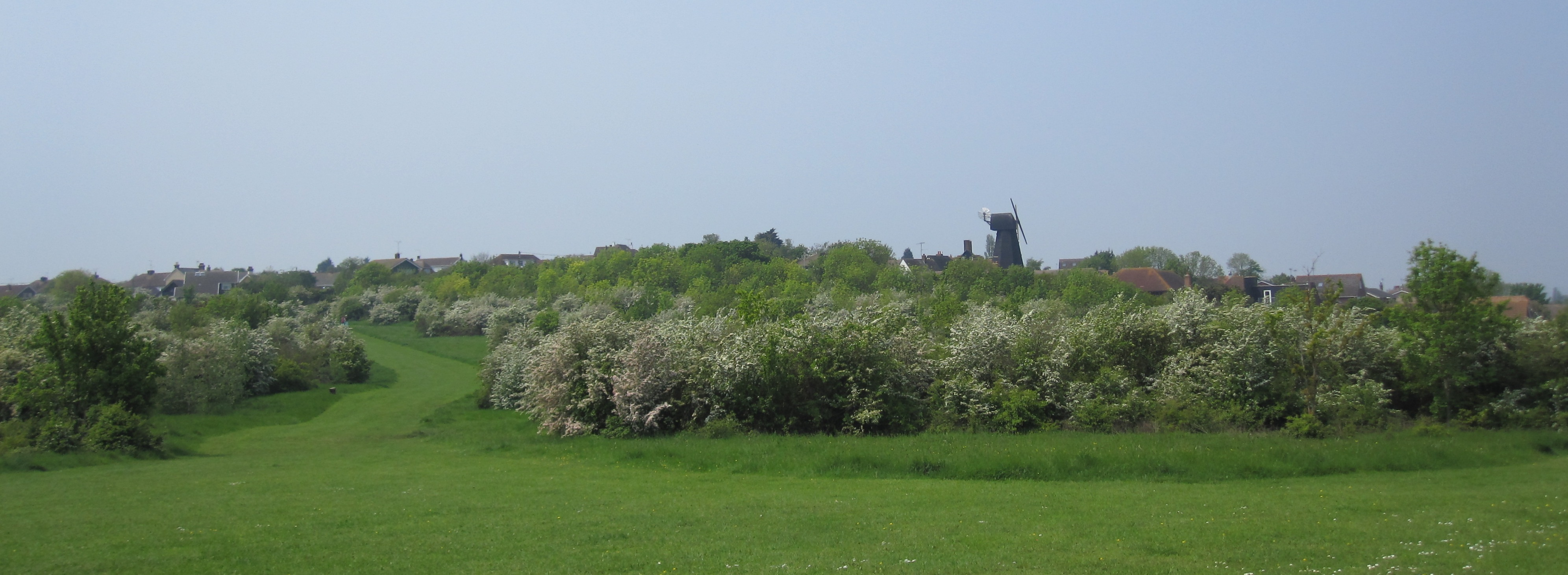
A view across part of the downs to the windmill and showing the mass of hawthorn in bloom

In 2020, a significant stone circle was installed on the site. Intended as a site of reflection, the site has also attracted controversy as a local fertility shrine On occasion, individuals leave ribbons and coloured ropes around the stones when making offerings for divine assistance with fertility and sexual prowess.

== Ownership ==
The local council, Canterbury City Council is the main landowner. There are several plots of land under private ownership but the majority of the land has no registered owner.

== Grassland ==
Approximately one quarter of the area of the downs is set aside as grassland which provides food for insects, birds, and the significant rabbit population. Although this grassland would ideally be controlled by animal grazing, the lack of ruminants on the site means that an annual hay harvest is undertaken.

Grass types present include perennial rye, sheep's fescue, sweet vernal, and timothy.

Flowering plants within the grassland areas include: birdsfoot trefoil, buttercup, clover, flax, ox-eye daisy, and vetch. The clover is of particular importance as bacteria within the root system fix nitrogen in the soil which is then used by other plants. Poppies appear occasionally but are rare as the soil is not disturbed.

Slowworms and lizards are found within the grassland existing on insects and slugs.

== Scrubland ==
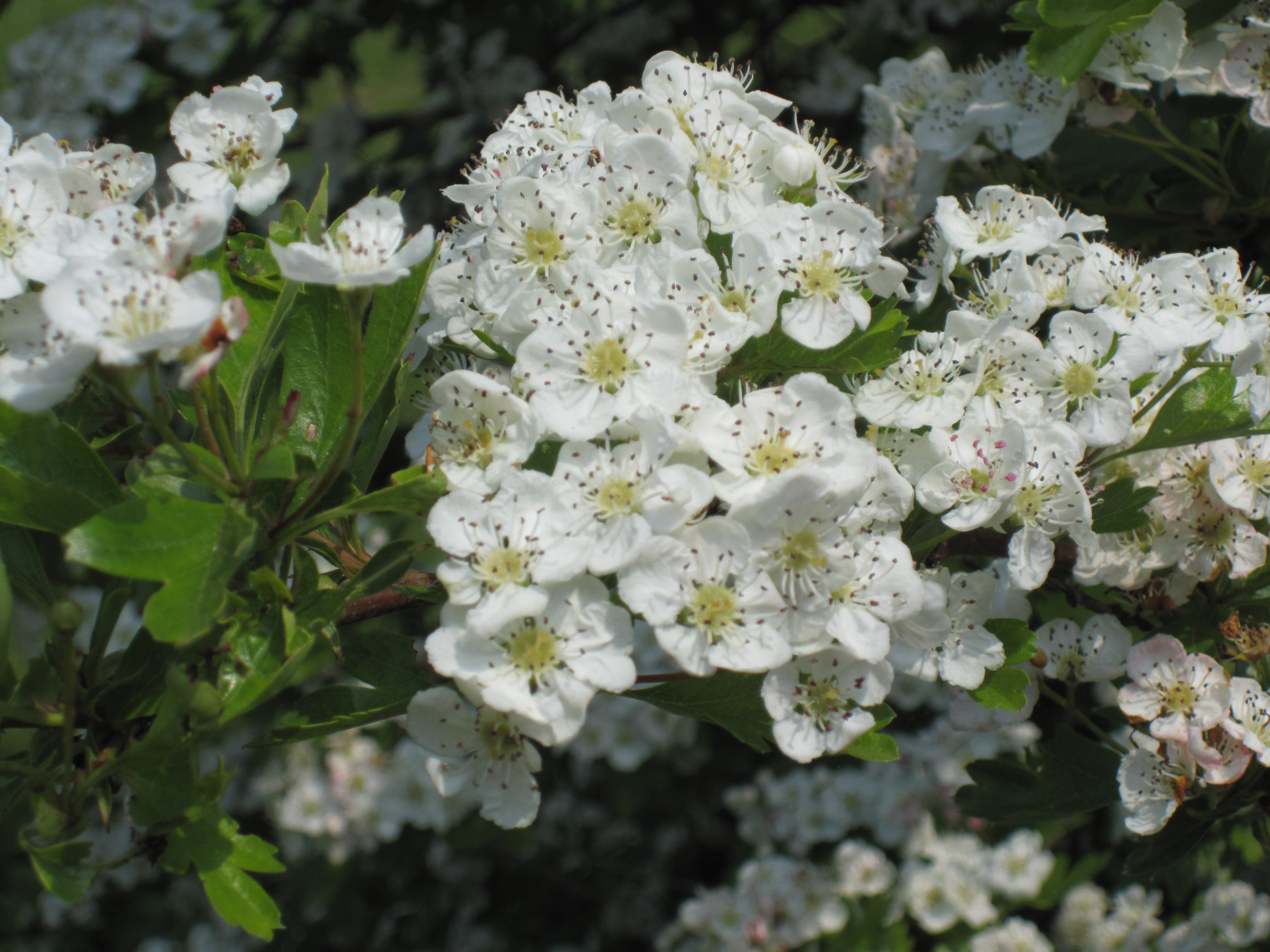
Hawthorn flowering in late spring on Duncan Down

Scrubland forms around one fifth of the downs and is an important feature of the assisted evolution of the site. It is the natural result of leaving an area uncultivated and consists of a broad mixture of native tree species, mainly oak and ash. The scrub consists of hawthorn, dog rose, blackthorn (also known as sloe), and blackberry (bramble). As the scrubland matures areas of it are cut back leaving semi-mature trees standing. In some areas, clearings are made and various native species are planted. Bird ringing is undertaken at this location to assist in research into the behaviour, particularly migratory patterns, of the resident birds.

== Woodland ==
Approximately half of the down is woodland. There are three named woods: Trench Wood, Gorrell Wood, and Benacre Wood. Trench and Gorrel woods have formed over the last 50–60 years from scrub land but Benacre Wood is a remnant of an ancient forest that once covered around 1214 hectare (3000 acres) of the locality. Trench Wood is so named because of the defensive trench workings that remain from World War II, Gorrell Wood is named for the stream which runs through it and Benacre Wood is the last surviving part of an ancient blean remaining near the town of Whitstable.

The oak is the predominant species of tree forming the woodland but yew and holly, both of which can survive below the canopy of oak leaves are in evidence. Various other trees including field maple and hazel can be found. As evidence of its age, Benacre wood is host to large quantities of bluebells in the spring. Other flowering plants present include primrose, snowdrop, and celandine. Non flowering plants include ivy. Various fungi are present including bracket fungi which are largely responsible for the natural recycling of dead wood.

In 2011 an area of hawthorn was removed from Trench Wood and a collection of native tree species was planted.

== Stream and ponds ==
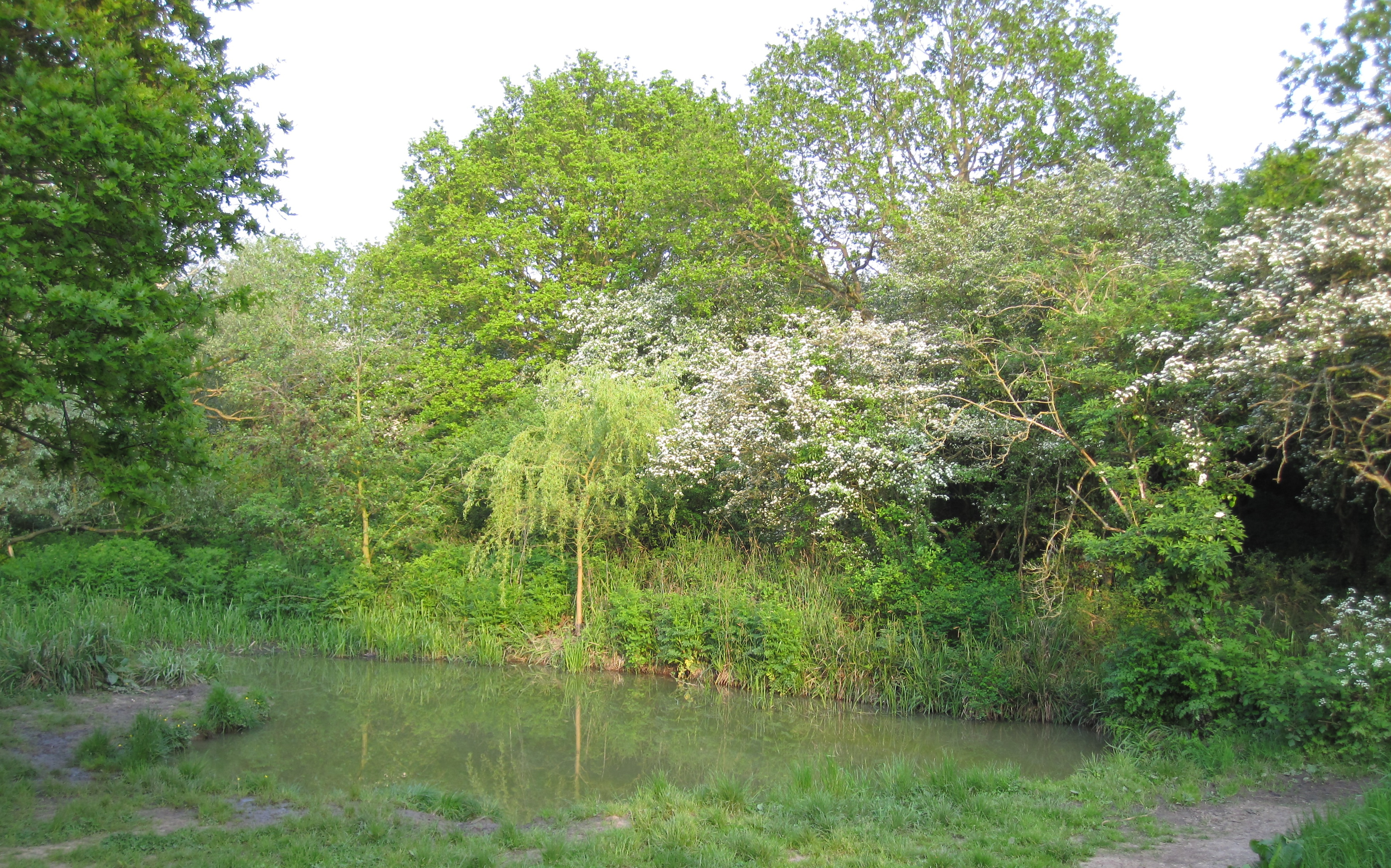
View of one of the expanded ponds with a newly planted weeping willow.

The Gorrell Stream runs through the downs providing a valuable source of water. During the summer there is only a very slow flow of water which may dry up completely during dry periods. During the winter the flow can become torrential which keeps the channel clear.

Four ponds have been created to provide a more reliable source of water for the local wildlife. Frogs, newts, and toads have all been identified in the ponds and the margins provide reed and rush cover for the young froglets which are otherwise taken by various predators including birds and grass snakes.

The banks of the stream are home to a number of old willows which provide a home for woodpeckers. Bats are also present in the older trees.

== Green flag award ==
The downs have been awarded successive green flags since 2005 indicating a well maintained and cared for public green area.

== Wildlife ==
Various types of wildlife can be found the different types of habitat of the downs.

=== Ponds ===
The ponds support frogs, newts and toads. Insects present include dragonfly, mayfly, and waterboatmen (notonectidae).

=== Grassland ===
Slowworms, grass snakes, lizards, and some small rodents occupy the grassland.

=== Scrub and woodland ===
Various rodents including squirrels and mice, together with small mammals such as foxes, and rabbits are to be found in this habitat. Resident birds include blackbird, blue tit, chaffinch, great tit, wood pigeon, owls, and woodpecker. Bats are also known to be present on the site.

== Maintenance ==
The maintenance of the down is undertaken by The Friends of Duncan Down and Canterbury City Council. Wardens approved by both parties under a memorandum of understanding carry out day-to-day maintenance and oversee the use of heavy machinery by outside contractors including the council's contractor: Serco. In addition the 'Friends of Duncan Down' organise a wide variety of community based activities for the improvement of the area including monitoring of the site, planting of spring bulbs, path clearing, tree work, small works and the construction of seating benches and bridges.

== Provision for activities ==
A small area at one corner of the downs has been set aside as a playing field and goals have been installed there. Local Girl Guides and Scouts and children from St Alphege Infants School use the site for educational purposes and the Friends provide expert guides for these activities.

== Expansion ==
In September 2011 a proposal was put forward by a property company that they would donate a significant amount of land for the expansion of the downs if they were allowed to build a new housing development nearby. Following a meeting of the Planning Committee in 2016 outline planning permission was granted and this provided for a 40-acre expansion of the site of which some 5 acres will be used for amenity purposes, car parking and allotments but the remaining 35 acres is scheduled to be added to the site as village green with the whole site to be renamed as the Gorrell Valley Nature Reserve.
