= Northington Down =

Hamlet in Hampshire, England

Coordinates: 51.133295°N 1.209785°W

- Location within Hampshire
- OS grid reference: SU5538837410
- District: Winchester
- Shire county: Hampshire
- Region: South East
- Country: England
- Sovereign state: United Kingdom
- Post town: ALRESFORD
- Postcode district: SO24
- Police: Hampshire and Isle of Wight
- Fire: Hampshire and Isle of Wight
- Ambulance: South Central
- UK Parliament: Winchester

Northington Down is a hamlet in the civil parish of Northington in the City of Winchester district of Hampshire, England. Its nearest town is New Alresford, which lies approximately 4.2 miles (6.8 km) south-east from the hamlet.
