= Bin Down =

Hill in Cornwall, England

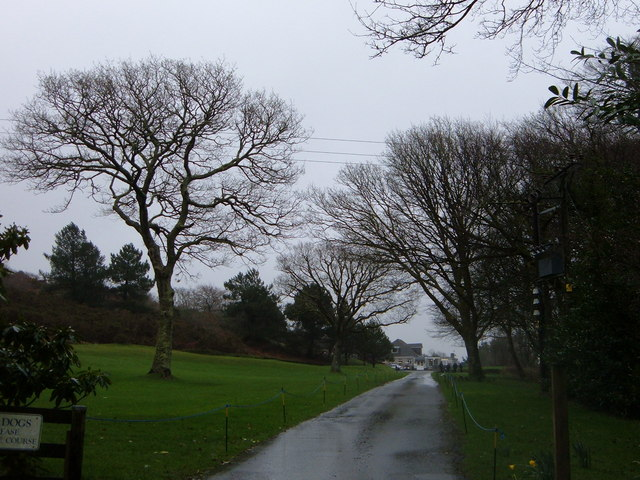
- Entrance to Looe Golf Club on the slopes of Bin Down.

Highest point
- Elevation: 203 m (666 ft)
- Prominence: 101 m (331 ft)
- Listing: HuMP
- Coordinates: 50.3951°N 4.4263°W

Geography
- Location: Cornish Killas, England
- OS grid: SX276578
- Topo map: OS Landranger 201, Explorer 107

Bin Down is a hill, 203 metres (666 ft) high near Liskeard in the county of Cornwall, England. Its prominence of 101 metres qualifies it as a HuMP.

Bin Down is located near the south Cornish coast, about 6 kilometres NNE of Looe. Its summit lies within the grounds of Looe Golf Course, near the 7th tee. There is a trig point near the summit.
