= Headon Warren and West High Down SSSI =

Protected area on the Isle of Wight, England

Coordinates: 50.666°N 1.563°W

Headon Warren And West High Down
- Site of Special Scientific Interest
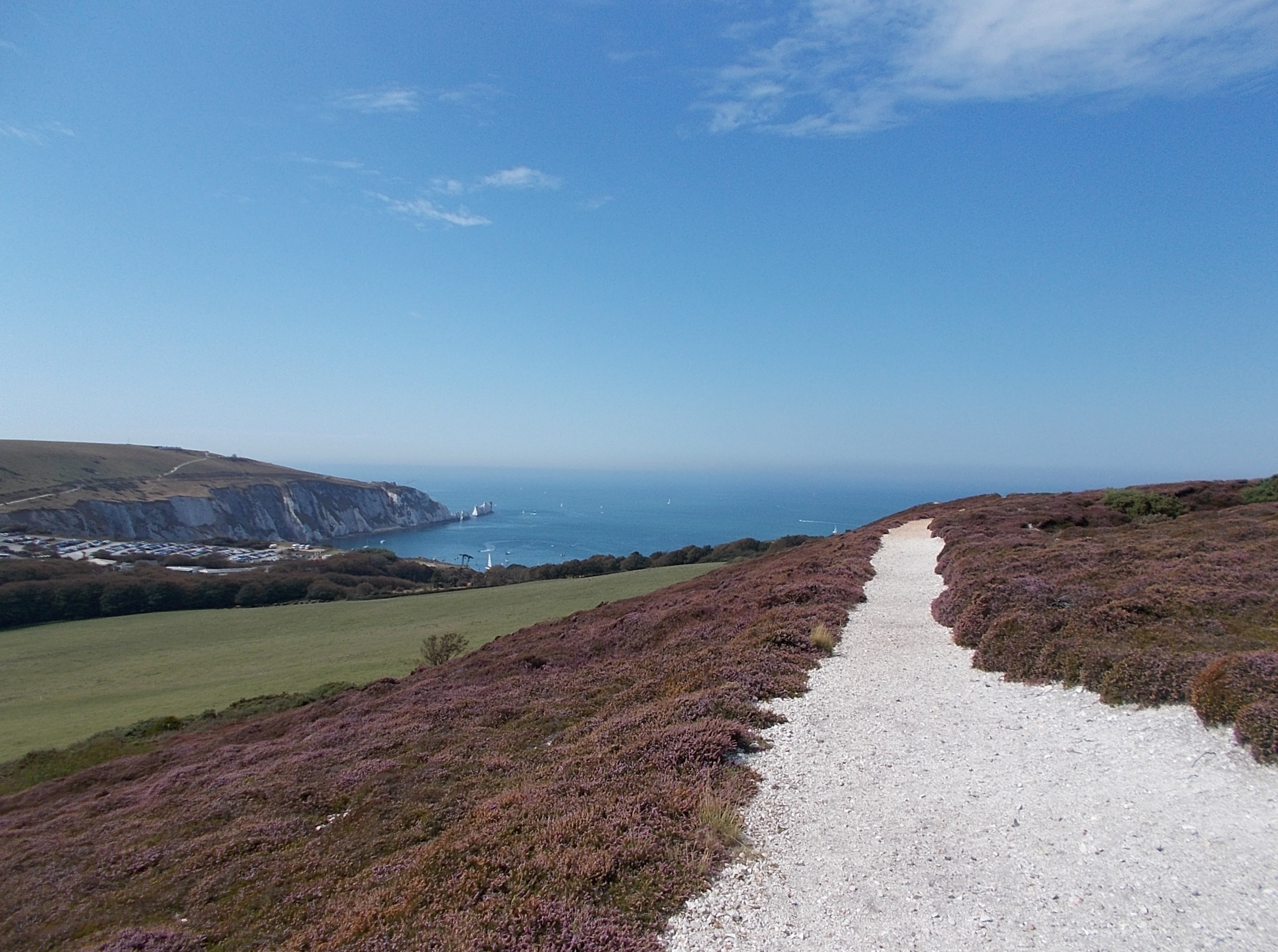
- View from Headon Warren towards West High Down and the Needles
- Location of Headon Warren And West High Down.
- Area of search: Isle of Wight
- Grid reference: SZ316852
- Interest: Biological and Geological
- Area: 276.3 ha (683 acres)
- Notification date: 1951

Headon Warren and West High Down is a 276.3-hectare (683-acre) Site of Special Scientific Interest (SSSI) located at the westernmost end of the Isle of Wight. The SSSI encompasses Headon Warren, a heather clad down to the north, the chalk downs of West High Down and Tennyson Down to the south, and the Needles, The Needles Batteries and Alum Bay to the west.

The site was notified in 1951 by the Nature Conservancy Council (NCC), for both its biological and geological features, and that designation is now maintained by Natural England as successor body to the NCC. Most of the land within the SSSI is owned and managed by the National Trust.

== The SSSI ==
Headon Warren is an example of a lowland acid heath and West High Down and Tennyson Down are chalk ridges with a rich calcareous grassland community; the close proximity of these two different plant communities in a maritime setting is of scientific interest. The vegetation on the warren is dominated by heather, bell heather, gorse and dwarf gorse. There is a ground cover of heathland plants, and the Dartford warbler breeds here. There are also areas of scrubland, and the cliffs of The Needles, The Needles Batteries and Alum Bay are included in the site.

The chalk downland has a typical flora of calcareous maritime grassland, with nine species of orchids and large populations of such rare plants as early gentian and tufted centaury. On the cliffs, the rare plants hoary stock and rock samphire grow. Breeding birds on the cliffs include herring gull, fulmar, kittiwake, cormorant and shag, with smaller populations of razorbill, puffin and guillemot, and the peregrine falcon also breeds here.

The coast between Alum Bay and Totland Bay is of interest geologically, providing a complete sequence of the sedimentary rocks from the Chalk Group to the Bembridge Limestone. There are many fossils of mammals and reptiles from the Tertiary period, and an important assemblage of plant fossils.
