= W. J. Nigh =

W. J. Nigh & Sons Limited
- Company type: Private limited company
- Industry: Manufacturing
- Founded: 1903
- Founder: William James Nigh
- Headquarters: Shanklin, Isle of Wight
- Owner: Nigh family (Privately owned)

W. J. Nigh & Sons Limited is a privately owned British manufacturer of toys, beach goods, giftware, souvenirs, promotional merchandise, stationery, greeting cards, diaries, calendars, confectionery, and Christmas decorations, cards, novelties and toys.

W. J. Nigh was founded by William James Nigh in Ventnor, Isle of Wight, as a postcard publisher in 1903. In the 1930s, William Nigh was joined in the business by his four sons, and the range expanded into souvenirs and other items.

In 2009, W. J. Nigh was being run by Terry Nigh (grandson of William Nigh) and Adrian, Russell and Rhys Nigh (great-grandsons).

W. J. Nigh is still privately owned and is now run by the fourth generation of the family, two brothers and a cousin, from a purpose-built warehouse in Shanklin, Isle of Wight.
