= Downland =

Area of open chalk hills

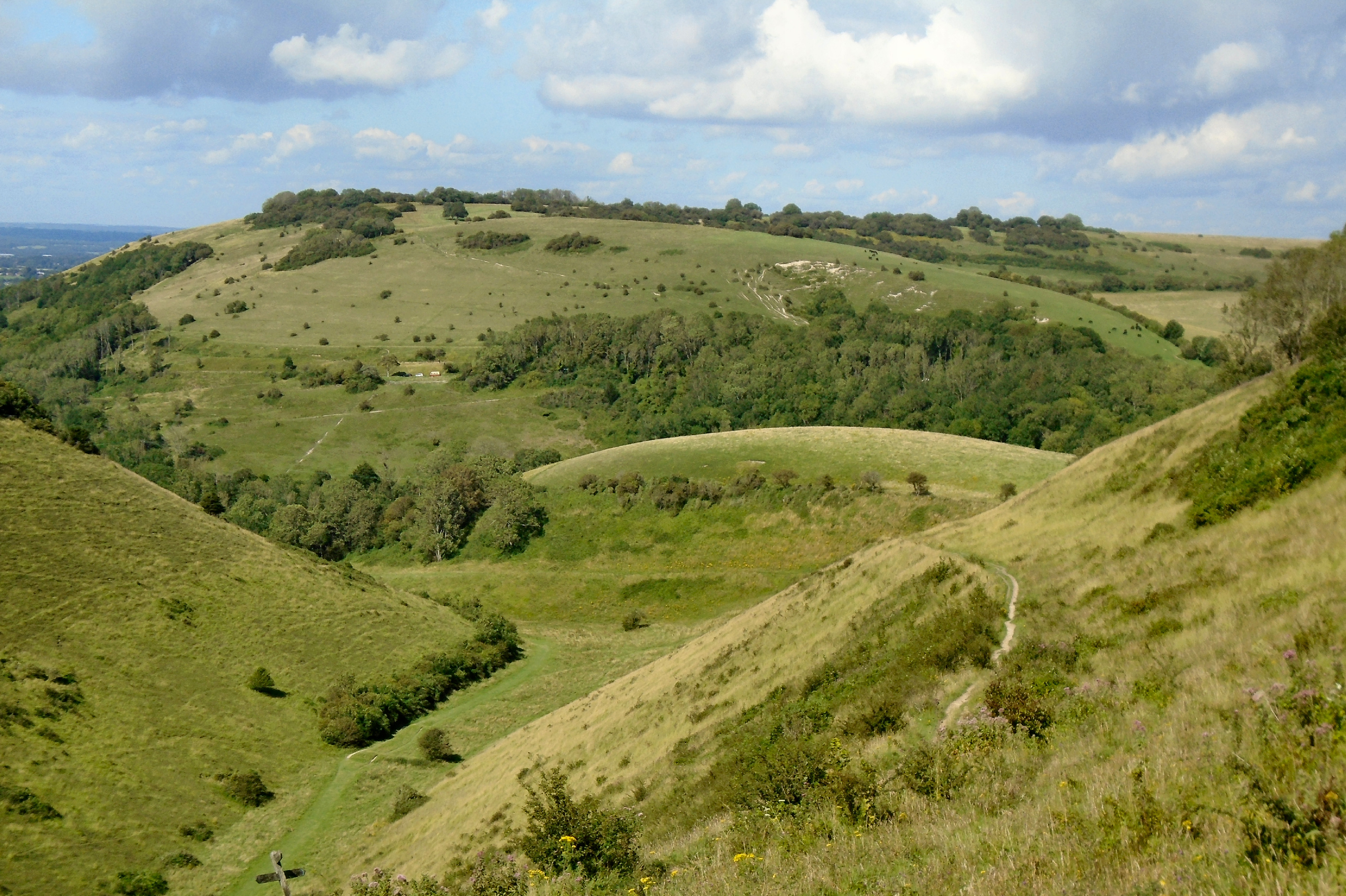
Devil's Dyke, a dry valley in the South Downs

Downland, chalkland, chalk downs, or just downs are areas of open chalk hills, largely turfed with grass, such as the Chiltern Hills and North Downs.

== Etymology ==
This term is used to describe the characteristic landscape of grassy hills in southern England, where chalk and limestone is exposed at the surface. The name "downs" is derived from the Celtic word "dun", meaning "fort" or "fastness" (and by extension "fortified settlement", from which it entered English as "town", similar to Germanic "burg"/"burough"), though the original meaning would have been "hill", as early forts were commonly hillforts - compare Germanic "burg" (fort) and "berg" (mountain).

== Distribution ==
Downland areas in southern England

The largest area of downland in southern England is formed by Salisbury Plain plateau, mainly in Wiltshire. To the southwest, downlands continue via Cranborne Chase into Dorset as the Dorset Downs and southwards through Hampshire as the Hampshire Downs onto the Isle of Wight. To the northeast, downlands continue along the Berkshire Downs and Chiltern Hills through parts of Berkshire, Oxfordshire, Buckinghamshire, Hertfordshire, Bedfordshire and into Cambridgeshire. To the east, the downlands split — divided by the Weald of Sussex and Kent between — forming the North Downs running from Surrey via the southern part of Greater London to Kent, with the South Downs continuing to the southeast into West Sussex and East Sussex. Similar chalk hills are also found further north in Lincolnshire and Yorkshire, where they are known as the Wolds.

Both the English Downs, the Wolds, and the Weald are hilly areas, the distinction between them is that as these downlands have an underlying chalk or limestone rock, which often is at or close to the surface, so this meant that this land was largely turfed with grass and relatively devoid of trees due to the soil being too thin, whereas the Wolds and the Weald, having deeper surface alluvial soil layers, were "forested hills".

== Geology ==
The Chalk Group is a sequence of Upper Cretaceous limestones. The dominant lithology is relatively soft porous white chalk with only poorly defined bedding. The chalk is classified as a biomicrite, with microscopic coccoliths and other fine-grained fossil debris in a matrix of micrite mud. Small amounts of silica were also deposited, mainly from sponge spicules, which moved during diagenesis and accumulated to form flints. The Chalk Group either directly overlies the impermeable uppermost Lower Cretaceous Gault Clay or permeable Upper Greensand Formation above the Gault Clay.

Since its deposition, the chalk in southern England has been uplifted, faulted, fractured and folded by the distant effects of the Alpine Orogeny. The fracturing has greatly increased the chalk's permeability, such that it is a major aquifer. Sedimentary basins formed by rifting during the Triassic to Early Cretaceous were inverted during the Late Paleogene to Miocene leading to the formation of structures such as the Wealden Anticline and the Portland-Wight Monocline. Later erosion has produced the characteristic ridges of the downland landscape. The landscape was further modified during the Quaternary period by the area's proximity to the southern edge of the ice sheets formed during the last ice age. These periglacial effects included significant amounts of dissolution of the chalk and the modification of existing valleys due to a combination of frozen ground and snowmelt.

== Formation ==
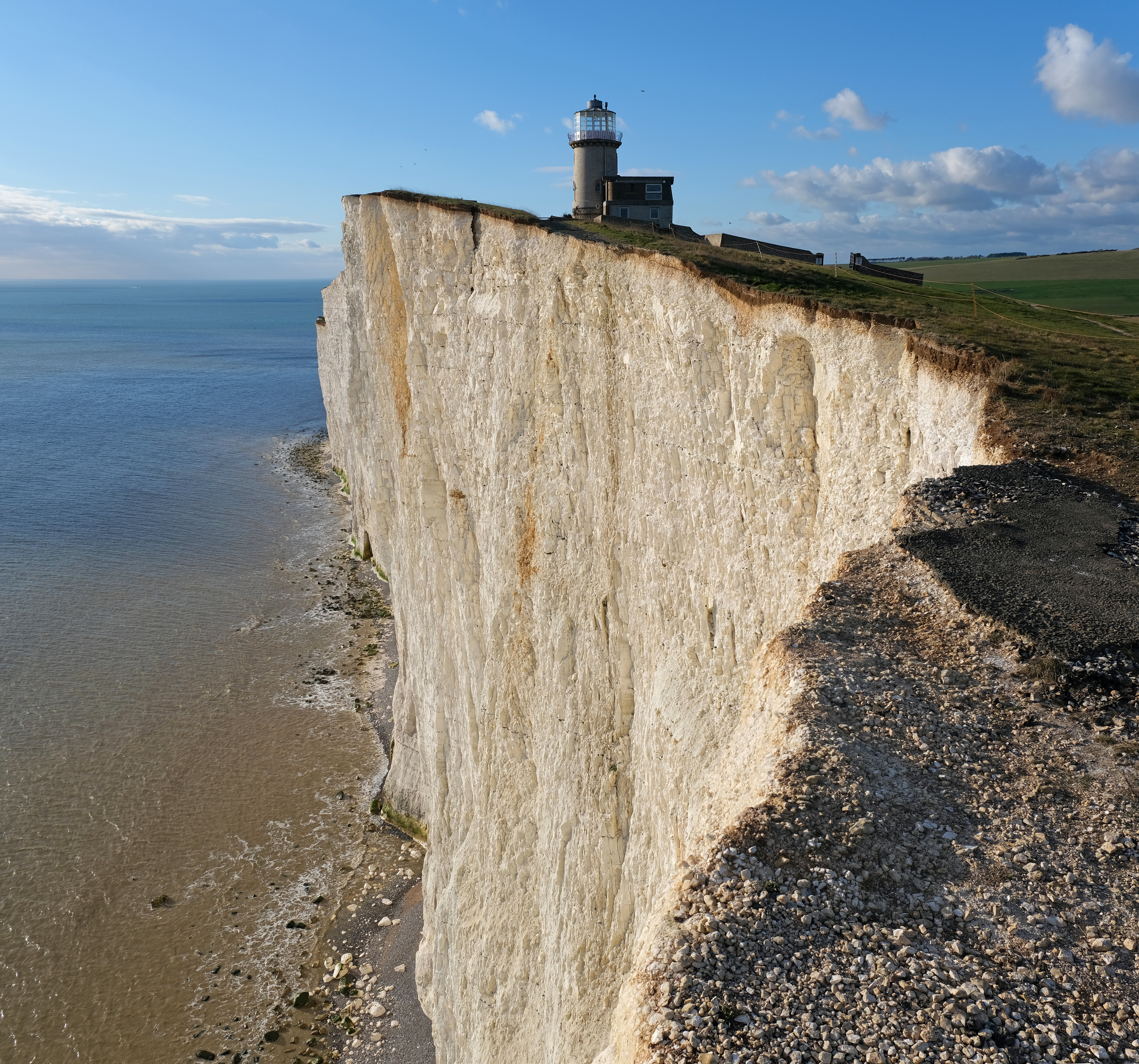
Beachy Head cliffs and Belle Tout Lighthouse

Downland develops when chalk rock becomes exposed at the surface. The chalk slowly erodes to form characteristic rolling hills and valleys. As the Cretaceous chalk layer in southern England is typically tilted, chalk downland hills often have a marked scarp slope on one side, which is very steep, and a much gentler dip slope on the other. Where the downs meet the sea, characteristic white chalk cliffs form, such as the White Cliffs of Dover and Beachy Head.

== Hydrology ==
Chalk deposits are generally very permeable, so the height of the water table in chalk hills rises in winter and falls in summer. This leads to characteristic chalk downland features such as dry valleys or coombes, and seasonally-flowing streams or winterbournes. The practice of extracting water from this aquifer, in order to satisfy the increasing demand for water, may be putting some of these streams under stress.

In the valleys below the downs at the base of the chalk layer, greensand or gault clay comes to the surface and at the interface at the top of the gault a springline can occur where water emerges from the porous chalk or the underlying greensand. Along this line, settlements and farms were often built, as on the higher land no water was available. This is demonstrated very clearly beneath the scarp of the White Horse Hills, above the Vale of White Horse. In many chalk downland areas there is no surface water at all other than artificially created dewponds.

== Soil ==
The soil profile of chalk downland in England is a thin soil overlaying the parent chalk. Weathering of the chalk has created a characteristic soil known as rendzina. Unlike many soils in which there are easily distinguished layers or soil horizons, a chalk rendzina soil consists of only a shallow dark humus rich surface layer which grades through a lighter brown hillwash containing small pellets of chalk, to the white of the chalk itself. This is largely because of the purity of the chalk, which is about 98% calcium carbonate, and the consequent absence of soil-building clay minerals which are abundant, for example, in valley floors.

Steep slopes on chalk downland develop a ribbed pattern of grass covered horizontal steps a foot or two high. Although subsequently emphasised by cattle and sheep walking along them, these terracettes (commonly known as sheep tracks) were formed by the movement of soil downhill, a process known as soil creep.

== Habitat ==
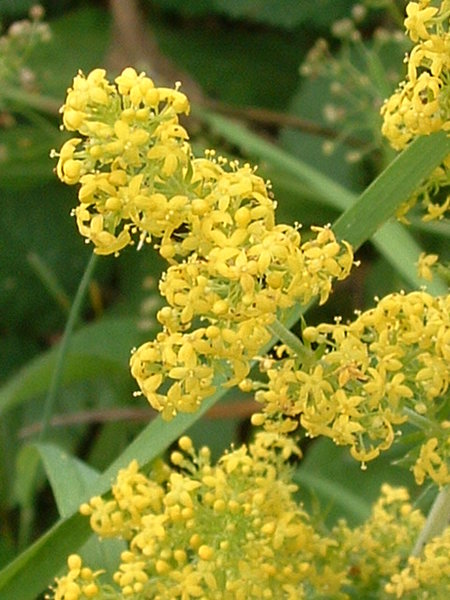
Galium verum (L.), lady's bedstraw, a typical English chalk downland plant

The dominant habitat in chalk downland is typically calcareous grassland, formed by grazing from both livestock and wild animals. Chalk downland is often unsuitable for intensive agriculture, horticulture, or development because of the nutrient-poor, shallow soil and difficult slopes. For this reason downland often survived uncultivated when other, more easily worked land was ploughed or reseeded. This shallow soil structure makes downland ecosystems extremely fragile and easy to destroy. With modern machinery and fertilising techniques, it has become possible to use some previously uncultivated downland for farming, and the decline of extensive grazing has meant that many areas of downland, neither cultivated nor grazed, revert to scrub or other less rare habitat, essentially destroying the delicate calcareous grassland. The UK cover of lowland calcareous grassland has suffered a sharp decline in extent since the middle of the twentieth century. There are no comprehensive figures, but a sample of chalk sites in England surveyed in 1966 and 1980 showed a 20% loss in that period and an assessment of chalk grassland in Dorset found that over 50% had been lost between the mid-1950s and the early 1990s. Much remaining chalk downland has been protected against future development to preserve its unique biodiversity.

== See also ==
- List of downs
- North Wessex Downs
