= Teffont Evias =

Village in Wiltshire, England

Coordinates: 51.0816°N 2.015°W

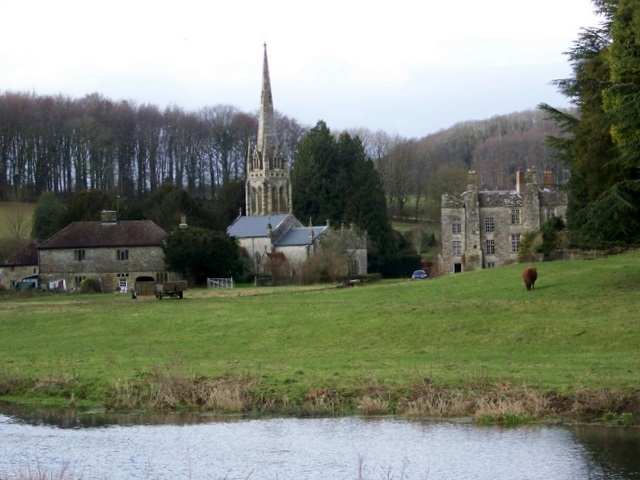

- Location within Wiltshire
- OS grid reference: ST993312
- Civil parish: Teffont
- Unitary authority: Wiltshire
- Ceremonial county: Wiltshire
- Region: South West
- Country: England
- Sovereign state: United Kingdom
- Post town: Salisbury
- Postcode district: SP3
- Dialling code: 01722
- Police: Wiltshire
- Fire: Dorset and Wiltshire
- Ambulance: South Western
- UK Parliament: Salisbury
- Website: www.teffont.com

Teffont Evias is a small village and former civil parish, now in the parish of Teffont, on the Nadder valley in the south of Wiltshire, England. Edric Holmes described the village as "most delightfully situated", and Maurice Hewlett included Teffont in his list of the half dozen most beautiful villages in England. The present buildings are mostly of local stone, and several are thatched.

The civil parish was combined in 1934 with neighbouring Teffont Magna to form a united Teffont parish.

== Location ==
Teffont Evias lies 3 miles (5 km) northeast of the large village of Tisbury and 6 1/2 miles (10 km) west of Wilton. The southern boundary of both the former Teffont Evias parish, and the modern Teffont parish, is the River Nadder. The village street follows the perennial stream, which rises at Spring Head at the north end of Teffont Magna, and flows some 2.5 km south to its debouchement into the River Nadder.

== Geology ==
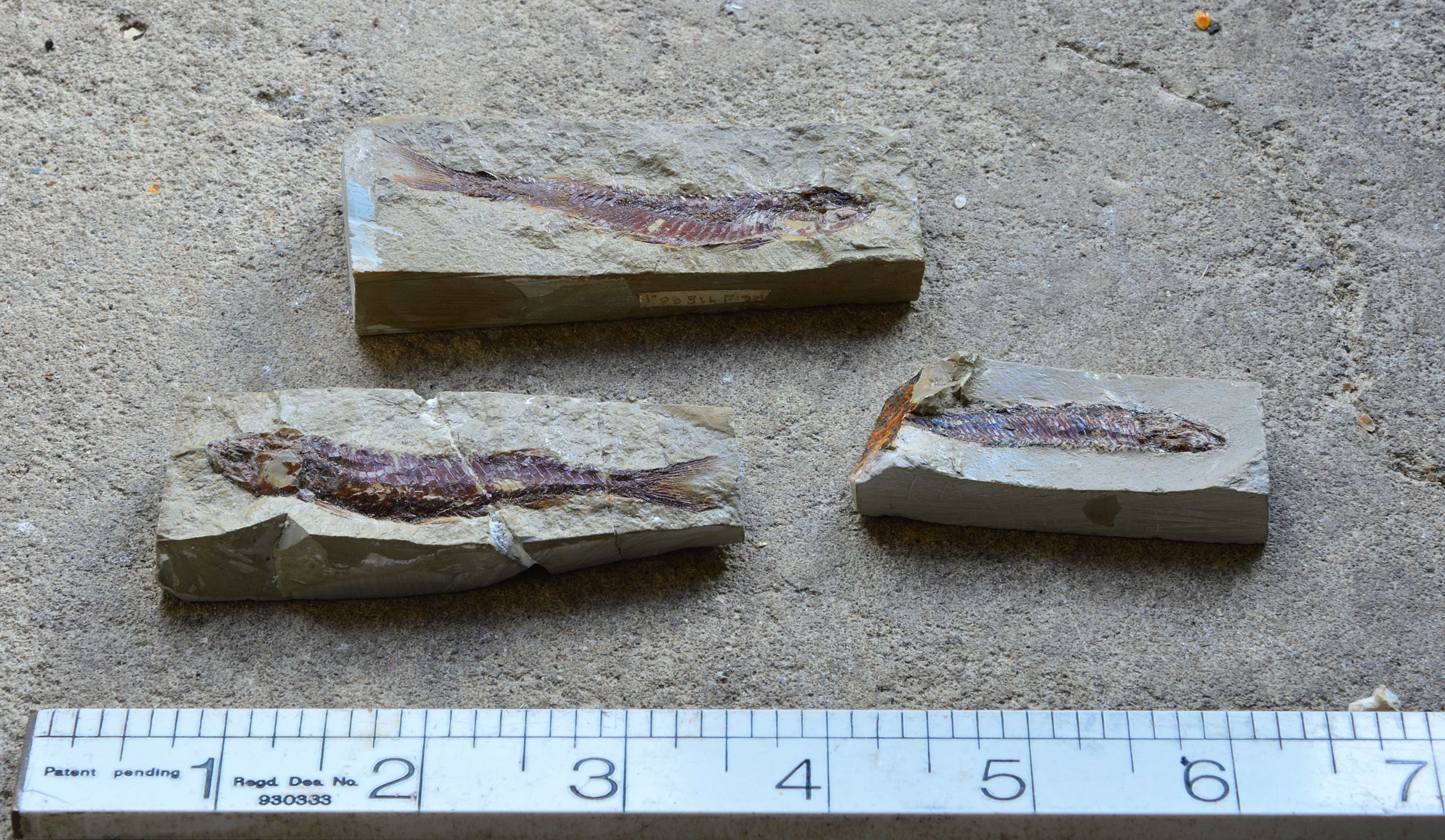
Fossil fish, Purbeck beds, Blackfurlong, DF7 1769

Purbeck limestone underlies almost all of the parish, with a ridge of Cretaceous Upper Greensand. Teffont Evias Quarry and Lane Cutting is protected as a geological Site of Special Scientific Interest, where fossils include some of the best Purbeck fish, with crocodile, turtle, and insect remains. The Chilmark Quarries extend under Teffont and some of the disused entrances are within Teffont parish.

In the 13th century, Teffont Evias's quarries of Purbeck limestone at the southern end of the former parish were the source of much of the freestone used in the building of Salisbury Cathedral.

== History ==
A silver stater of the pre-Roman Durotriges tribe has been found in Teffont which may have been near the boundary of Durotrigian territory.

There is an extensive sacred site and settlement, with much Roman-period material but possibly started well before the Roman arrival, on the ridge to the west of the village.

At least two Roman cists were found in the quarry in Blackfurlong wood, some 200 metres west of the church. Their whereabouts are now unknown.

The modern name derives from "Teo", an old Germanic word meaning a boundary, and the Late Latin word "fontana", meaning a spring of water.

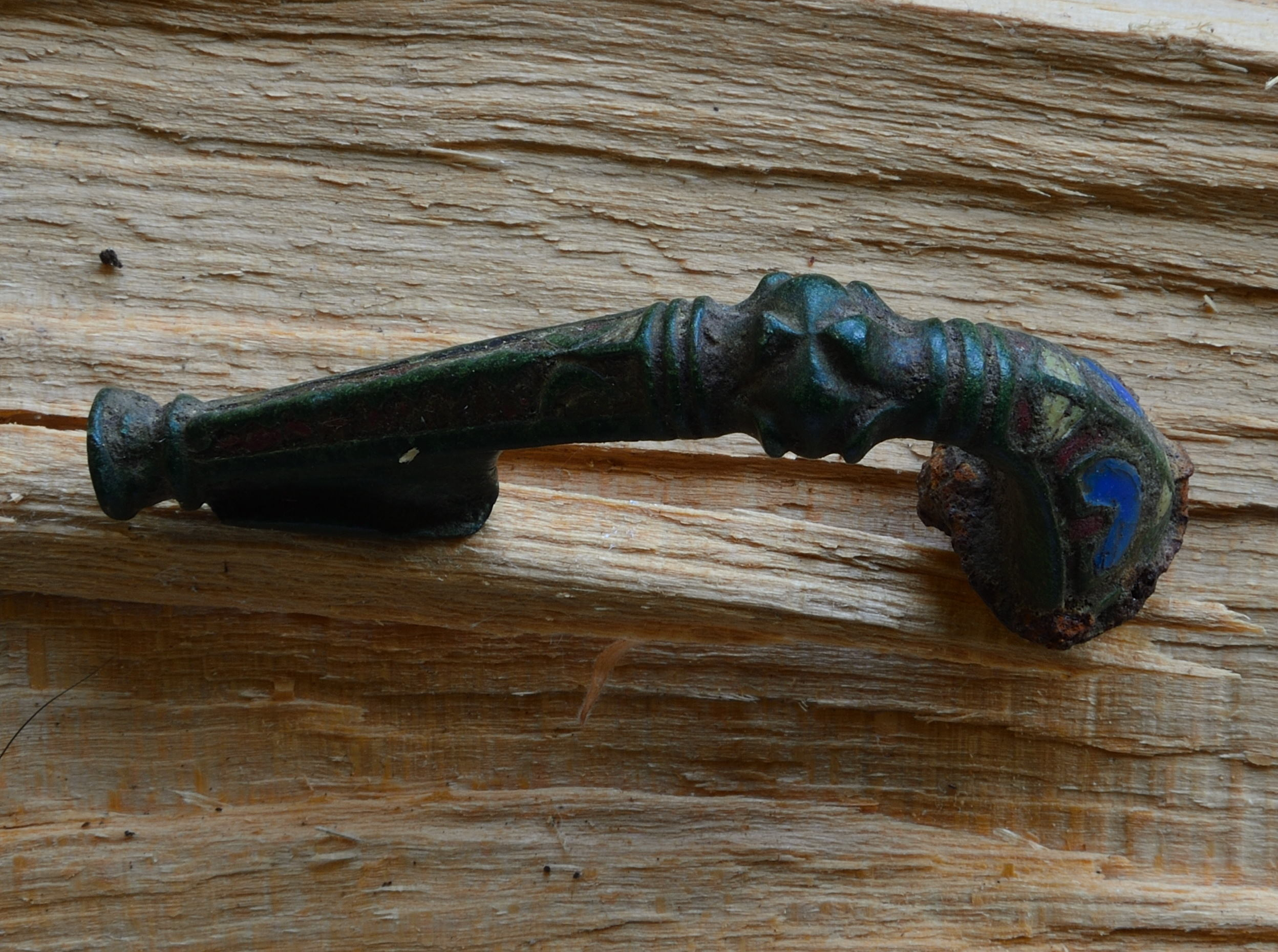
Enamelled Roman trumpet brooch, Upper Holt, Teffont Evias

Early Saxon remains have not been found to the west of the stream, and the original boundary may have separated the Romano-British from the Anglo-Saxons. The "Ewyas" element derives from Ewyas Harold in Herefordshire's Golden Valley, the main seat of Alfred of Marlborough, lord of Tefonte at the time of Domesday Book. From Saxon times the village has been generally on the valley bottom along the course of the stream.

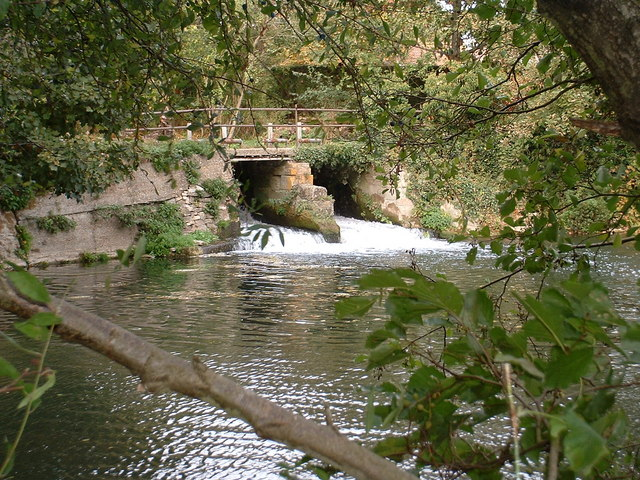
The River Nadder at the site of Teffont Mill

For administration, including punishment of misconduct, the village formed part of Dunworth hundred; in 1502 its tithingman was presented to the hundred court for not carrying a staff as precedent required.

According to Wilson's Imperial Gazetteer of England and Wales (1870–1872):

TEFFONT-EVIAS, a parish in Tisbury district, Wilts; 1¼ mile W of Dinton r. station, and 6½ W of Wilton. It has a post-office, of the name of Teffont, under Salisbury. Acres, 742. Rated property, £1,177. Pop., 163. Houses, 32. The property is all in one estate. The living is a rectory in the diocese of Salisbury. Value, £240.* Patron, W. F. De Salis, Esq. The church is good.

The civil parishes of Teffont Magna and Teffont Evias were combined on 1 April 1934 to form Teffont parish. The population of Teffont Evias in 1931 had been 98.

== Buildings ==
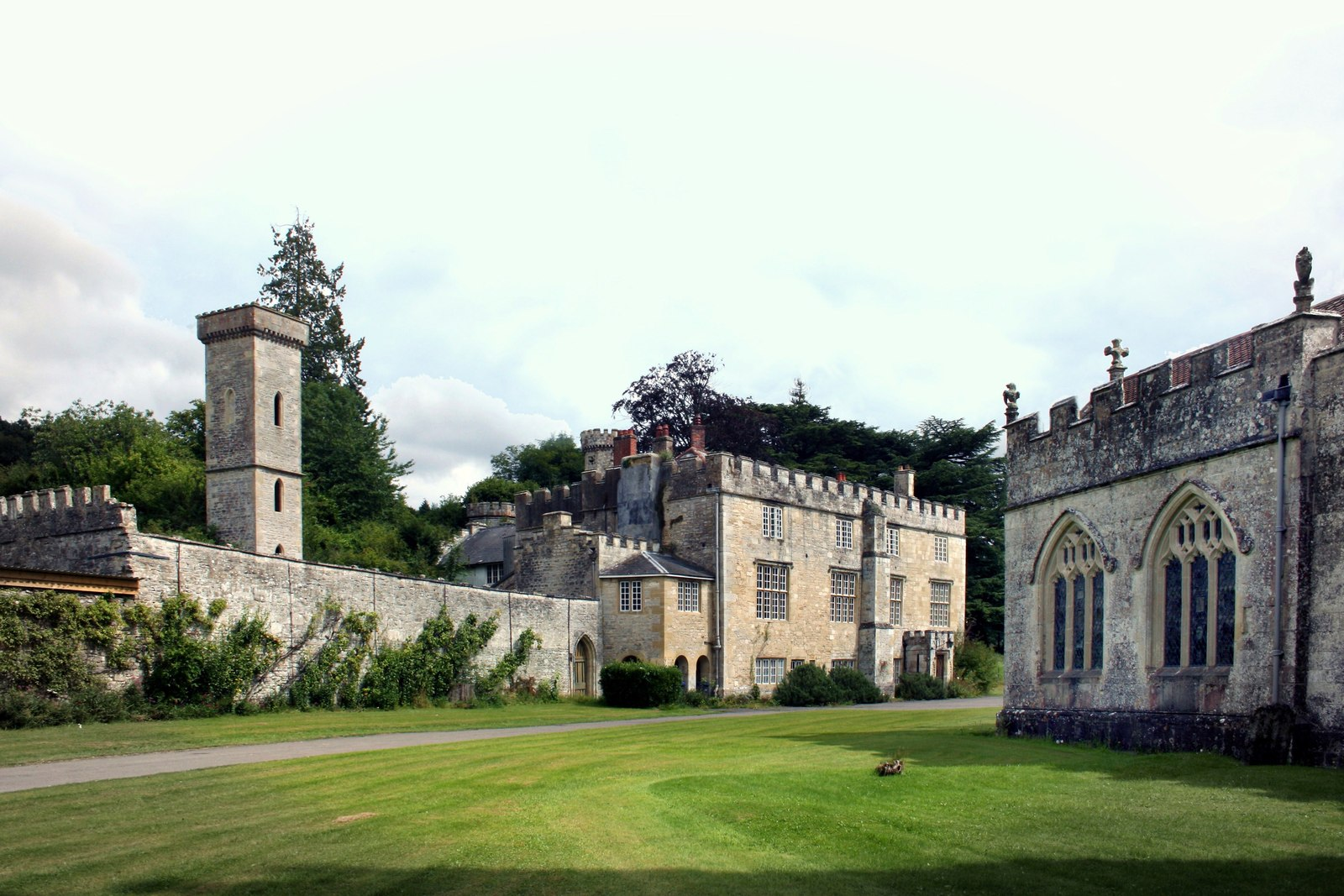
Teffont Manor (left, with water tower) is close to the church (right)

These are scattered along the valley of the south-flowing stream and the road, in irregular clumps giving views of the woods and fields. There are several workers' cottages in vernacular styles, some with carved dates in the 1600s. The house known as Bridges, built in the 18th century and extended and altered in 1842, was the rectory until 1939. William and Emily Fane de Salis paid for the building of a small school in the 1860s (closed in 1876 after Teffont Magna school opened) and opposite it, in 1883, a pair of almshouses that now form Acacia Cottage.

=== Teffont House ===
This Grade II listed dower house links the cottages with the manor house and church. A plaque gives the initials of Augustine E Hayter, and the date 1623. In 1837–8 John Thomas Mayne extended the house and gave it its roof in the style of a Swiss chalet, with wide eaves supported by brackets; it was called the Swiss Cottage until 1947. Mrs Howard ran a guest house there in the 1920s and 1930s, it was a private residence named Howards House until 1969, and a hotel from 1972. In 2026 it reopened as Teffont House Hotel.

=== Manor house ===
The manor house and its adjoining church date largely from the 15th century, with significant embellishments and extensions especially in the 19th century. For two years, about 1839-1840, the Manor house was rented to Grantley Berkeley, who described it as

the best humbug I ever saw: its appearance outside, with its lawn and flower-garden and little lake, overgrown as the house was, with ivy, roses, and jessamine, up to the very chimney-tops, was very pretty; but everything had been sacrificed to external appearance. There was only one bed-room that was comfortable; the dining-room opened into the conservatory; and the drawing-room was so situated that you had to stand on a chair to look out of the window. The dining room ought to have been the drawing-room, but it could not be made into one, on account of the situation of the kitchen. It was a curious house: my study or morning-room was on the lawn, the window opening to the ground; I had to ascend a considerable staircase to the dining-room, though that also opened on the lawn; there was then a tower, up which you went by a very steep ascent of stone steps, and when at the top of the tower you stepped out upon the ground again. The fact was, the house was let into the side of a hill, and you stepped from the roof itself beneath the trees of a fir-plantation.

He also reported that the rest of the village at the time had "no place fit to put a decently-nurtured dog in".

To the east of the manor house a former lodge from early in the 19th century is in rubble stone under a thatched roof.

=== Church ===
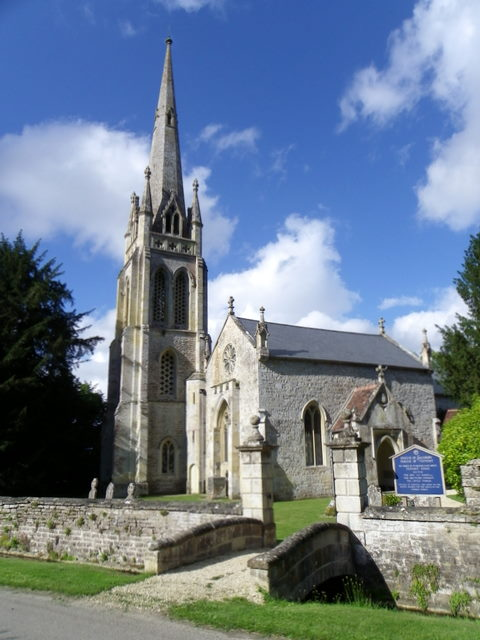
St Michael's Church

The Anglican Church of St Michael and All Angels is Grade II* listed. The present building, in local rubble stone and ashlar with a tiled roof, is largely a rebuilding of 1824–26 to designs of Charles Fowler, at the expense of John Mayne. A church is first mentioned in the 12th century but the structure prior to the rebuilding was from the 16th and 17th; the Ley family's north chapel of 1630 was retained while the chancel and nave were rebuilt with higher walls, a north aisle was added, and the northwest tower was built. The buttressed tower has three stages and a parapet with four spirelets; between 1830 and 1843 a tall recessed spire was added.

Pevsner writes: "It is an impressive steeple, and indeed an impressive church, rising on the lawn of the Manor House".

==== Interior ====
Inside are effigies and tombs of Henry Ley (d. 1574) and his two sons, and an early 19th-century reredos. Sir Walter Raleigh mentions the church of "Tevont Evias" in his Discoverie of Guiana (1596), in connection with the Ley family. Windows have pieces of medieval glass and 17th-century roundels. The three bells were cast in the 17th century. A royal heraldic achievement, dating from 1675, painted on wooden boards, is displayed facing the main entrance.

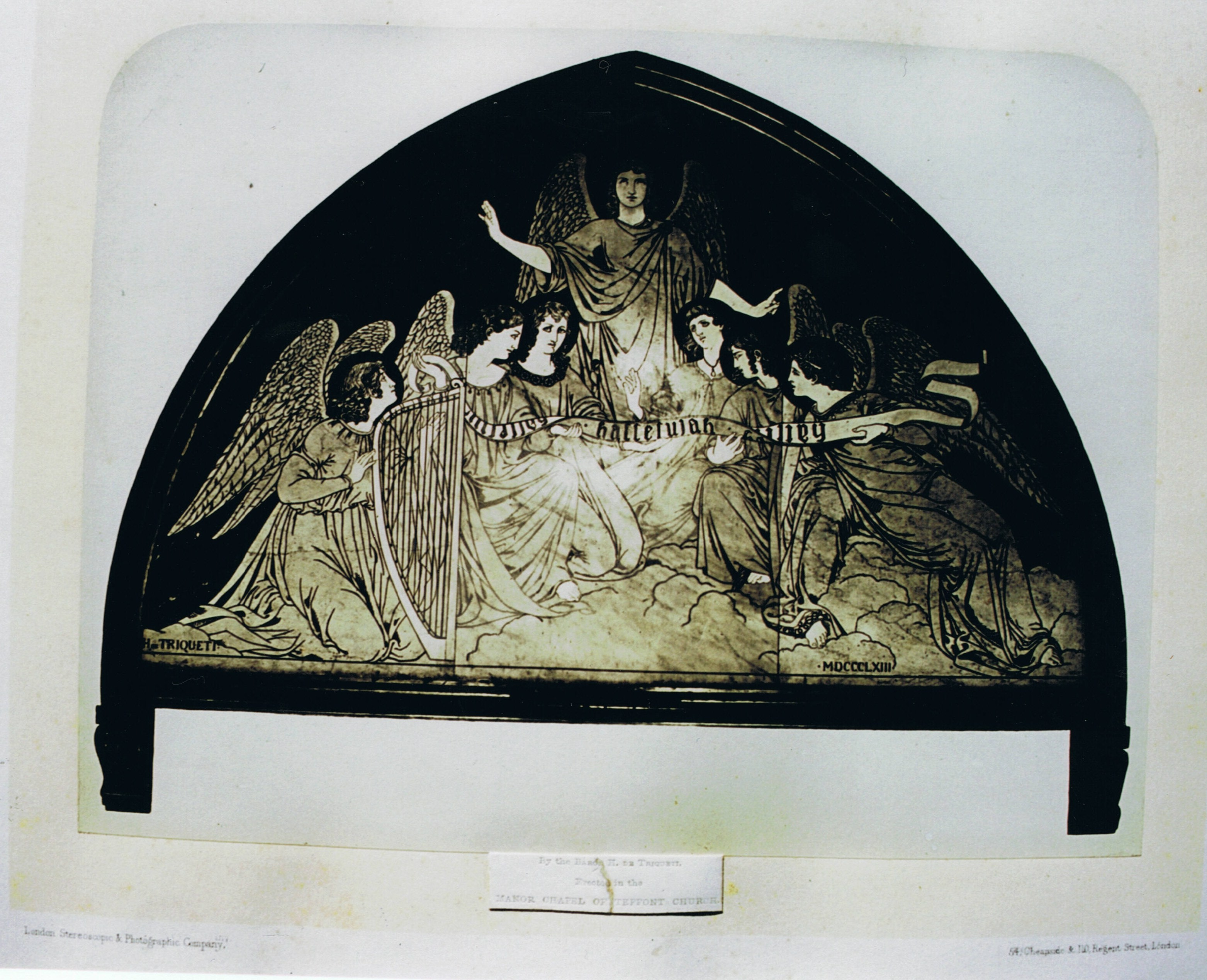
Tarsia panel in the church by Henri de Triqueti dated 1863, photo circa 1870

There is also a marble tarsia panel by Henri de Triqueti, who went on to work in the Albert Memorial Chapel at Windsor Castle. Installed in 1863, the panel was commissioned by Emily Fane de Salis and depicts the choir of angels.

==== Parish ====
The rectory was united in 1922 with the newly created benefice of Teffont Magna (until then a chapelry of Dinton), retaining the rectory house at Teffont Evias. The benefice was held in plurality with Dinton from 1952. In 1979 the benefice became part of a group ministry, today called the Nadder Valley team and covering fourteen parishes with sixteen churches. The church's parish registers survive in the Wiltshire and Swindon History Centre for the following dates: christenings 1684–1991, marriages 1701–1994, and burials 1683–1991.

In 1914, the Reverend Sir Douglas Edward Scott, 7th Baronet, was appointed as the parish's rector. Shortly afterwards he was declared bankrupt and his rectorship terminated; four years later, he was convicted of bigamy and imprisoned.

== Governance ==
Teffont Evias is now part of the parish of Teffont, which has a parish council and is in the area of the Wiltshire Council, a unitary authority which is responsible for almost all significant local government functions. For Westminster elections, it falls within the Salisbury constituency.

== Proprietors of the manor ==
Thomas Hungerford (d.1397) bought a 114-acre estate at Teffont Evias in 1377–8. The estate continued in the Hungerford family but after the attainder in 1461 of Robert Hungerford, 3rd Baron Hungerford it was granted to Richard, Duke of Gloucester, later Richard III. The attainder was reversed in 1485 and the manor was restored to Walter Hungerford of Farleigh (d.1516). His grandson Walter, later 1st Baron Hungerford of Heytesbury, inherited in 1522 but in 1540 he was attainted by an act of Parliament (32 Hen. 8. c. 61 Pr.) and executed for treason, sorcery, and offences forbidden by the Buggery Act 1533 (25 Hen. 8. c. 6), with his estate forfeited to the Crown.

The Crown granted the manor to Henry Ley (d.1574), whose descendant James – created Earl of Marlborough in 1626 – sold it to John Ashe in 1652. In 1665 Ashe made "a pretty vineyard of about six acres" in Teffont. His grandson sold the estate to Christopher Mayne in 1692, and ownership continued in the Mayne family until 1907.

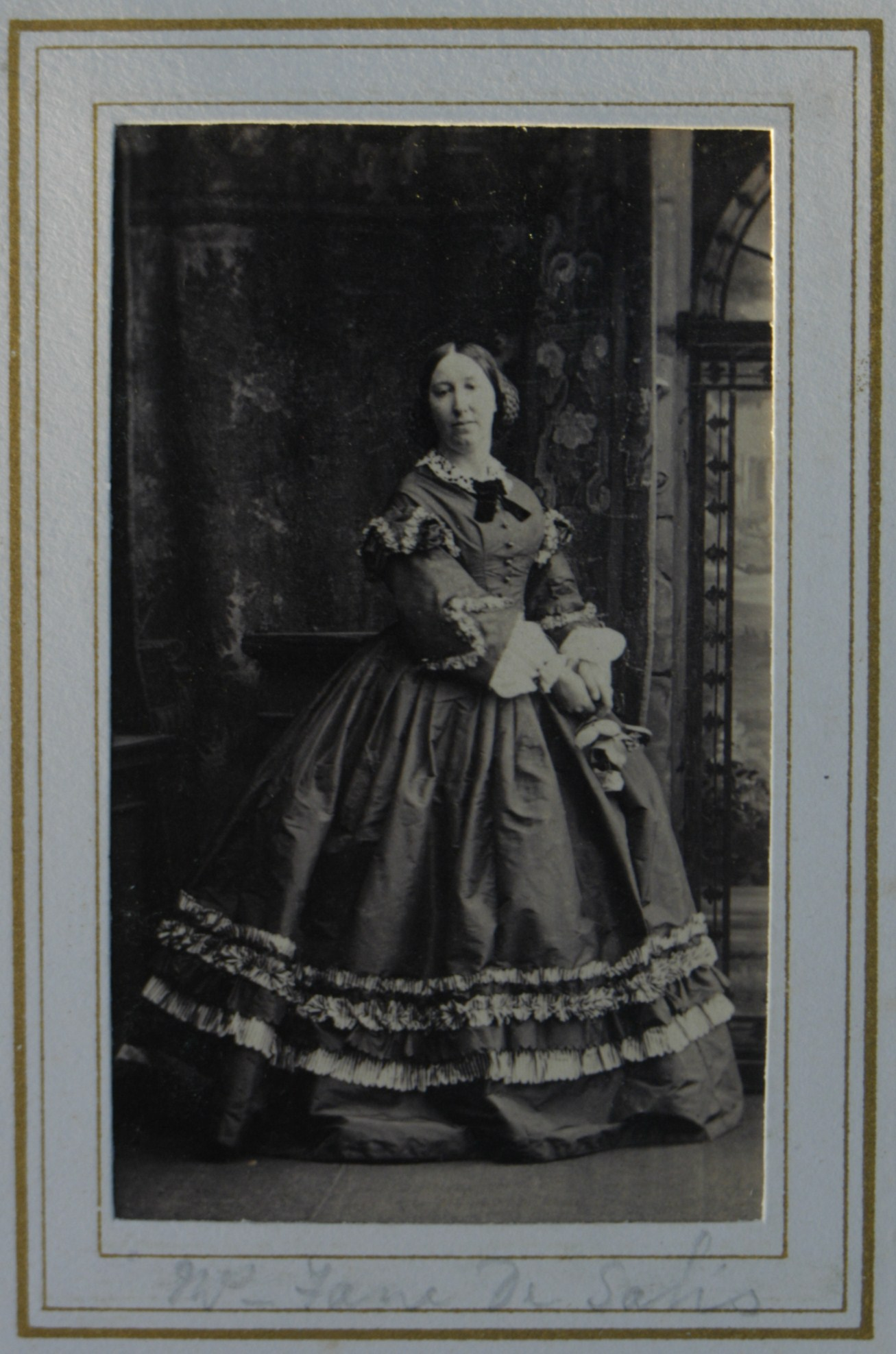
Emily-Harriet Mayne, Mrs Fane de Salis from 1859, eldest daughter of John Thomas Mayne; portrait by Camille Silvy, April 1861

Christopher Mayne (1655–1701), descendant of a prosperous though plebeian Exeter family, bought the manor in 1679 for £12,000 and moved there in 1692. The manor continued in the Mayne family until it was sold in 1802, then was bought back in 1813 by John Thomas Mayne (1792–1843), of the Honourable Society of the Inner Temple. In response to the severe distress of the labouring population and the ensuing riots, he became an "indefatigable reformer" and public speaker, circulating a petition for parliamentary reform and reduced expenditure, which was signed by over 14,000 inhabitants of the county, and presented to Parliament on 10 February 1831. He stood for Parliament in the seat of Totnes, but on 17 Feb 1834 lost to Lord Seymour.

With friends, J. T. Mayne enlarged Teffont Evias church and gave it its present tower and steeple; he also extended and remodelled the manor house, and increased the woodland in the parish. He died in 1843.

From 1852 until her death in 1896, J. T. Mayne's eldest daughter Emily, and her husband William Fane de Salis, were in charge. They built the present service court and water tower of the manor house. Their marriage was childless, so on Emily's death in 1896 the house and estate passed to her next unmarried sister Margaret (d.1905), then to the youngest sister Ellen-Flora (1829–1907), Mrs. Maurice Keatinge, and thence to Ellen's eldest son Richard Keatinge. He sold it to his younger brothers Maurice Walter and Gerald Francis (1872–1965), who shared the advowson of the benefice of Teffont Evias with the patrons of the church of Dinton. Maurice died childless and in 1947 Gerald passed the estate to his son Edgar Keatinge (1905–1998), later Sir Edgar, who had been a Conservative MP for a short time. In 1958 the advowson was transferred to the Bishop of Salisbury.

== Notable people ==
- James Ley, 1st Earl of Marlborough, later Lord High Treasurer of England, was born at Teffont Evias ca. 1552.
- Henry Ley, 2nd Earl of Marlborough, lived at the manor house from 1635.
- William Fane de Salis (1812–1896) married the heiress of the Mayne family and made Teffont Evias his country seat.
- Sir Edgar Keatinge (1905–1998), a former politician, owned and farmed the remainder of the estate from 1947.
- A. W. Andrews (1868–1959) British rock-climber, mountaineer, and amateur tennis and badminton player.
- Marian Andrews (1839–1929), suffragist, biographer and novelist who published under the pseudonym Christopher Hare.
- Paffard Keatinge-Clay (1926–2023), architect and sculptor, was born in Teffont Evias.
- Hermione Baddeley (1906–1986), actress, and her socialite husband David Tennant rented the manor house in 1934 and used it as a venue for boisterous parties (including mixed naked bathing in the goldfish pond).
- Group Captain Frank Willan (1915–1981), RAF officer, later chairman of Wiltshire County Council, lived at Bridges in later life until his death.
