= RAF munitions storage during World War II =

The logistics organisations of the Royal Air Force in World War II were No. 42 Group RAF and RAF Maintenance Command.

== Pre war ==
As a result of a serious shortage of funds during the inter-war period and a weakness of policy, the RAF was singularly ill-equipped to deal with the requirements of air warfare for the protected storage of explosives. In 1936 the RAF had only three ammunition dumps: at Sinderland, Cheshire; Chilmark, Wiltshire; and Pulham St Mary, Norfolk. The latter and former sites' storage consisted of metal sheds connected by standard gauge rail tracks. In 1935 the standard bomb of the RAF was a 250 lb (110 kg) device containing high explosives, the largest bomb being 500 lb (230 kg).

== Development of storage ==
There had been some small-scale use of underground munitions stores in Britain during the First World War, although these were more general purpose than specifically for the RAF. Chislehurst Caves, southeast of London, were bought in October 1914 and a small portion of the twenty miles (32 km) of tunnels was prepared for storing up to 1,000 tons of explosives and raw materials for the Royal Arsenal, Woolwich, nine miles (14 km) away. Similarly, at the Chilwell Ordnance Factory in Nottinghamshire, a nearby hillside was bored out with a T-shaped storage area in 1915 as part of a total £2.5 million spent on the site, but this could hold barely 300 tons of matériel. Other sites were also acquired but with the end of the conflict all fell into disuse.

The Air Ministry estimated in 1936 that a war reserve would contain 98,000 tons of bombs, 82,000 as 250 and 500 lb (110 and 230 kg) bombs and the balance as incendiaries; to save money only 48,000 tons was purchased. The RAF decided to store these weapons in a number of underground depots, each holding 10–30,000 tons. The decision to expend the extra money to store the matérial underground was taken because the thin-walled bombs and inflammable incendiaries were extremely vulnerable to blast, much more so than artillery shells.

The planning of the pre-war storage was finalized in 1938, with three underground depots – one each in northern, central and southern England – each of around 25,000 tons capacity; these served eight surface forward depots, termed Air Ammunition Parks (renamed Forward Ammunition Depots in 1941). Each surface depot would have a capacity of around 1,000 tons and would supply armaments to the individual airfields, being positioned within 25 miles (40 km) of its recipients.

== Underground storage ==
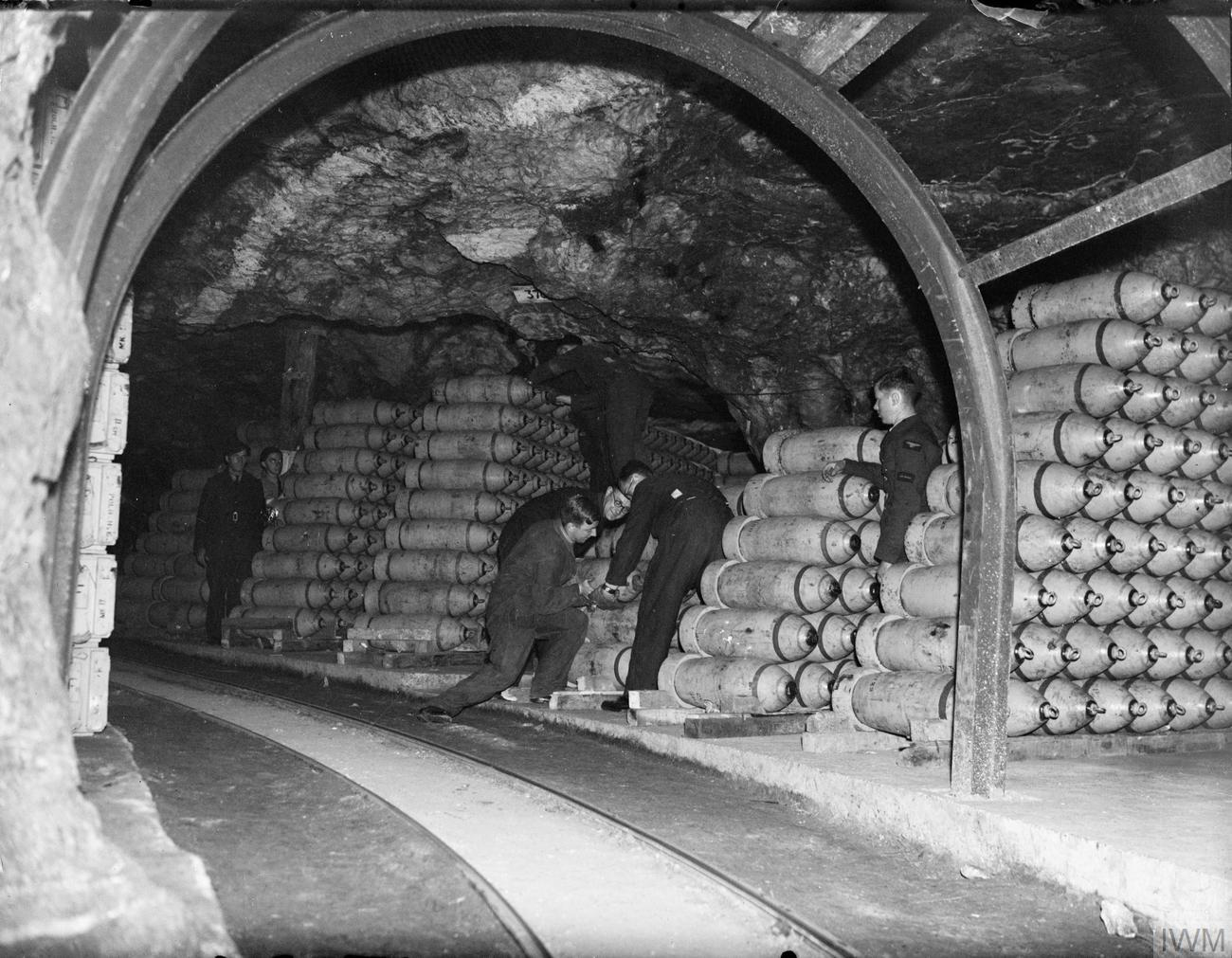
Storemen stack 250-lb medium capacity bombs in one of the tunnels at RAF Fauld.

Over a hundred sites were considered and rejected for the RAF's underground storage; many had been pre-empted by the Army and the War Office. A survey in 1929–30 by the Army had found few sites to be satisfactory with regard to capacity, accessibility, locality and safety. Eventually the Army had a shortlist of five (Chislehurst Caves, certain mines near Blaenau, Scout Quarry in Rossendale, the Meadowbank salt mine in Cheshire, and Ridge Quarry near Corsham, Wiltshire) which was reduced to one: Ridge Quarry. The War Office bought Ridge and the nearby Tunnel and Eastlays quarries in mid-1936 for a little under £50,000. The Army went on to spend £4.4 million to create the Central Ammunition Depot at Corsham.

In the summer of 1936 the RAF acquired a quarry at Chilmark in Wiltshire for its southern depot and an alabaster mine at Fauld in Staffordshire for its northern depot. Making Fauld suitable for use, including surface buildings, cost around £635,000. For the central depot the RAF was forced to create a store: in 1938 it bought a quarry at Harpur Hill in Derbyshire; concrete storage structures were built within the quarry and the hole then backfilled with waste stone. Difficulties with construction and the weather prevented Harpur Hill from opening until mid-1940. An additional pre-war site for underground storage was later created: a slate quarry at Llanberis was turned into another artificial cavern system with a large two-storey structure built for around £500,000 and opened in June 1941. In May 1941 Linley Caverns near Aldridge, Staffordshire was purchased, but, despite having over £1 million spent on it, Linley was never made useful and was relegated to the storage of obsolete munitions when it finally opened, in January 1943.

The poor quality of the RAF stores led to the War Office's providing them with Ridge Quarry, and later part of Eastlays Quarry, at the Central Ammunition Depot. Both were rather poor quality: 96,000 tons of waste stone had to be moved out of Ridge to make it usable and it took over two years to make Eastlays satisfactory for use. The War Office also allowed 4,000 tons of incendiaries to be stored at the nearby Monkton Farleigh Mine.

== Ammunition parks ==
The pre-war Air Ammunition Parks were all constructed to a similar pattern. Close to main railway lines with their own sidings, the sites had one fully enclosed component store, four enclosed stores for incendiaries and usually two groups of paired open-topped concrete storage magazines, each seventy two feet square. All the storage buildings were widely dispersed and had additional shielding with earthworks (termed blast barriers or traverses). Each open magazine was designed to hold 56 tons of bombs. There were additional buildings for the site staff and their needs.

The main Air Ammunition Parks were: RAF Barnham, Suffolk (serving RAF Bomber Command), Brafferton, North Yorkshire (serving 4 Group North), Earsham (serving OTUs), Lords Bridge (serving 2 and 3 Groups), Mawcarse (serving Scotland), Norton Disney (serving 5 Group), Snodland (actually at Halling, serving 11 Group F), Southburn (serving 4 Group South), and Staple Halt (serving 11 Group F). All were completed in 1939–40; Staple Halt was closed in July, 1940 and its role was taken over by Snodland, which was itself replaced by a new park at Newdigate in May 1942. Two more were built during the war: South Witham (serving 1 Group F) was completed in July 1942 and Hockering (2 Group) in January 1943 some five months late. When the USAAF arrived new Forward Ammunition Supply depots were built for its needs at sites including Braybrooke (Northamptonshire), Bures (Suffolk), Melchbourne Park and Sharnbrook (both in Bedfordshire). Where it was rational the USAAF was given sub-sites at existing depots as well.

After the outbreak of hostilities the demands on the Air Ammunition Parks grew far beyond the planned limits. Total site limits were raised from 1,000 tons to 10,000 tons, and the individual stores designed to hold 56 tons of bombs were each, by 1943, holding some 600 tons of matériel. When the parks were renamed Forward Ammunition Depots in 1941 they became central depots with a number of nearby satellite sites, Advanced Ammunition Parks, to increase holding capacity further. Staple Halt became an Advanced Ammunition Park.

The two wartime Forward Ammunition Depots were markedly different from the pre-war designs, relying on concealment by woodland (South Witham was actually within Morkery Woods) rather than toughness. The munitions were held in standard Nissen huts dispersed to increase safety, with transport on standard nine-foot metalled roads. Each had a stated capacity of 8,400 tons of bombs, 840 tons of incendiaries and 40,000 square feet (3,700 m^{2}) for small arms ammunition.

== Satellite sites ==
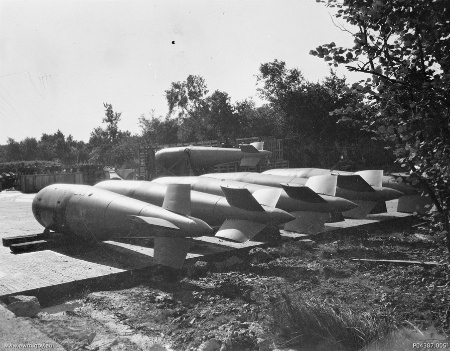
Six Tallboy bombs in a bomb dump at Bardney, Lincolnshire prior to being loaded on No. 9 Squadron RAF aircraft in October or November 1944

The underground depots also gained satellite sites. Chilmark, which as the most southerly store had been often targeted by the Luftwaffe, gained a surface presence of over thirty buildings as well as control over extensive semi-underground sub-sites at Dinton and Groveley Wood, with smaller sub-sites at Hawkinge, Redbrook/Newland, Ruislip and RAF Worthy Down. Fauld had sub-sites at Bagot's Wood, Flax Mill and nearby Hilton; the main site was also expanded.

The depots were in danger of obsolescence for two main reasons. During the war, RAF bombs became much larger: 4,000 lb (1,800 kg) quickly became the new large bomb and the vast production of the older 250 and 500 lb (110 and 230 kg) devices was assigned to long-term storage. This meant the depots had little space to store new, bigger bombs, nor had they the equipment, training or ability to handle larger bombs safely. Secondly, the bases had been located on the assumption that the majority of fighting would be in support of France with active units in the south and east, together with support and training units in the south-west and west. There was no thought that France would collapse in early 1940. The new requirements for RAF fighter and bomber operations from the south-west needed a matching supply structure, which had not been built.

As an example of the pace of change, the 1936 estimate of 98,000 tonnes can be compared to an October 1941 estimated requirement of 632,000 tons within the following year. In 1941 the RAF had a total storage capacity of 158,000 tons. This inadequate capacity was reduced after the depot at Llanberis partially collapsed on 25 January 1942 and the Harpur Hill depot was closed soon afterwards as a precaution against a similar structural failure. A total of 23,906 tons of matériel was removed from these two sites by May 1942. Llanberis was effectively abandoned (decommissioned in 1956, the site would cause problems later when, in 1969, it was discovered that terrorists were exploring the site for explosives) but Harpur Hill was reinforced and re-opened, although the storage of potentially sensitive explosives was prohibited.

There was a hurried examination of even more marginal storage sites, but the situation was overtaken by events. By early 1942 German raids were markedly less threatening than anticipated, thus the need for the additional protection of underground storage was no longer paramount, indeed the sites came to be regarded as expensive white elephants. The method of supply of ammunition was soon changed, with supplies moving directly from the factories to the Forward Ammunition Depots, cutting the underground stores out of the system and relegating them to stores for obsolete stock and chemical weapons, holding points for very large cargoes, and repair centres. Three large new surface sites were established at Gisburn and Wortley in Yorkshire, and Longparish/Harewood Forest in Hampshire. Longparish was designed to hold 40,000 tons of ammunition and the other sites 25,000 tons each.

The collapse of Llanberis also led to the decision to remove chemical weapons from subterranean storage; these were mainly a large number of bombs containing the unstable and corrosive mustard gas. Harpur Hill had been designated the central store for such devices in April 1940, receiving its first load in June of that year of mustard gas bombs evacuated from France. In June 1942 it was decided to move the bombs to a remote site at Bowes Moor in North Yorkshire (now County Durham), beginning in December 1941 with the bombs initially stored in the open under tarpaulins or in wooden sheds. It was found that the sheep on the moorland would consume the tarpaulins and disturb the bombs, resulting in the addition of sheep-proof fences and gates for the entire site. Fifty new buildings were later added to store the larger bombs. To ease distribution of mustard gas, five Forward Filling Stations were built at or near existing bomb storage sites.

Another blow to the underground stores came on 27 November 1944 when there was an explosion at Fauld involving approximately 4,000 tons of high explosive bombs, killing seventy people. The Court of Enquiry concluded that the explosion had been initiated by a mistake in the handling of a damaged bomb by RAF personnel.

== Post World War II ammunition disposal ==
At the end of the war there was, naturally, a sudden and enormous surplus of ammunition. There was little storage difficulty; with no prospect of air attack many of the newly abandoned airfields were turned into open stores for this ammunition prior to its disposal.

Many chemical weapons were disposed of in situ at Maintenance Units but Bowes Moor and Harpur Hill became the centres for destruction. Bulk mustard gas was graded and shipped to Rhydymwyn where any sub-standard product was loaded into 52 gallon drums and dumped either in the Hurd Deep or in Beaufort's Dyke in the Irish Sea. Almost 71,000 bombs containing tabun had been seized in Germany; these were stored in the open at RAF Llandwrog, near Caernarfon, until 1955/56 when, in Operation Sandcastle, they were transported to Cairnryan and scuttled at sea in three ships 120 miles (190 km) north-west of Ireland.
