= Teffont Magna =

Village in Wiltshire, England

Coordinates: 51.090°N 2.017°W

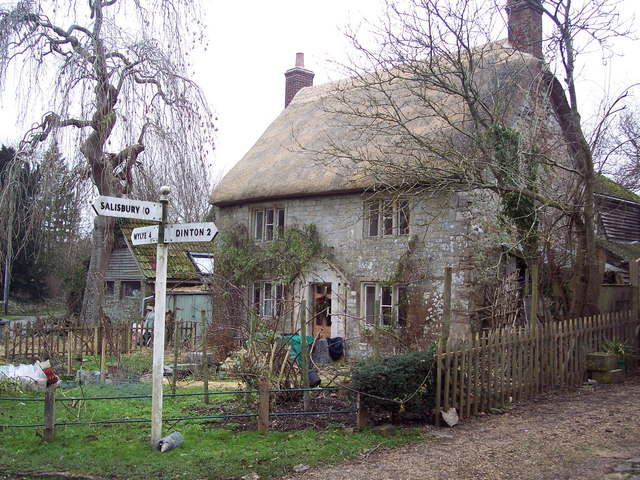
- Signpost and cottage, Teffont Magna

- Location within Wiltshire
- OS grid reference: ST989323
- Civil parish: Teffont
- Unitary authority: Wiltshire
- Ceremonial county: Wiltshire
- Region: South West
- Country: England
- Sovereign state: United Kingdom
- Post town: Salisbury
- Postcode district: SP3
- Dialling code: 01722
- Police: Wiltshire
- Fire: Dorset and Wiltshire
- Ambulance: South Western
- UK Parliament: Salisbury

Teffont Magna, sometimes called Upper Teffont, is a small village and former civil parish, now in the parish of Teffont, in the Nadder valley in the south of the county of Wiltshire, England. For most of its history, Teffont Magna was a chapelry of neighbouring Dinton. In 1934 it was combined with the parish of Teffont Evias, just to the south, to form a united Teffont parish.

== Location ==
Teffont Magna lies 1 1/2 miles (2.4 km) west of Dinton and 7 miles (11 km) west of Wilton. The parish extends north onto the chalk downs that separate the valleys of the Nadder and Wylye.

The village is between Chilmark and Dinton on the B3089 Hindon to Barford St Martin road, in the valley of a stream which rises just to the north and flows south through Teffont Evias to join the Nadder.

== History ==
The north boundary of the ancient parish, and hence also of the modern parish, is a prehistoric linear earthwork called Grim's Ditch. A rapier-shaped bronze dagger has been found in the parish. probably dated between 1400 and 1200 BCE. A hillfort of uncertain age known as Wick Ball Camp stands on a hilltop in the east of the parish, straddling the boundary with Dinton. There is a Roman site southwest of the village.

The 15th-century cartulary of Shaftesbury Abbey includes two charters which refer to land in "Teffont". The first is dated 860, and in it Æthelbald grants fourteen cassati (hides) to a thegn named Osmund. In the second, of 964, King Edgar granted five cassati to the thegn Sigestan. As Shaftesbury Abbey owned the manor of Teffont Magna by the time of the Norman Conquest, the charters may refer to parts of it. There is no mention of Teffont Magna in the Domesday Book, where it may be included under Dinton, another of the Abbey's manors. The ancient parish formed part of the Warminster hundred of Wiltshire.

After the Dissolution, Teffont Magna was acquired with Dinton by William Herbert, who later became Earl of Pembroke. It remained with his successors as Earls of Pembroke until 1919, when it was sold to Lord Bledisloe. In 1950 his younger son, Charles Hiley Bathurst, sold the estate to John Jacob Astor, who a year later broke the estate up by selling it in several lots.

Fitz House, the largest in the village, was built in the mid-17th century in dressed limestone and with mullioned windows; a left wing was added in 1700 and converted from a wool store to living accommodation in the 1920s. Close to the house is a 15th-century thatched barn.

According to Wilson's Imperial Gazetteer of England and Wales (1870–1872):

TEFFONT-MAGNA, a parish in Tisbury district, Wilts; 1¾ mile NW of Dinton r. station. Post town, Teffont, under Salisbury. Acres, 1,440. Rated property, £1,723. Pop., 292. Houses, 63. The property is divided among a few. The living is a p. curacy, annexed to Dinton. The church is tolerable.

A small school was built in the village around the 1870s, and in 1893 the average attendance was 52. After it was closed in 1936, children attended schools in Dinton or Wilton; the building remains in use as the village hall.

The civil parishes of Teffont Magna and Teffont Evias were combined on 1 April 1934 to form Teffont parish. The population of Teffont Magna in 1931 had been 172.

A detailed history of the parish was published in 1965 by the Wiltshire Victoria County History (Volume VIII).

An etching of Teffont Magna by John Piper was released in an edition of seventy prints in 1988.

== Church ==
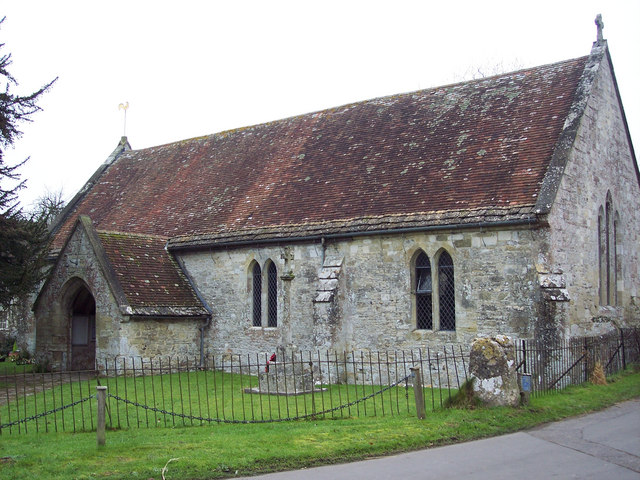
St Edward's Church

The 13th century Church of England church was for much of its existence a chapel of ease of Dinton, and thus escaped Victorian restoration and is substantially original.

In rubble stone with dressed limestone, the building has a simple plan, with a four-bay nave and chancel under one roof; the 14th-century south porch has its original roof timbers. There is no tower, instead a niche in the west gable houses two bells. One of the bells, thought to date from the 13th century, became cracked and was moved into the church in 1930; in 1947 its replacement was installed and the second bell was recast.

Inside are flagstone floors and a wooden chancel screen from the early 16th century. The cylindrical font is from the 12th century, and set into a wall is a fragment of a Saxon cross with fine carving. In 1965 no dedication was recorded for the church, and in that year it was named St Edward's, for Edward the Martyr, king and saint. The church was designated as Grade II* listed in 1966.

As a chapel of ease for St Mary's at Dinton – 1.3 kilometres (0.81 mi) miles away as the crow flies – Teffont Magna was always served by the vicar of Dinton or his curate. In 1922 it was detached from Dinton and united with Teffont Evias to form the parish of Teffont Evias with Teffont Magna. The benefice was held in plurality with Dinton from 1952. In 1979 the benefice became part of a group ministry, today called the Nadder Valley team and covering fourteen parishes with sixteen churches.

The burial ground on the other side of the lane was consecrated in 1925. The parish registers are in the Wiltshire and Swindon History Centre for the following dates: christenings 1852–1991 and marriages 1852–1992. Earlier records are with those of Dinton.

== Governance ==
Teffont Magna is now part of the parish of Teffont, which has a parish council and is in the area of the Wiltshire Council, a unitary authority which is responsible for almost all significant local government functions. For Westminster elections, it falls within the Salisbury constituency.

== Notable people ==
On 25 October 1854, in the Crimean War, Charles Wiltshire Short of Teffont Magna took part in the Charge of the Light Brigade.

In 1856 Harry Fidler was born here to a local farmer, but he took to painting and returned to have a studio here at an old Methodist Church.

In the 1930s, the poet Siegfried Sassoon rented and lived at Fitz House, Teffont Magna. He went to look at it after a friend had written to him of its flagstones, lavender, mullioned windows, orchard and stream.

The explorer Bill Kennedy Shaw lived in the village in the 1930s and 1940s, at his parents' house, King's Orchard.
