= Philipps House =

Country house in Dinton, Wiltshire, England

Coordinates: 51.085°N 1.984°W

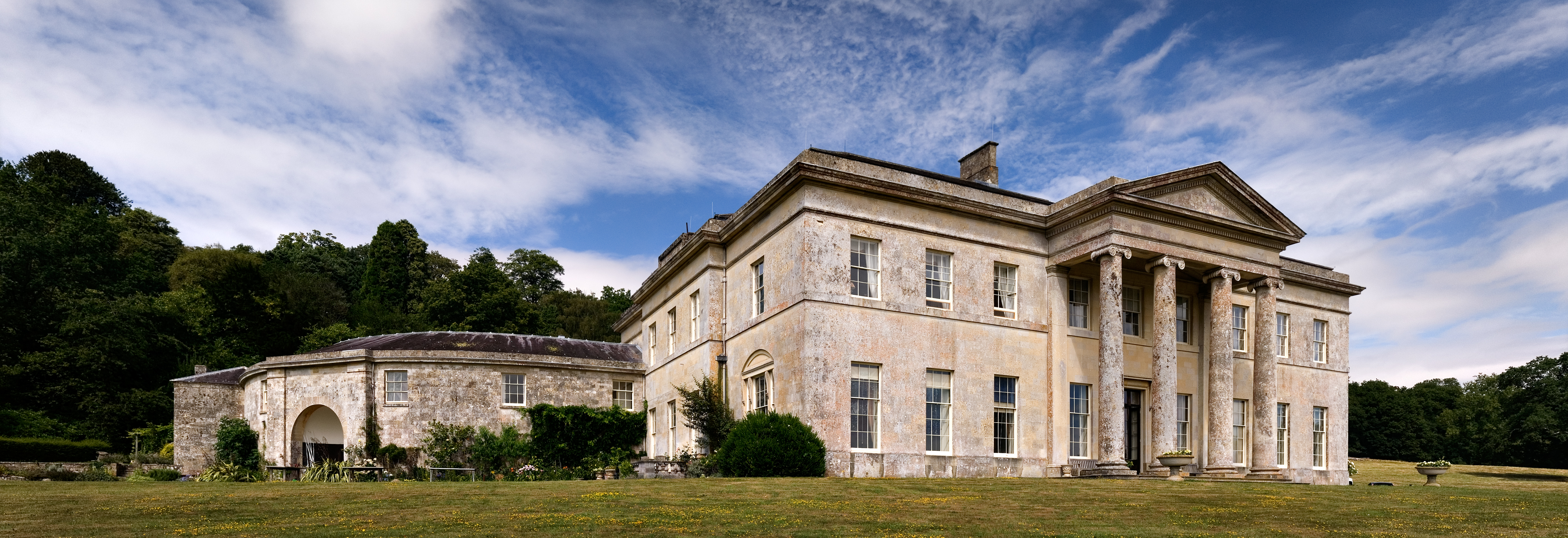
Philipps House

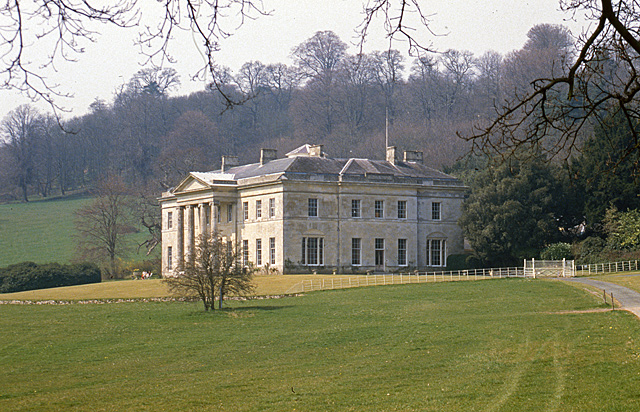
Philipps House

Philipps House (until 1916 Dinton House) is an early 19th-century Neo-Grecian country house at Dinton, overlooking the Nadder valley about 8 miles (13 km) west of Salisbury, Wiltshire, England. The house was built in 1816 by William Wyndham to the designs of Sir Jeffry Wyatville, replacing a 17th-century house. In 1916 the estate was bought by Bertram Philipps, who renamed the house after himself, then in 1943 gave the house and grounds to the National Trust. The is Grade II* listed and its parkland (known as Dinton Park is Grade II* on the Register of Historic Parks and Gardens.

The house is built of Chilmark stone, a local stone also used for Salisbury Cathedral, and Wyatt is believed to have based his design on Pythouse, some seven miles (11 km) away at Newtown, near Tisbury. The house is two-storied with symmetrically set chimney stacks and a central lantern. The main (south) front has nine bays with an Ionic portico. The rooms are planned around a spacious square hall with an imperial staircase to the first floor. The house is one of the first in England to have a central heating system installed, which was achieved by pumping hot air from a boiler in the basement into the stairwell.

== History ==
The house was designed by Jeffry Wyatt, later Sir Jeffry Wyatville for William Wyndham (1769–1841), a descendant of Sir Wadham Wyndam, and was built between 1814 and 1817 on the site of an earlier, demolished seventeenth-century house, Dinton House, which had been the Wyndham family home since 1689. It was sold in 1916 by William Wyndham (1868–1951) of Orchard Wyndham in Somerset, whose father William VI Wyndham (1834–1914), of Dinton House, had inherited Orchard Wyndham as heir male to his grandfather William IV Wyndham (1769–1841), of Dinton, under the will of his distant cousin George Wyndham, 4th Earl of Egremont (1786–1845) (who shared common descent from Sir John Wyndham (1558-1645) of Orchard Wyndham).

In 1917 foreclosure proceedings were brought against Dinton House and its estate. The estate was bought by Bertram Erasmus Philipps (1870–1947), a descendant of the Philipps baronets of Picton Castle (1621 creation); who renamed the house after himself. He was High Sheriff of Wiltshire in 1923. Philipps and his wife, who had no children, annually hosted the pupils from the village school for a tea party at Philipps House with sports and fireworks.

In 1936, Philipps leased the house to the YWCA and moved to nearby Hyde's House, a former rectory which he had bought in 1924 and where he lived until his death. During World War II, the park in front of Philipps House was requisitioned for use by the United States Army Air Force, who erected a number of Nissen huts there. In 1943 Philipps gave the house and 250 acres (1.0 km^{2}) of parkland to the National Trust, along with Hyde's House as well as a number of paintings owned by the Wyndham and Philipps families.

== National Trust ==
Although the house and estate became the property of the National Trust, the property was handed over on the condition that it would continue to be leased to the YWCA, on a peppercorn rent, for as long as they had use for it. During their occupation the house was predominantly used as an artists' retreat, providing residential art courses for amateur and semi-professional painters.

The interior spaces were converted into artist studios with bedrooms available for paying guests. The grounds and outlying area also provided locations for landscape painting.

The YWCA remained at Philipps House until 1995. Despite the art courses being as heavily subscribed to as ever, the withdrawal of the YWCA was inevitable after the terms of the lease were changed when it was presented to the YWCA for renewal, a process that occurred every ten years. The lease transferred the cost of maintaining the structure of the house and other amenities from the National Trust to the YWCA at a time when many major works were due, such as laying new pipes from the neighbouring village of Dinton.

After the YWCA left, the National Trust carried out a refurbishment of the house, which was leased to a tenant family. As of July 2026, the house remains closed to the public. The parkland that surrounds the house is still known as Dinton Park, and is accessible to the public.

== Bibliography ==
- Anon, 1954, Philipps House, Dinton, Wiltshire: A Property of the National Trust, Curwen Press for the National Trust, 6 pages
- James Lees-Milne, 1943, "Dinton House" Country Life 17 December 1943
- Pevsner, Nikolaus; Cherry, Bridget (revision) (1975) [1963]. Wiltshire. The Buildings of England (2nd ed.). Harmondsworth: Penguin Books. p. 219. ISBN 978-0-14-0710-26-7.
