= Chilmark =

Chilmark may refer to:

- Chilmark, Wiltshire, a village in England
  - Chilmark Quarries, a Site of Special Scientific Interest south of this village
  - RAF Chilmark
- Chilmark, Massachusetts, United States, a town on the island of Martha's Vineyard
