= Pythouse =

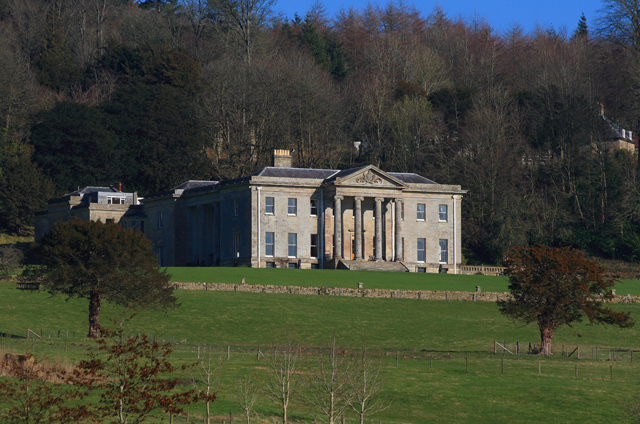

- Location within Wiltshire

General information
- Location: near Tisbury, Wiltshire, England
- Coordinates: 51.0563°N 2.1348°W

Pythouse, sometimes spelled Pyt House and pronounced pit-house, is a country house in southwest Wiltshire, in the west of England. It is about 2 1/2 miles (4.0 km) west of the village of Tisbury.

Described as a "fine classical house", Pythouse is set in parkland with a ha-ha separating the formal house lawn from surrounding parkland on which livestock may graze.

It has an Ionic portico, and the front elevation may have inspired the design of Philipps House at nearby Dinton, which was begun in 1813 and designed by Sir Jeffry Wyatville.

Leigh Court in Somerset was later built to the plans used for Pythouse.

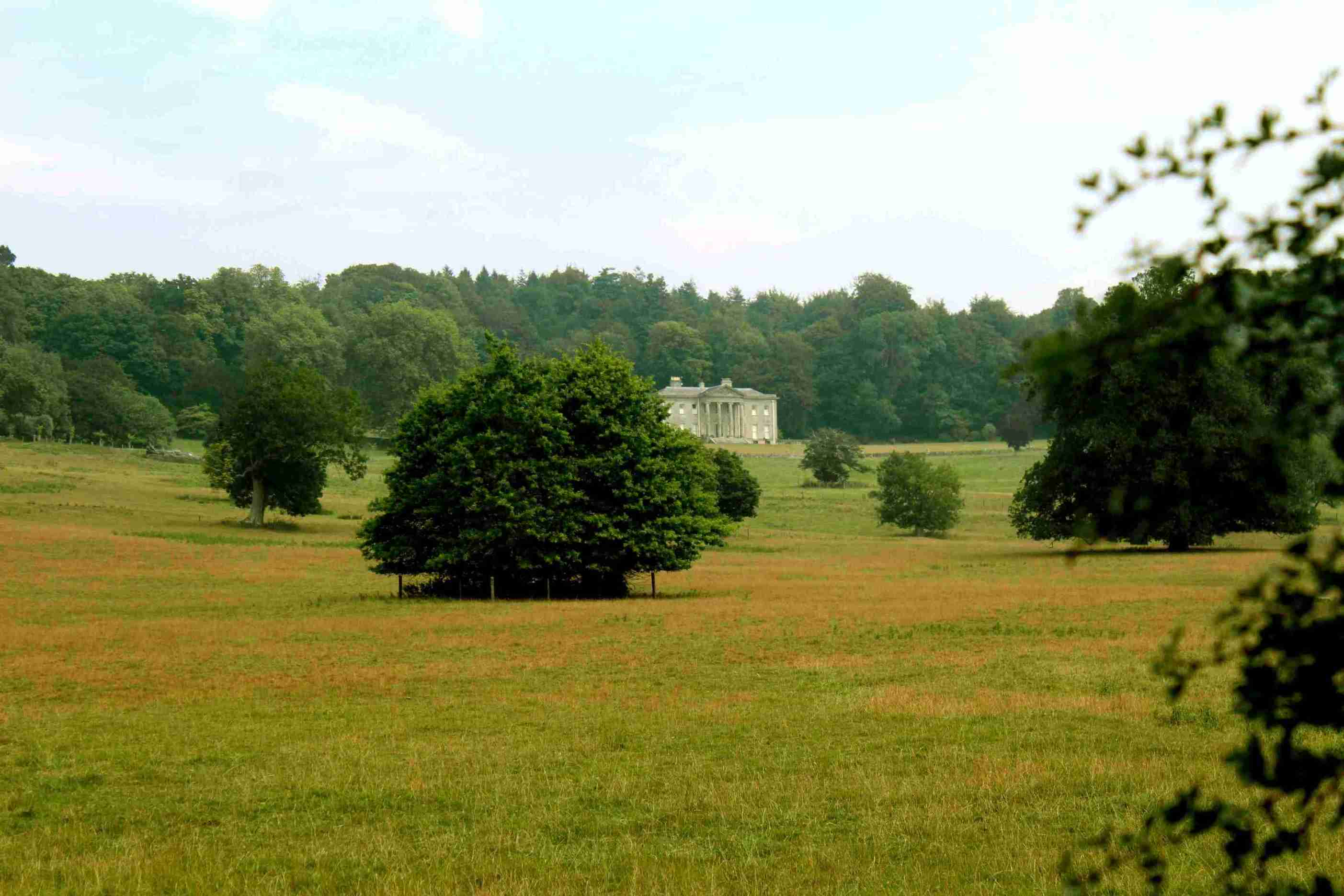
House and parkland, from the road to the south

== History ==
In about 1225 the land was given to the Pyt family (pronounced pit) by the abbess of Shaftesbury.

Until about 1651 the Pyts lived on the estate, until they were forced to sell in order to pay fines levied against them by Parliament following the Civil War, as they had supported the Royalists in the war. At this time the family name had been changed to Bennett, maybe as homage to the Benedictine Abbey of Shaftesbury.

After the Civil war, the house was bought by the Grove family, friends of the Pyt/Bennett family. In about 1707 the Groves sold it to the Benett family, who were related to the original Bennetts by marriage.

About 1725 the current Pythouse was built, replacing an earlier Elizabethan house.

In 1805 the house was altered by John Benett (1773–1852), the owner and amateur architect, who "Palladianized" it with the help of architect Thomas Hopper. In 1891, rear service wings were added.

== 20th and 21st centuries ==
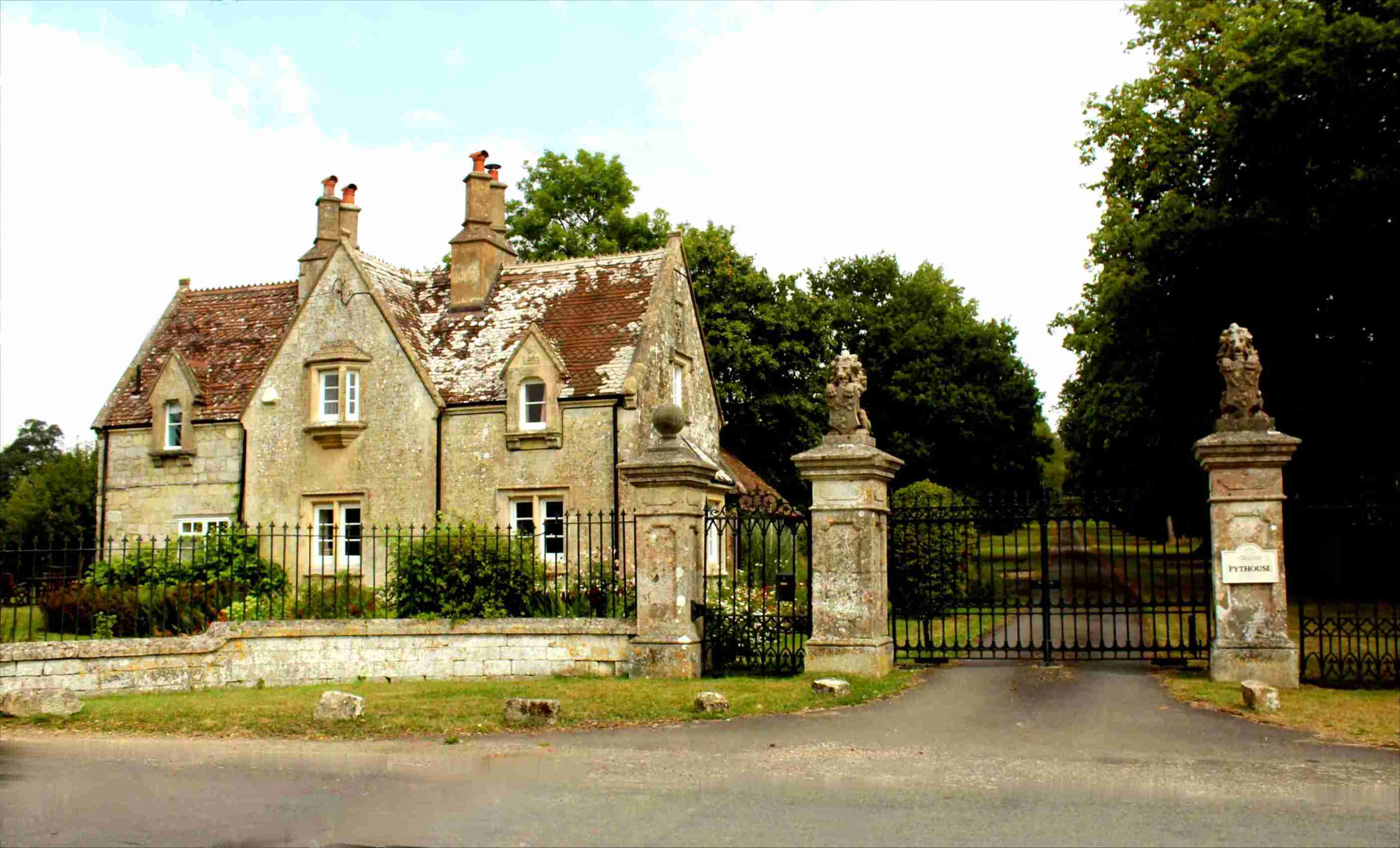
Estate entrance with lion statues on top of gateposts

The house remained in the Benett family until the mid-1950s, when death duties forced its sale.

The house was then owned for 46 years by the Country Houses Association, a charity which ran it as a retirement home.

In 1966 the 38,681 sq ft (3,593.6 m^{2}) house was designated as Grade II* listed and in 1990 the small chapel in the grounds, built around 1827 by John Benett, received the same designation.

In 2004 Pythouse (together with 95 acres (380,000 m^{2}) of land) was sold for £7 million and is once more a private home.

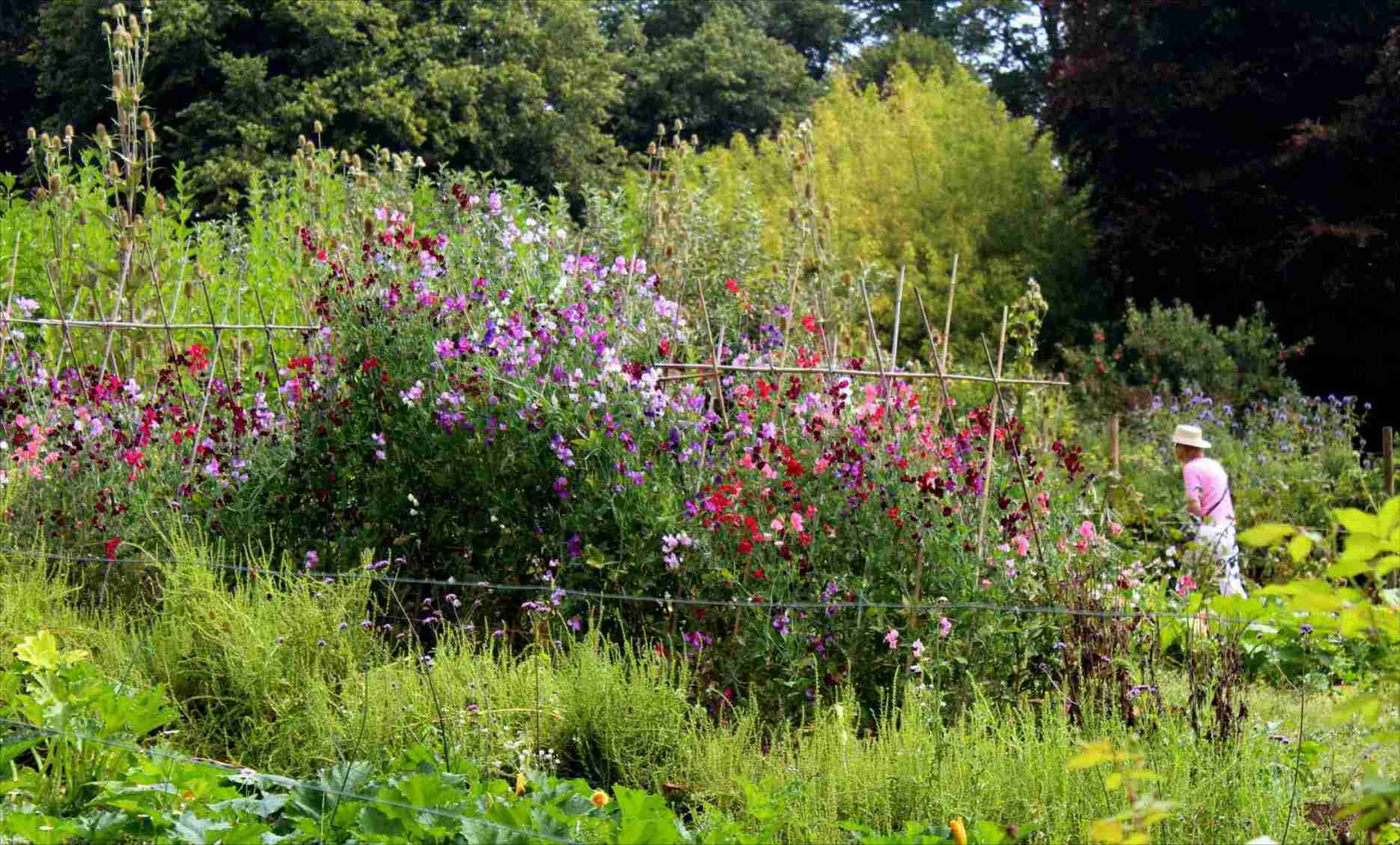
Part of Pythouse kitchen garden, south-east of the main house

The House and estate is not open to the public, but to the SE of the House is Pythouse Kitchen Garden with public access to a 3-acre walled garden with parking, restaurant, bar, and an area with plants producing vegetables and fruit for the restaurant.

The estate was listed for sale with Knight Frank in June 2023 for an asking price of £18,000,000.

== Bibliography ==
- John Eyre (2002). Pythouse and the Benetts. Country Houses Association. ISBN 9780954545208.
- Pevsner, Nikolaus; Cherry, Bridget (revision) (1975) [1963]. Wiltshire. The Buildings of England (2nd ed.). Harmondsworth: Penguin Books. pp. 356–357. ISBN 978-0-14-0710-26-7.
- John Martin Robinson, 2005, "Pythouse, Wiltshire" Country Life 199:1, 36-41
