= Lower Coombe and Ferne Brook Meadows =

Site of Special Scientific Interest in Wiltshire, England

Coordinates: 51.01172°N 2.12111°W

Lower Coombe and Ferne Brook Meadows (grid reference ST916236) is an 11.34 hectare biological Site of Special Scientific Interest in Wiltshire, England which sits on the Upper Greensand and Gault Clay. The site is home to rare fen meadow and neutral grassland communities in an unimproved grassland. Species such as Triglochin palustris, Caltha palustris and Oenanthe pimpinelloides can be found at the location. Three streams, which form headwaters of the River Nadder flow through the site. It was notified in 2002.
