= Teffont =

Civil parish in Wiltshire, England

Coordinates: 51.085°N 2.016°W

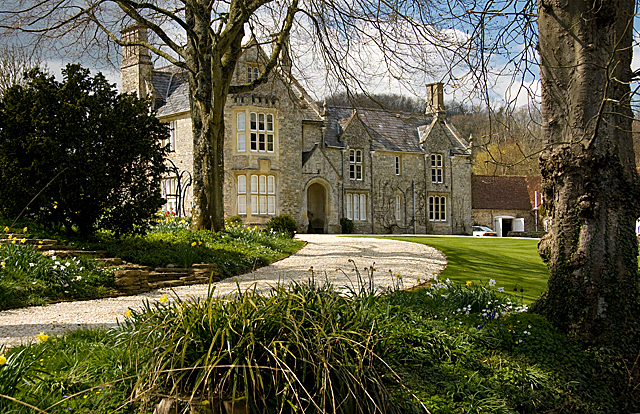
- Bridges, Teffont Evias

- Location within Wiltshire
- Population: 248 (in 2011)
- OS grid reference: ST990317
- Unitary authority: Wiltshire
- Ceremonial county: Wiltshire
- Region: South West
- Country: England
- Sovereign state: United Kingdom
- Post town: Salisbury
- Postcode district: SP3
- Police: Wiltshire
- Fire: Dorset and Wiltshire
- Ambulance: South Western
- UK Parliament: Salisbury
- Website: www.teffont.com

Teffont is a civil parish in the south of Wiltshire, England, consisting of the villages of Teffont Magna and Teffont Evias. It is in the Nadder valley, north of the river, about 10 miles (16 km) west of Salisbury. The parish was created in 1934 by combining the two Teffonts. The population taken at the 2011 census was 248.

== Description ==
Teffont has a parish council and is in the area of the Wiltshire Council, a unitary authority which is responsible for almost all significant local government functions.

The two former parishes each had a church, and both continue in use, although they are only about three-quarters of a mile apart; they are both Grade II* listed buildings. Until 1922 Teffont Magna was a chapelry of Dinton, and its modest church dates from the 13th century. The church at Teffont Evias was rebuilt in the 1820s, when an imposing tower was added.

Part of Chilmark Quarries, a former stone quarry and now a Site of Special Scientific Interest, is in the far southwest of the parish.

== Roman sacred site ==
The modern village is within the valley of a perennial spring at the north end of the village. A greensand ridge overlooks the valley from the west, and here the Teffont Archaeology Project has since 2008 investigated the site of a large Roman-period temple complex. The area crosses the boundary of the two Teffonts. This sacred landscape may have marked the western edge of the territory of the Durotriges, whose coins have been found in Teffont.

== Post-Roman status ==
The name Teffont has an Old English element (*tēo, boundary), though it has also been said to derive from an unattested personal name *Teōwa. The second element is from Latin (*funta, from fontāna, spring). *Funta sites usually lay between areas occupied by Britons and the recently-occupied territories of incoming Anglo-Saxons, and the name may have been applied to a spring where people met to agree boundaries. "Funta" and other Latin and British place-name elements in this area of south-west Wiltshire suggest that Brittonic speech may have survived in the area to a late date.

Teffont may have continued to mark a boundary, this time between British and Saxons, for decades after the departure of Roman authority and the fall of the neighbouring civitas Belgarum to the Saxons. To the east there are many sixth-century Saxon cemeteries, but to the west the graves all belong to the second quarter of the seventh century and are of a different character, with weapons and other grave goods which may make a political statement following the conquest of new territory.

== Later Saxon history ==
In 860 Æthelbald, King of Wessex granted 14 hides at Teffont to his thegn, Osmund.
