= Harry Fidler =

English painter

- Born: 1856; Teffont Magna, Wiltshire
- Died: 1935 (aged 78–79); Stoke, Hampshire
- Known for: impressionist paintings of farm animals
- Partner: Laura Clunas

Harry Fidler (1856–1935) was a British painter known for including farm animals and especially horses in his impressionistic paintings, typically using heavy impasto. He married Laura Clunas (d. 1936), who was an artist with a similar style.

== Life ==
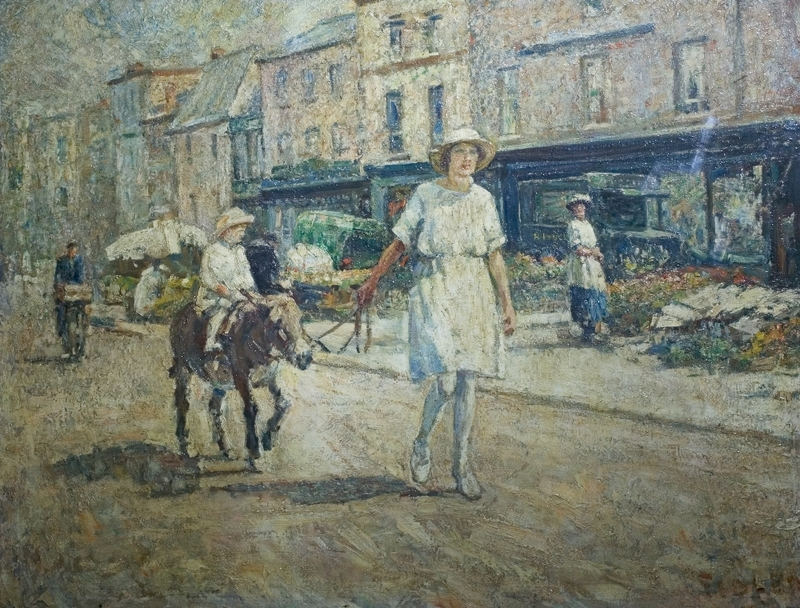
A Lucky Boy, Derby Museum and Art Gallery

Fidler was born to a farming career in Wiltshire in 1856, in Teffont Magna. He did not train as an artist until his early thirties. He was the ninth of ten children with a number of artistically gifted siblings. Fidler attended Herkomer's School at Bushey which was a Hertfordshire school later well known for animal painting. Herkomer boasted of the wide variety of styles of his students who were encouraged to paint from life and ignore intellectual art theories. His students included William Nicholson and Lucy Kemp-Welch.

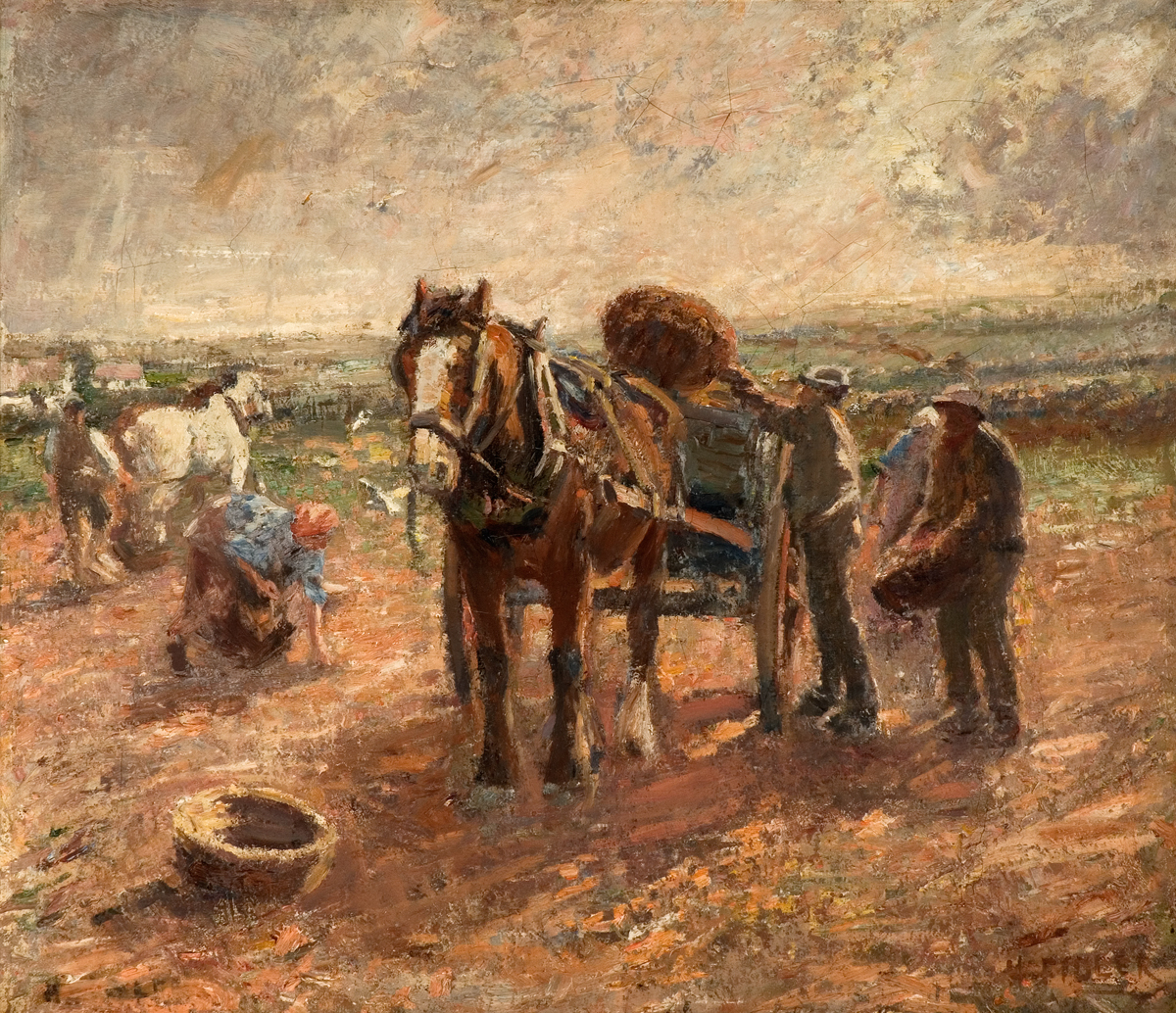
"Clearing the Potato Field" at the Potteries Museum & Art Gallery

On a second visit to Bushey in 1898, Fidler met and married Laura Clunas. (according to another source they did not marry until 1918). Fidler had a studio in an old Methodist Chapel in Teffont Magna and their first home was in Salisbury. He and his wife visited the Art Society in St Ives, Fidler painted there and they may have been members.

Fidler frequently included farm animals and especially working horses in his paintings with a heavy style. He frequently used poor quality canvas and inadequate ground which means that his work can require early restoration. He joined the Royal Institute of Oil Painters and the Royal Society of British Artists. He successfully exhibited several large canvases at the Royal Academy.

Fidler died at Stoke near Andover in 1935. He has paintings in several public collections including Derby Museum, the Potteries Museum & Art Gallery, Watford Museum, the Smith Art Gallery at Brighouse and the Grundy Art Gallery in Blackpool. Harry and his wife Laura have paintings at Cartwright Hall, the art gallery in Bradford. Laura Fidler died in 1936 and her work has on occasion been wrongly attributed to her husband.
