= Chilmark, Wiltshire =

Village in Wiltshire, England

Coordinates: 51.094°N 2.045°W

Chilmark
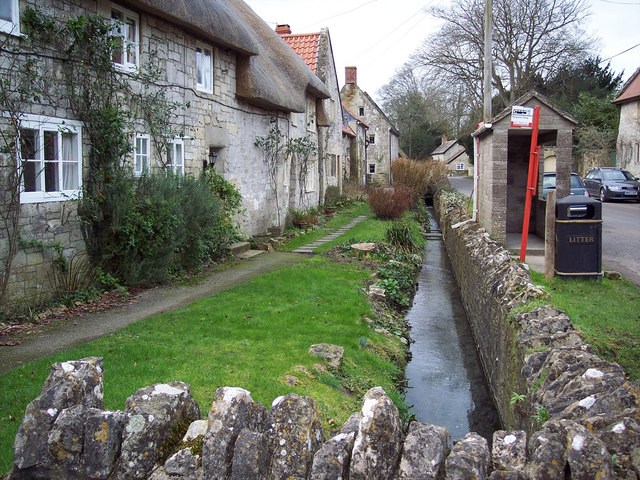

- Location within Wiltshire
- Population: 525 (in 2011)
- OS grid reference: ST969327
- Unitary authority: Wiltshire
- Ceremonial county: Wiltshire
- Region: South West
- Country: England
- Sovereign state: United Kingdom
- Post town: Salisbury
- Postcode district: SP3
- Dialling code: 01722
- Police: Wiltshire
- Fire: Dorset and Wiltshire
- Ambulance: South Western
- UK Parliament: Salisbury
- Website: Parish Council

Chilmark is a Wiltshire village and civil parish of some 150 houses straddling the B3089 road, 11 miles (18 km) west of Salisbury, England. The parish includes the hamlets of Mooray and Portash, both close to the south of Chilmark village; and the dispersed hamlet of Ridge, to the southwest.

The stream through the village, often dry in summer, flows some two miles (3 km) south to join the River Nadder. The Fonthill estate extends into the west of the parish as far as Ridge.

== History ==
Roman artefacts have been found in the nearby quarries, and Purbeck limestone, possibly from Chilmark, was used in the construction of Roman mansions at the villages of West Grimstead and Rockbourne Villa.

The name Chilmark derives from the Old English cegelmearc meaning 'boundary pole'.

There was probably a church at Chilmark in the 12th century. Prior to the dissolution of the monasteries, the parish was owned by Wilton Abbey. King Henry VIII then awarded it to his last wife, Catherine Parr, and her descendents, the Earls of Pembroke.

Chilmark Manor, a house near the church, is a 17th-century building with 18th-century alterations.

== Religious sites ==
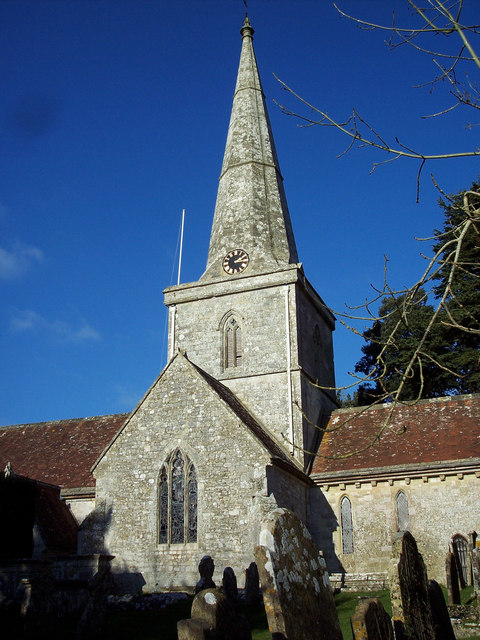
St Margaret of Antioch

Dedicated to St. Margaret of Antioch, Chilmark's Anglican parish church dates from the 13th century, with additions in the 14th and 18th centuries. It was most recently restored in 1856 by T.H. Wyatt. The steepled tower, rebuilt in about 1770, retains 13th-century lancet windows. The font has an original 13th-century bowl on a 19th-century base. The church contains several stained-glass windows from the 19th century, and in 1966 was designated as Grade II* listed. The churchyard has Grade II listed chest tombs from the 17th and 18th centuries.

A small Baptist chapel was built at Ridge sometime between 1851 and 1864, later becoming known as the Union chapel. By 2003 the building was in private hands.

== Chilmark Ravine ==
About a mile south of the village, the stream passes (together with a minor road) through a ravine, as it descends into the Nadder valley. Stone was quarried here from medieval times, and in the 20th century the ravine was the site of defence establishments. The western half of this area is in Teffont civil parish.

=== Quarries ===
Chilmark stone, a form of limestone, was quarried here and used for buildings including Salisbury Cathedral. Stone extraction continued on a small scale until the quarry closed c. 2007. Similar stone is still mined at Chicksgrove Quarry, 1.3 miles (2.1 km) to the southwest. The former quarries have been designated as a Site of Special Scientific Interest (biological and geological), and as a European Special Area of Conservation for their bat population.

=== RAF Chilmark ===
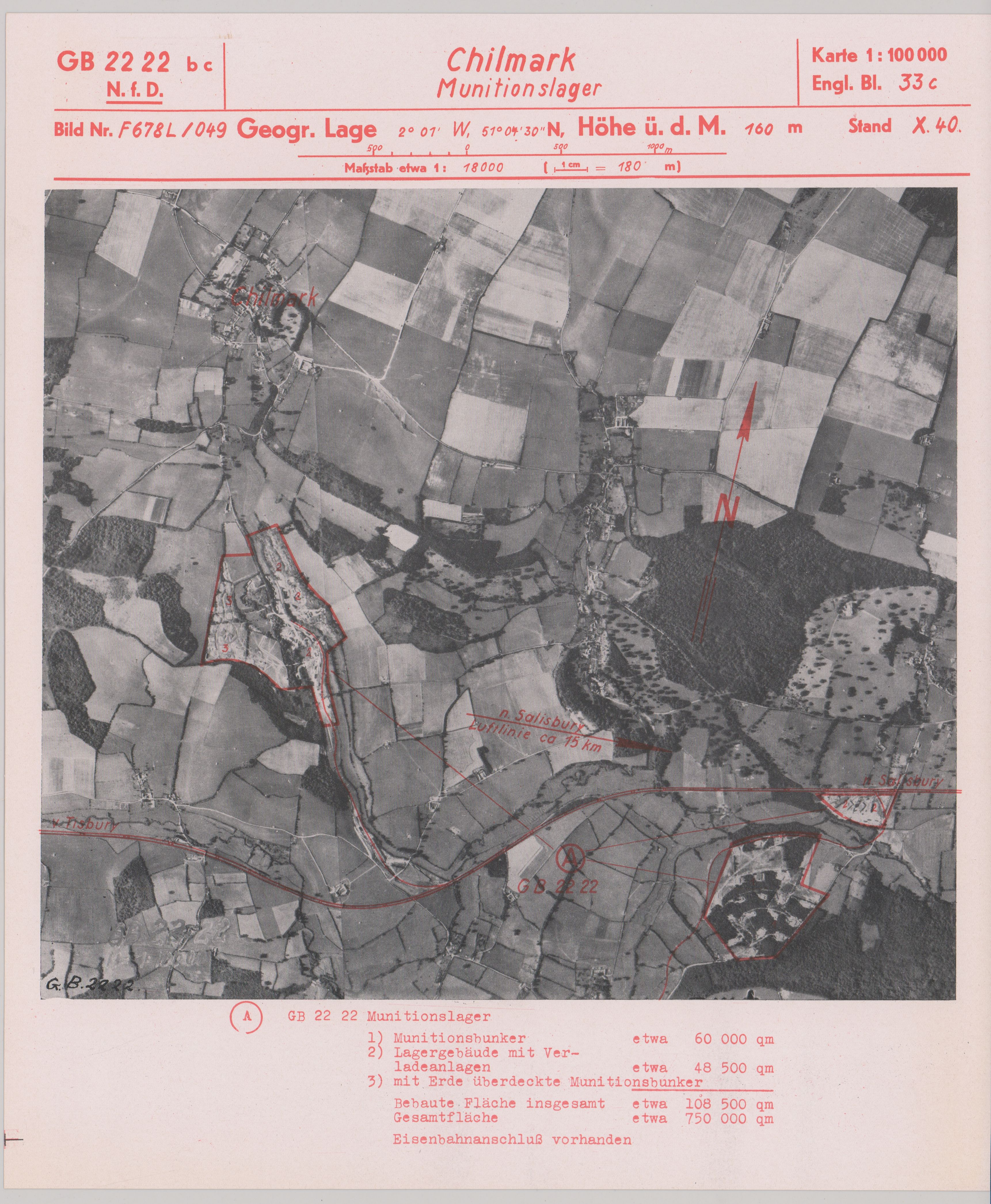
RAF Chilmark on a target dossier of the German Luftwaffe, 1940

In 1936 the quarries, and land extending further down the ravine, were bought by the Air Ministry and the site became RAF Chilmark, which was the home of No. 11 Maintenance Unit RAF. Munitions were stored in the quarry caverns, and for a time the unit had extensive above-ground storage areas in woodland near Dinton and in Grovely Wood.

A spur left the London-Exeter railway west of Dinton station at Ham Cross, just east of the bridge over the Chicksgrove-Fovant road, and entered the foot of the ravine; this spur was omitted from Ordnance Survey maps. Goods were transhipped under cover of a large shed, to/from a 2 ft gauge narrow-gauge railway which ran into the ravine and some of the former quarry caverns. Until c.1951, sidings at Wylye station on the Salisbury–Westbury line provided transport for the Grovely Wood area.

During the Second World War, Chilmark was the largest ammunition depot in southern England.

By 1965, Chilmark was the RAF's only ammunition supply depot. RAF Chilmark closed on 27 January 1995, although clearance of explosives from the site continued until at least 1997. A 1939 diesel locomotive used at the site was bought in 1976 by the Bala Lake Railway, North Wales; several wagons are at the Old Kiln Light Railway, Surrey.

==== Present ====
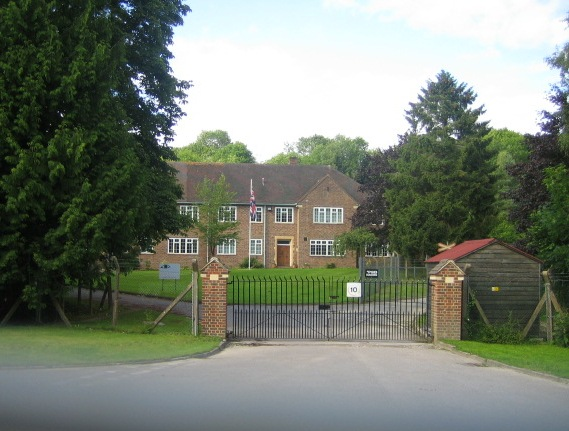
Former RAF Headquarters

A Planning Brief prepared by Salisbury District Council in 1999 concluded that options for re-use of the site, except for the former headquarters buildings, were limited owing to the presence of bat colonies and the possibility of contamination remaining from the storage of munitions.

Until 2015, the former RAF headquarters and some 55 acres (0.22 km^{2}) of land in and near the ravine were used by a private company as a training area for counter-terrorism security and explosives handling.

=== Civil defence bunker ===
An underground bunker was built in the ravine in 1985, ready to act as the Regional Government Headquarters (RGHQ) for the southwest region in the event of a nuclear attack. It ceased to be operational in 1992, following the end of the Cold War, and was sold in 1997.

During the night of 22 February 2017, officers from Wiltshire Police raided the bunker following information received that it had been converted for use as a cannabis farm. There are approximately 20 rooms in the building, split over two floors, each 200 feet long and 70 feet wide. Almost every room had been converted for the wholesale production of cannabis plants, and there was a large amount of evidence of previous crops. The farm was estimated to be able to produce £2m worth of cannabis per year using £250,000 worth of stolen electricity, with a crop of 4,000 plants every six weeks. The lighting equipment alone was estimated to have cost about £140,000. Three men admitted conspiracy to produce class B drugs and abstracting electricity. Charges of conspiracy to hold persons in slavery or servitude were initially made, but dropped due to lack of evidence. It took ten days to search and clear the site, which was said to be the biggest cannabis factory found in the southwest region. Custodial sentences were imposed on the three men in August 2017.

== Namesakes ==
Two settlements in the United States bear the same name. Chilmark, Massachusetts, on the island of Martha's Vineyard, was named in 1694 in connection with Governor Thomas Mayhew, who emigrated from nearby Tisbury and founded a colony on the island. In 1930, V. Everit Macy, an industrialist, established a suburb of Briarcliff Manor, New York and named it Chilmark after the home village of his ancestor Thomas Macy, who emigrated in 1635.

== Amenities ==
The village has a primary school, Chilmark and Fonthill Bishop CofE (VA) Primary School. The building began as a National School, built in Chilmark stone in 1860. In 1971 Chilmark school merged with Fonthill Bishop school; the building at Fontwell Bishop was closed and the accommodation at Chilmark extended.

The Reading Room of 1910 is now the village hall. The village has a pub, the Black Dog Inn.

== Notable residents ==
- Thomas Macy, an early settler of Amesbury, Massachusetts and Nantucket Island, was born in the town.
- John Wilcox (1931–2018), author of the Simon Fonthill series of 12 novels and four other books lived in Chilmark.

== See also ==
- Chilmark, Massachusetts, a city with the same name
