= Edric Holmes =

British author

Edric Edwin Holmes (c.1873 – 14 May 1949) was a British non-fiction topographical author. His first book on Sussex was described by The Observer as "jejune", however, his second on Wessex was praised for good judgement in content and presentation. London's Countryside (1927), which included 102 illustrations by the author, was noted by The Geographical Journal for encompassing an unfeasibly large area around the capital which made it difficult to cover the territory in any detail.

== Selected publications ==
- Seaward Sussex: The South Downs from End to End. Robert Scott, London, 1920. (Illustrated by Mary M. Vigers)
- Wanderings in Wessex: An Exploration of the Southern Realm from Itchen to Otter. Robert Scott, London, 1922.
- London's Countryside: The Rural Ways between Oxford and Canterbury, Cambridge and Guildford. Robert Scott, London, 1927.
