= Dinton, Wiltshire =

Village in Wiltshire, England

Coordinates: 51°04′59″N 1°58′52″W

Dinton
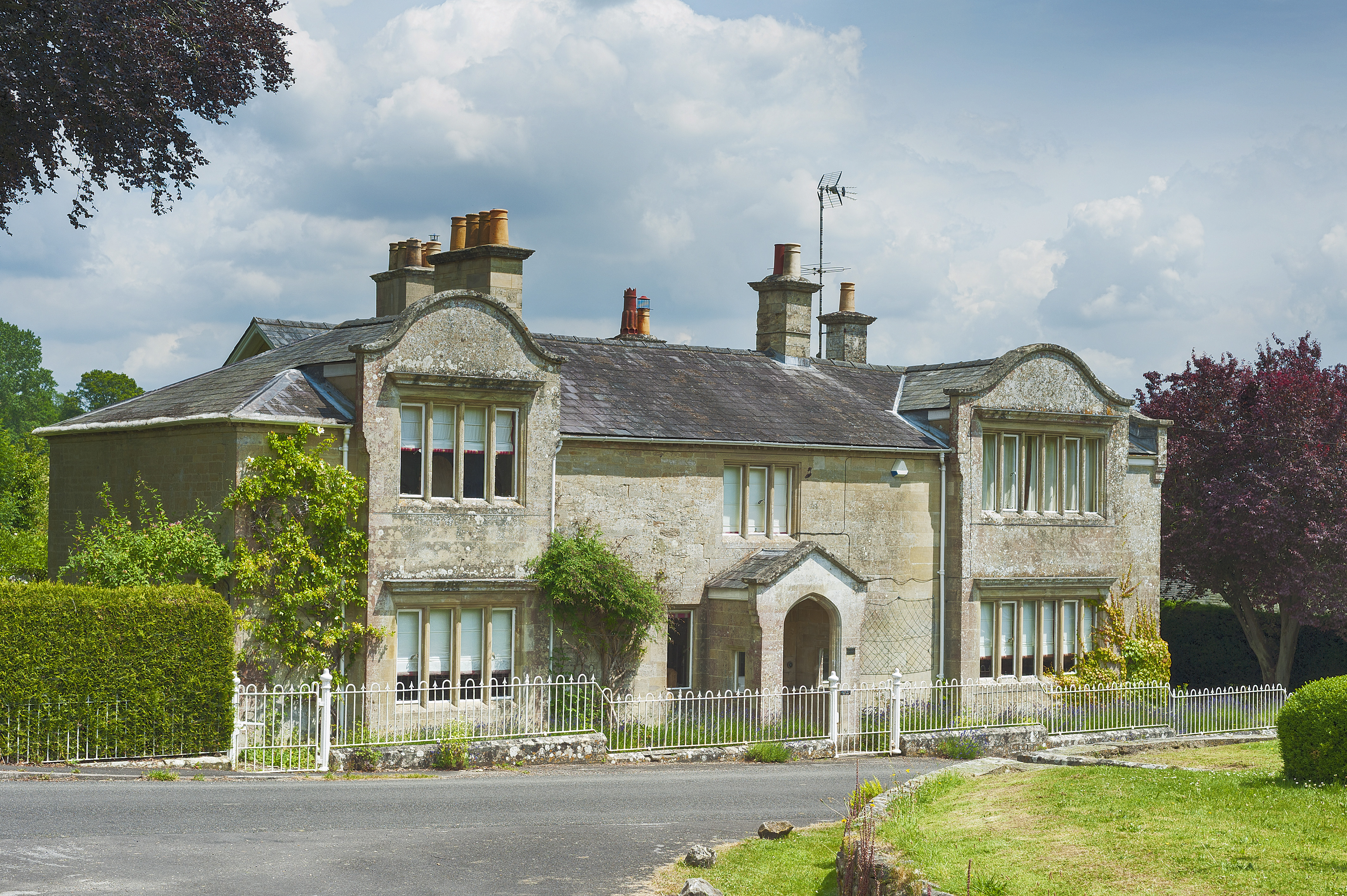
- Dinton Lodge

- Location within Wiltshire
- Population: 696 (in 2011)
- OS grid reference: SU014315
- Civil parish: Dinton
- Unitary authority: Wiltshire
- Ceremonial county: Wiltshire
- Region: South West
- Country: England
- Sovereign state: United Kingdom
- Post town: Salisbury
- Postcode district: SP3
- Dialling code: 01722
- Police: Wiltshire
- Fire: Dorset and Wiltshire
- Ambulance: South Western
- UK Parliament: Salisbury
- Website: Parish Council

Dinton is a village, civil parish and former manor in Wiltshire, England, in the Nadder valley on the B3089 road about 8 miles (13 km) west of Salisbury. The parish population was 696 at the 2011 census, estimated at 733 in 2019. The civil parish includes the village of Baverstock, about 1 mile (1.6 km) east of Dinton village.

== History ==
The northern bounds of the parish follow a prehistoric line known as Grim's Ditch, through downland overlooking the Wylye valley further north. Hanging Langford Camp, an Iron Age settlement, is just beyond the parish boundary. The hillfort known as Wick Ball Camp lies near the western boundary of the parish, partly within Dinton Park.

A Roman road from the Mendip lead mines to Old Sarum passed east–west, just south of the ditch. The Domesday Book of 1086 recorded a settlement of 37 households at Dinton, held by Shaftesbury Abbey.

After the Dissolution in 1540, much of Dinton's land was acquired by the Earls of Pembroke. Later other land was purchased by the Wyndham family, which created Dinton Park. All Pembroke and Wyndham land was sold in the 20th century.

Dinton had a school from an early date, with some 80 children attending in 1818. A National School was built in 1872 and took children of all ages until 1935, when those over 11 transferred to Wilton. The school became a Church of England voluntary controlled school in 1945.

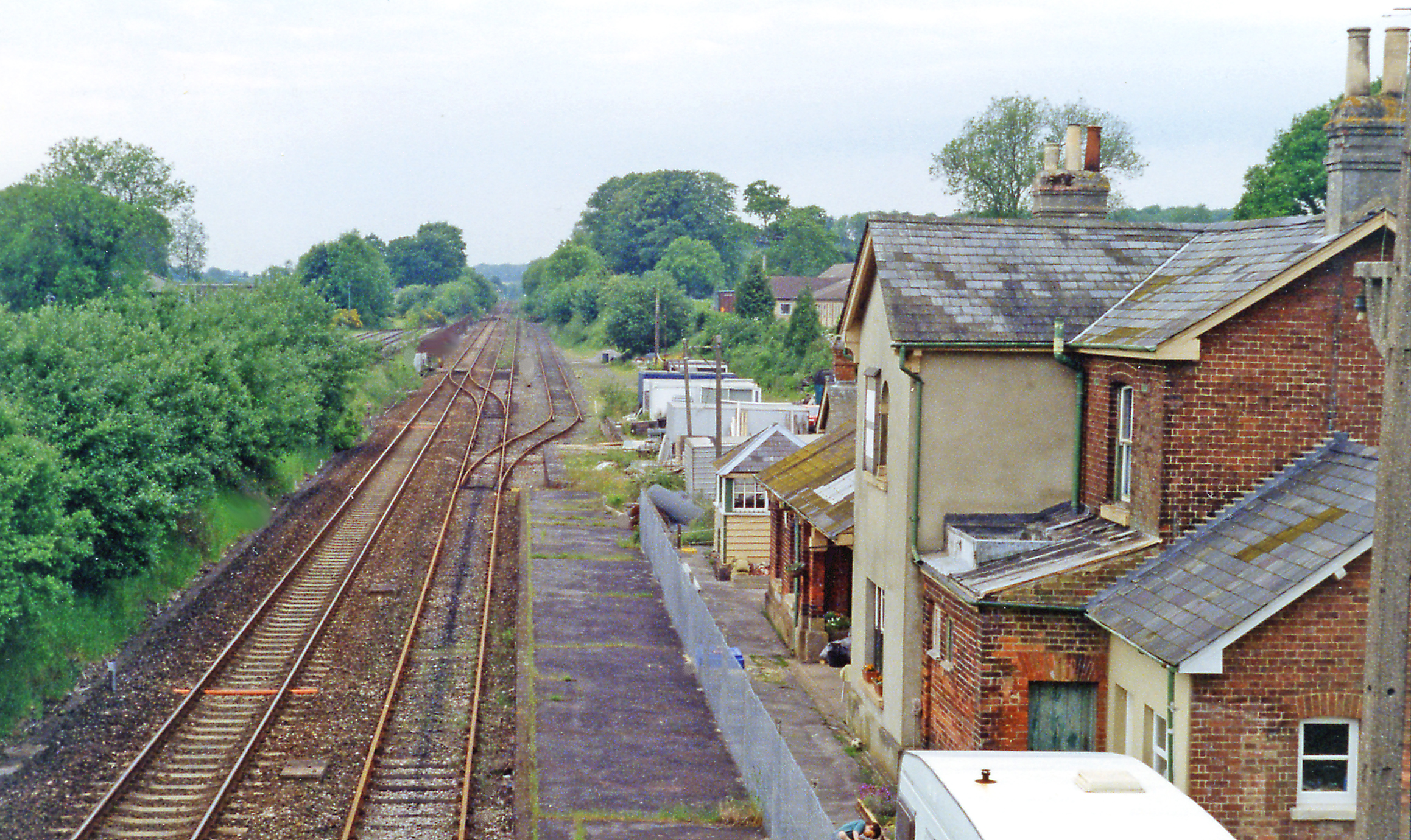
The station buildings in 1994

The Salisbury and Yeovil Railway was built across the parish in 1859, passing to the south of Dinton and Baverstock. Dinton station was south-west of the village on a lane towards Fovant. The station closed in 1966. A branch called the Fovant Military Railway, 2 1/2 miles (4.0 km) in length, ran south from near the station to the military camps around Fovant; it was opened in 1915 and closed in 1920.

In 1934 the parish was extended eastwards to absorb the ancient parish of Baverstock. Before, during and after the Second World War, the area was used for storing military equipment and ammunition. Some of these premises were outposts of RAF Chilmark.

== Churches ==
=== St Mary, Dinton ===
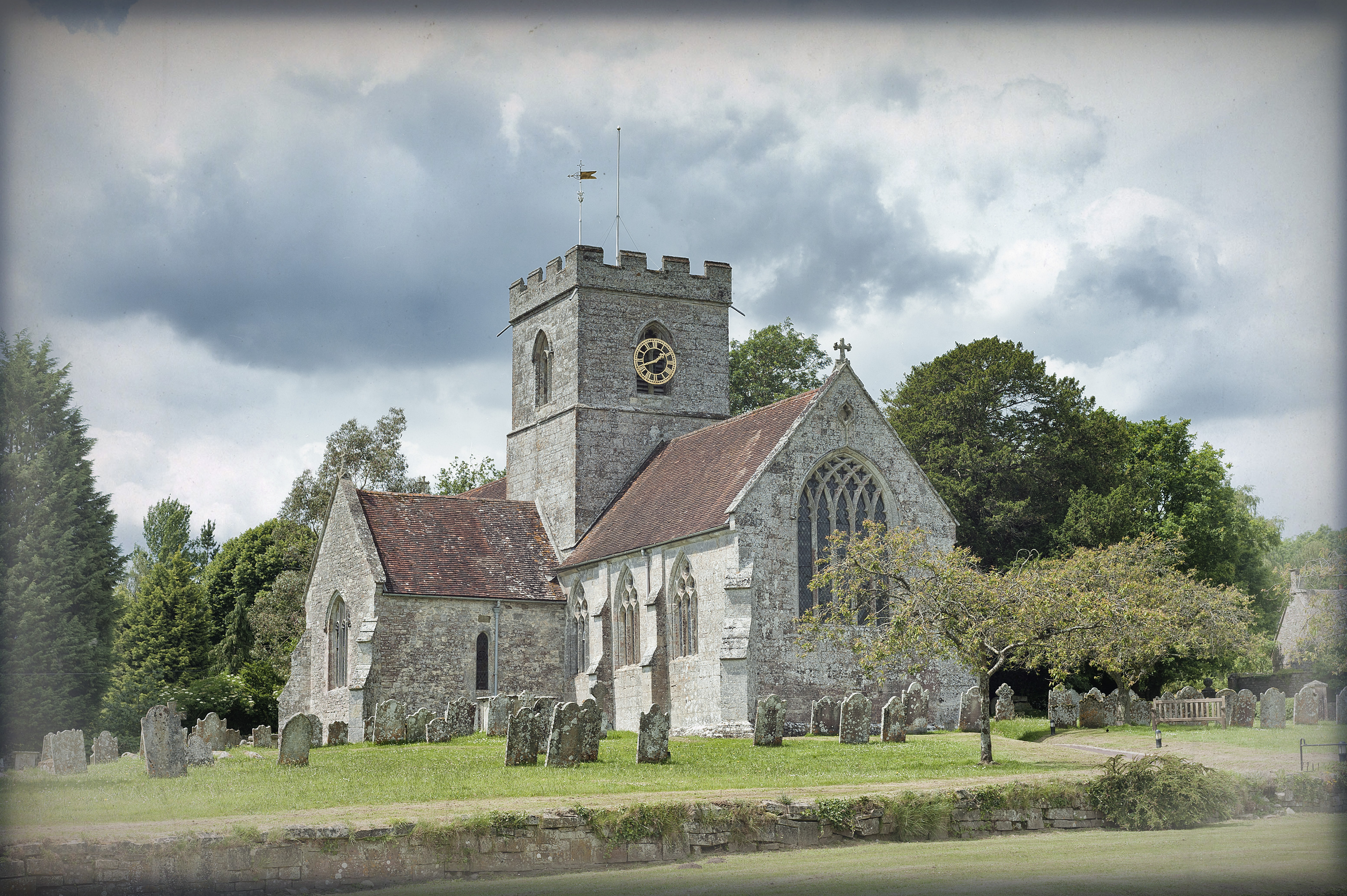
St Mary's Church

The Church of England parish church of St Mary the Virgin, begun in the late 12th century, is a Grade I listed building. The north doorway survives from the earliest work, while the rest of the church is largely from the 13th and 14th centuries. Restoration by William Butterfield in 1873–1875 included adding a south vestry and north porch. The tower has six bells, one from the 14th century and two from the 16th.

Until the Dissolution, Dinton was a prebend of Shaftesbury Abbey. St Edward's at Teffont Magna was a chapelry of Dinton until 1922. Today the church is part of the Nadder Valley team ministry, which also covers Baverstock and Teffont.

=== St Editha, Baverstock ===
The church at Baverstock, dedicated to Edith of Wilton, is from the 14th–15th centuries, with restoration in 1880–1893 by Butterfield. It is Grade II* listed.

== Notable buildings ==
Three listed houses are now owned by the National Trust.

Hyde's House, near Dinton church, is a Grade I listed former rectory, an early 18th-century rebuilding of an earlier house. Together with Philipps House and Dinton Park, it was given to the National Trust by Bertram Philips in 1943.

Philipps House, formerly Dinton House, was built in 1816 by William IV Wyndham (1769–1841) to designs by Sir Jeffry Wyatville, replacing a 17th-century house. The house stands in formal gardens and parkland known as Dinton Park. In 1916 the estate was bought by Bertram Philipps, who renamed the house after himself.

Little Clarendon, also Grade II* listed, is a late 17th-century former farmhouse. The house was restored in the early 20th century by George Herbert Engleheart (died 1936), a noted breeder of daffodils. His widow gave the house to the National Trust in 1940.

== Present day ==
The parish has local services, including two public houses and a village hall.

The railway remains open as part of the London Waterloo to Exeter line; the nearest station is Tisbury. The village school continues on the same site as Dinton C of E Primary School.

The Monarch's Way long-distance footpath crosses the parish north of Dinton, leaving via Grovely Wood.

== Descent of the manor ==
The manor estate of Dinton and Over Teffont (now Teffont Magna) belonged to Shaftesbury Abbey from before the Norman Conquest until the Dissolution, when it passed rapidly through the hands of various Tudor property speculators. It was granted in 1540 to Sir Thomas Arundell (died 1552), who immediately sold it, having obtained a licence of alienation, to Matthew Colthurst, who sold it in turn to William Green of Heale, in Woodford.

In 1547 the entire manor gained a long-term owner when it was granted to Sir William Herbert (1501–1570), later 1st Earl of Pembroke. It remained part of the family's nearby estate of Wilton until 1918, when it was sold in lots and dismembered.

== Subsidiary estates ==
=== Hyde ===
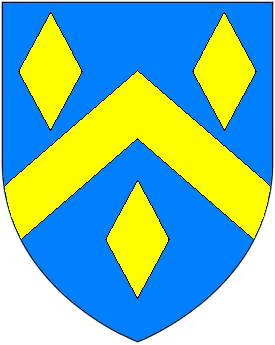
Arms of Hyde: Azure, a chevron between three lozenges or

The rectory and advowson of Dinton were sold in 1585 by Henry Herbert, 2nd Earl of Pembroke (1534–1601) to Lawrence Hyde I (died 1590) of West Hatch, MP for Heytesbury in 1584. His eldest son Robert Hyde I sold them in 1594 to his brother Sir Lawrence Hyde II (1562–1641), attorney-general to Anne of Denmark, wife of King James I. They were inherited by the latter's son Sir Robert Hyde II (died 1665), Chief Justice of Common Pleas, who died without surviving issue, and then passed to his nephew, Robert Hyde III (died 1722), son of Alexander Hyde, Bishop of Salisbury. Robert III died without progeny and bequeathed the rectory and advowson to his cousin Rev. Robert Hyde IV (died 1723), a Fellow of Magdalen College, Oxford, who in turn passed them to his college, which retained them until 1950, when they passed to the Bishop of Salisbury.

The brother of Sir Lawrence Hyde II, lay rector of Dinton, was Henry Hyde (c. 1563–1634), MP, father of the statesman Edward Hyde, 1st Earl of Clarendon (1609–1674), who was born at Dinton. The estate of Little Clarendon is within the parish of Dinton, and was apparently the origin of the appellation he chose for his earldom. Henry Hyde appears to have leased the rectory and advowson of Dinton from his brother, and it was probably in the rectory house that the future Earl of Clarendon was born. Henry Hyde moved away to Purton between 1623 and 1625.

=== Wyndham ===
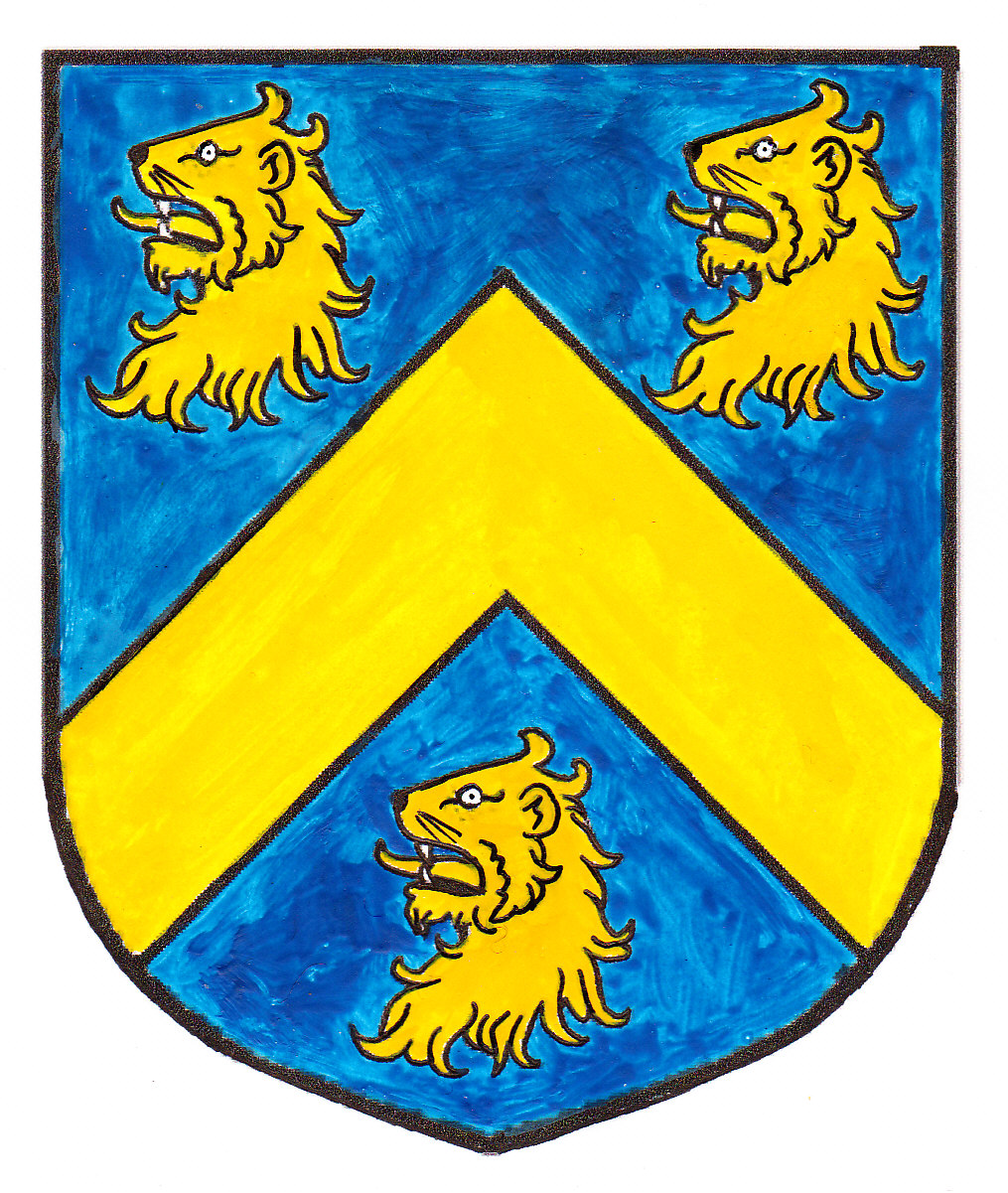
Arms of Wyndham: Azure, a chevron between three lion's heads erased or

The descent of another estate in Dinton in the Wyndham family went as follows:

- William I Wyndham (1659–1734) bought the manor in 1689. He was the third son of Sir Wadham Wyndham (1609–1668), of Norrington, Wiltshire, a judge of the King's Bench and ninth son of Sir John Wyndham (1558–1645) of Orchard Wyndham, Somerset. William I married Henrietta Stratford, a daughter and co-heiress of Henry Stratford of Hawling, Gloucestershire.
- William II Windham (died 1762), eldest son, inherited Dinton from his father and Hawling from his mother. He married Barbara Smith, daughter and heiress of Michael Smith of Stanton St Bernard, Wiltshire.
- William III Wyndham (died 1786), eldest son, of Dinton and Hawling, was a pioneer in agricultural improvement. He married in 1767 Elizabeth Heathcote (died 1809), a daughter of Sir Thomas Heathcote, 2nd Baronet (1721–1787), of Hursley Park, Southampton.
- William IV Wyndham (1769–1841), eldest son, of Dinton, inherited the manor of Norrington from his Wyndham cousin, descended from the eldest son of the judge Sir Wadham Wyndham (died 1668). He married in 1794 Laetitia Popham (died 1837), daughter of Alexander Popham, a Master in Chancery. In 1816 he built the present house to designs by Sir Jeffry Wyattville.
- William V Wyndham (1796–1862), of Dinton, eldest son, JP, DL, MP for Wiltshire South 1852–1859, married in 1831 Ellen Heathcote (died 1883), eldest daughter of Rev. Samuel Heathcote of Bramshaw Hill, Hampshire.
- William VI Wyndham (1834–1914), eldest son, JP, DL, of Dinton, was heir male to his grandfather under the will of a distant cousin George Francis Wyndham (1786–1845), who shared descent from Sir John Wyndham (1558–1645) of Orchard Wyndham, after the death in 1876 of the 4th Earl's widow, who had retained a life interest. He thus inherited the ancient family manor of Orchard Wyndham. He married in 1867 Frances Ann Stafford (died 1934), second daughter of Rev. Charles James Stafford, vicar of Dinton.
- William VII Wyndham (born 1868), eldest son, JP, of Orchard Wyndham, sold Dinton in 1916 to Bertram Philipps.
