= Chilmark Quarries =

Stone quarry in Wiltshire, England

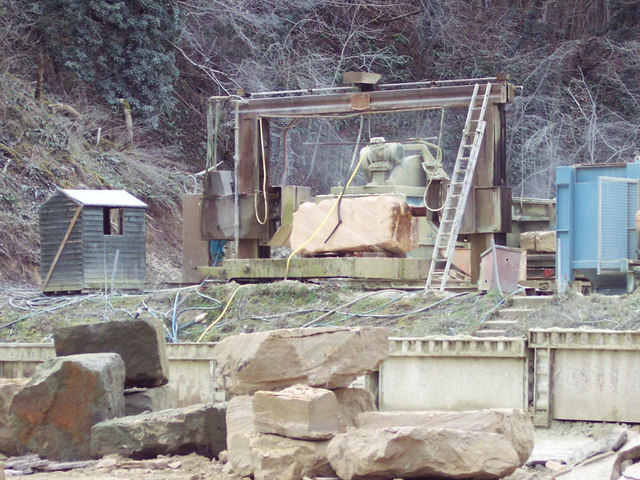
- Stone being worked at Chilmark, 2007

- Location within the United Kingdom
- Location: Wiltshire, South West England
- Coordinates: 51°4′48″N 2°2′11″W
- Area: 9.65 ha (23.8 acres)
- Established: 1977
- Governing body: Natural England
- Website: SAC at MAgiC

Chilmark Quarries (grid reference ST974312) is a 9.65 hectare biological and geological Site of Special Scientific Interest (SSSI), in the ravine south of the village of Chilmark in Wiltshire, England.

The SSSI was first notified in 1977. Its importance as a home for bats led to the site being designated in 2005 (together with Fonthill Grottoes) as a European Special Area of Conservation.

The western section of the site is in Chilmark civil parish, while the eastern section (separated by a minor road) is in Teffont parish.

== History ==
Chilmark stone, a form of limestone, was mined here from medieval times and was used for buildings including Salisbury Cathedral. In 1936 the quarry and mines were bought by the Air Ministry and used as a storage area for RAF Chilmark, a munitions depot, until 1995. Stone extraction was done intermittently since then, but as of 2025 has ceased.

== Biological interest ==
Within the disused quarries on the western side of the valley, there is a system of caves in which up to 150 bats, of several species, roost in winter. Species which use the site include greater and lesser horseshoe bats, Daubenton's bat, Natterer's bat and Brandt's bat. The quarries have been suggested to be the largest British hibernation roost of the Bechstein's bat, but it remains uncertain whether Bechstein's bats hibernate in caves and mines.

== Geological interest ==
The quarry has exposures of Jurassic rocks, part of the Purbeckian beds. It is a fine building stone used for the main structure of Salisbury Cathedral and many other local buildings. Purbeckian limestones, possibly from Chilmark, were used for packing around at least one of the upright stones of Stonehenge, for houses on an Iron Age site at Fifield Bavant, and for Rockbourne Roman Villa and other Roman sites. Chilmark stone is easy to work, but long-lived in use. Fossils are uncommon in the beds recently being extracted, but include ammonites and other shells.
