= River Nadder =

River in south Wiltshire, England

Coordinates: 51°03′N 1°48′W

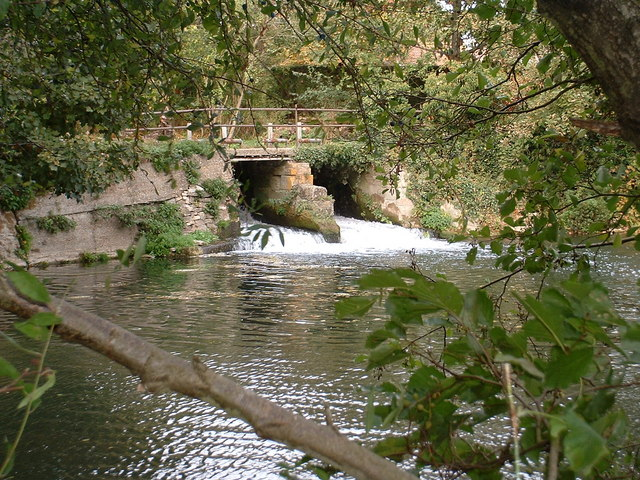
The Nadder at Teffont Mill

The River Nadder is a tributary of the River Avon, flowing in south Wiltshire, England.

== Etymology ==
The name is derived from a Celtic word *nootr, "flowing water", from the same root as the Latin natare, "to swim". (Hoare's account of Wiltshire gives a folk etymology which is still popular, deriving it from adder.)

== Course ==
The river flows north from Ludwell to West End where it is joined by the Ferne Brook, close to the Lower Coombe and Ferne Brook Meadows site of special scientific interest (SSSI). At Wardour it is joined by the River Sem. The river then flows east through Tisbury, where it is joined by the Fonthill Brook, and then onto Barford St Martin and Burcombe before reaching Wilton. Near Quidhampton, the Wylye joins from the north. After passing Harnham, the Nadder joins the Avon near Salisbury Cathedral.

Including its headwaters, the river's length is about 55 km (34 mi).

== Water quality ==
The Environment Agency measures the water quality of the river systems in England. Each is given an overall ecological status, which may be one of five levels: high, good, moderate, poor and bad. There are several components that are used to determine this, including biological status, which looks at the quantity and varieties of invertebrates, angiosperms and fish. Chemical status, which compares the concentrations of various chemicals against known safe concentrations, is rated good or fail.

Water quality of the River Nadder in 2019:

Section	Ecological Status	Chemical Status	Overall Status	Length	Catchment	Channel
Nadder (Headwaters)	Poor	Fail	Poor	6.698 km (4.162 mi)	34.713 km^{2} (13.403 sq mi)	
Nadder (Upper)	Moderate	Fail	Moderate	5.282 km (3.282 mi)	10.934 km^{2} (4.222 sq mi)	
Nadder (Middle	Moderate	Fail	Moderate	30.807 km (19.143 mi)	72.107 km^{2} (27.841 sq mi)	
Nadder (Lower)	Good	Fail	Moderate	11.951 km (7.426 mi)	15.021 km^{2} (5.800 sq mi)	

== Image gallery ==
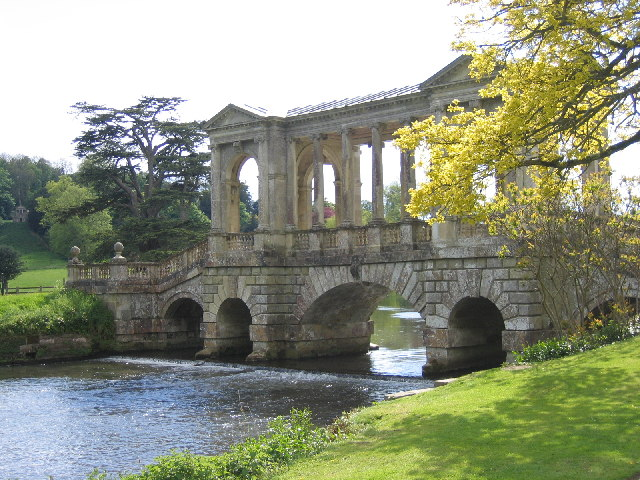
Flowing under the Palladian Bridge at Wilton House

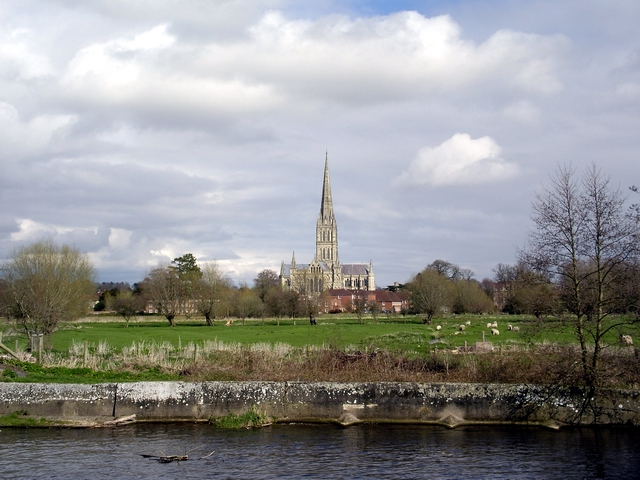
Salisbury Cathedral seen from the banks of the Nadder

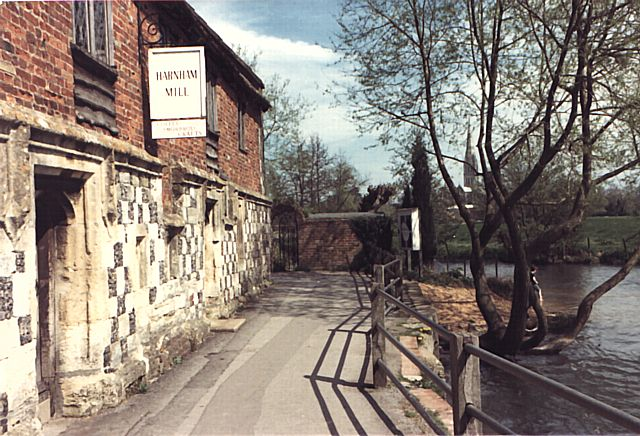
The watermill at Harnham is near where the Nadder meets the Avon

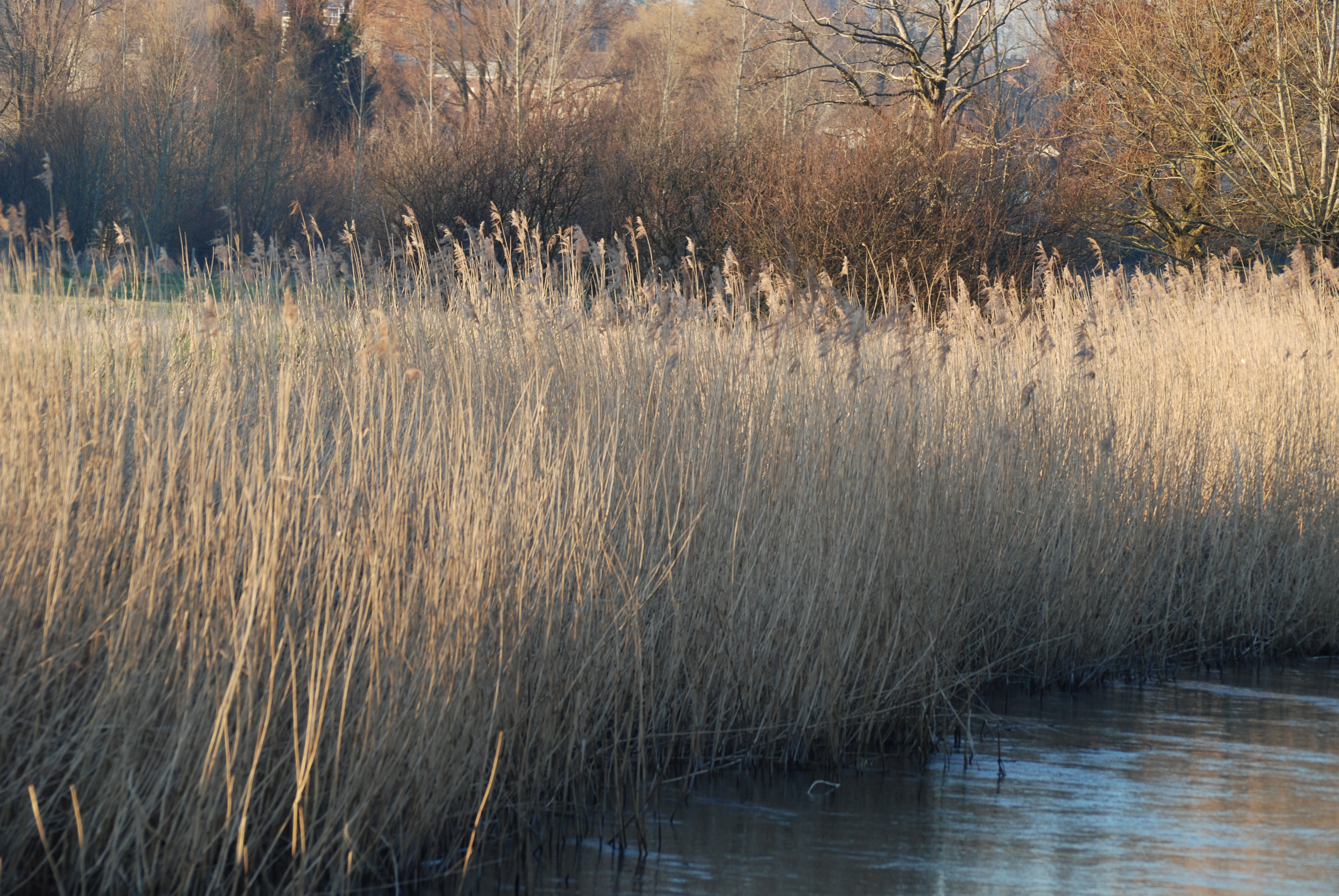
Reed beds along the banks of the Nadder at Harnham
