= Yoke (aeronautics) =

Aircraft controls

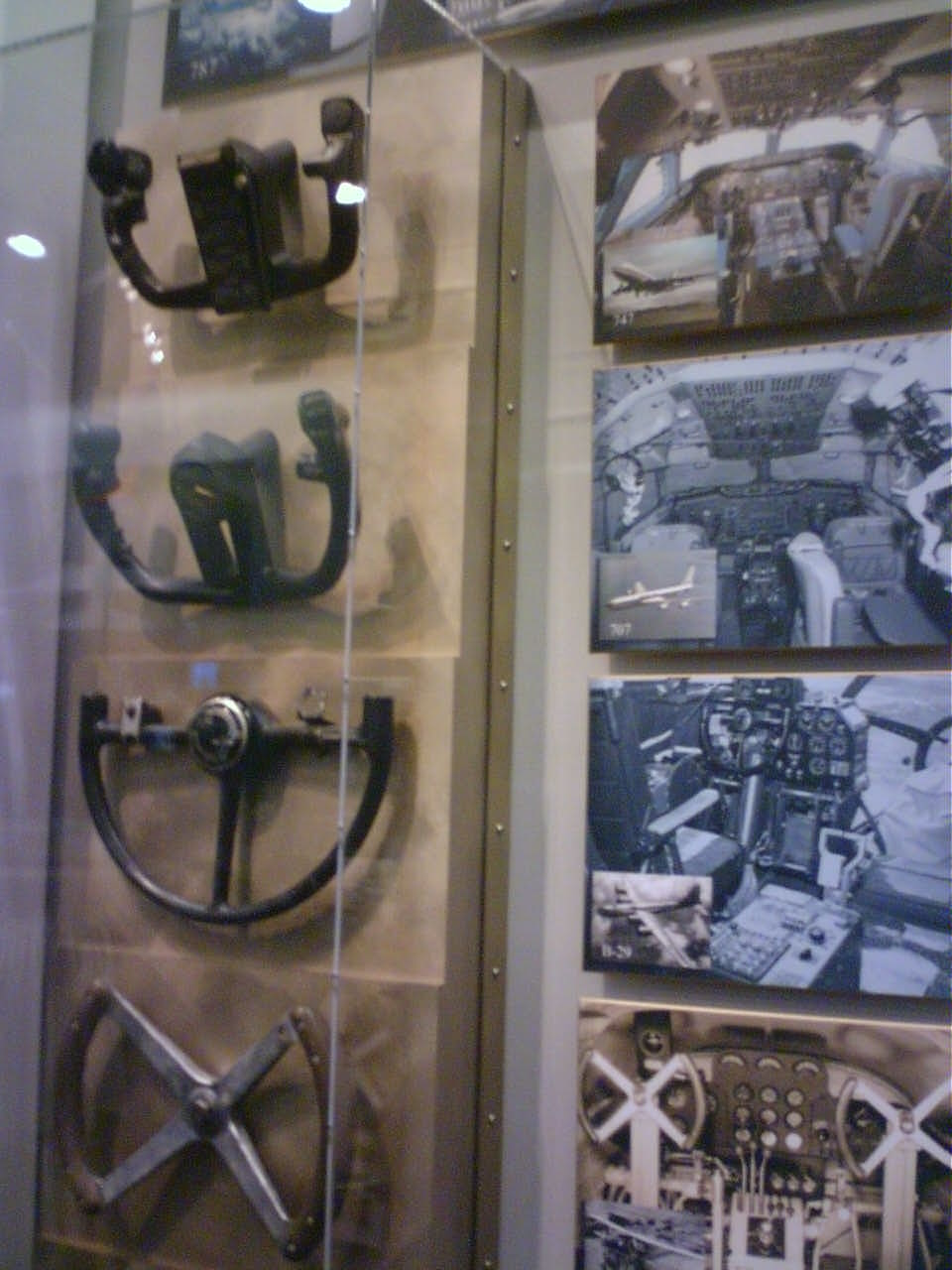
Collection of control yokes at Boeing Future of Flight Museum: 747, 707, B-29, Trimotor. The former two yokes are W-shaped, while the latter two are circular.

A yoke, alternatively known as a control wheel or a control column, is a device used for piloting some fixed-wing aircraft.

The pilot uses the yoke to control the attitude of the plane, usually in both pitch and roll. Rotating the control wheel controls the ailerons and the roll axis. Fore and aft movement of the control column controls the elevator and the pitch axis. When the yoke is pulled back, the nose of the aircraft rises. When the yoke is pushed forward, the nose is lowered. When the yoke is turned left, the plane rolls to the left, and when it is turned to the right, the plane rolls to the right.

Small to medium-size aircraft, usually limited to propeller-driven, feature a mechanical system whereby the yoke is connected directly to the control surfaces with cables and rods. Human muscle power alone is not enough for larger and more powerful aircraft, so hydraulic systems are used, in which yoke movements control hydraulic valves and actuators. In more modern aircraft, inputs may first be sent to a fly-by-wire system, which then sends a corresponding signal to actuators attached to the aileron booster systems and control surfaces. Yokes may feature a stick shaker, which is designed to help indicate the onset of stall, or even a stick pusher, which physically pushes the yoke to prevent a stall.

== Styles ==
Yokes come in a variety of shapes and sizes, the most common being of a "U" or "W" design. Some aircraft use a "ram's horn" style yoke, shaped like an "M", such as Embraer aircraft and the Concorde. There are some rarer exotic or archaic styles, such as circular or semi-circular designs, much like a steering wheel.

In larger aircraft they are usually on a post protruding vertically from the floor, referred to as a control column. In most other planes, they are pivot point mounted on a horizontal tube that comes out of the instrument panel.

In the case of the Cirrus SR20 and Cirrus SR22, although the control looks like a side stick, it works like a yoke handle (referred to in the industry as a "side yoke"). The Cessna 162 uses a similar device.

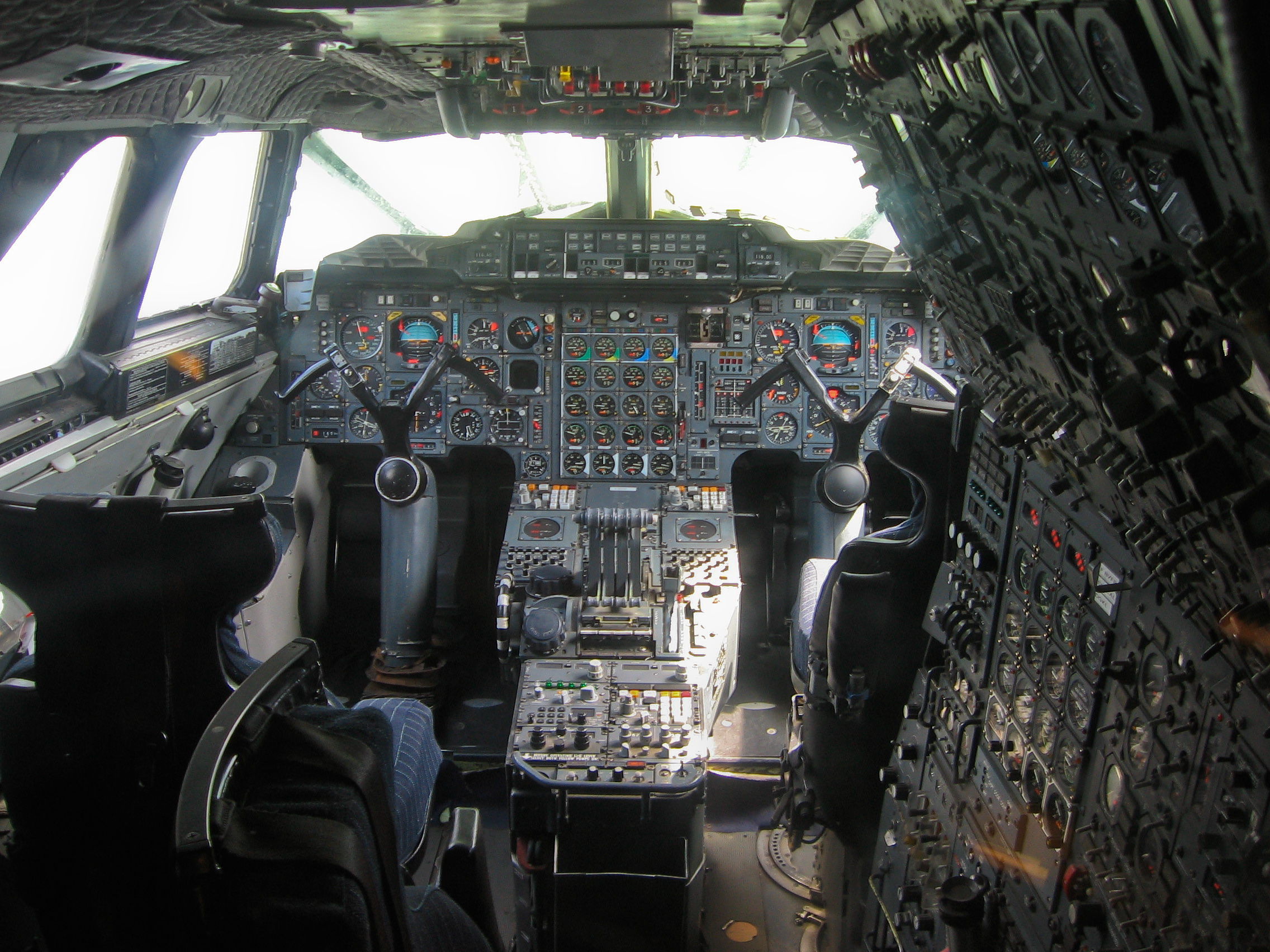
The cockpit of Concorde, which has an M-shaped yoke mounted on a control column

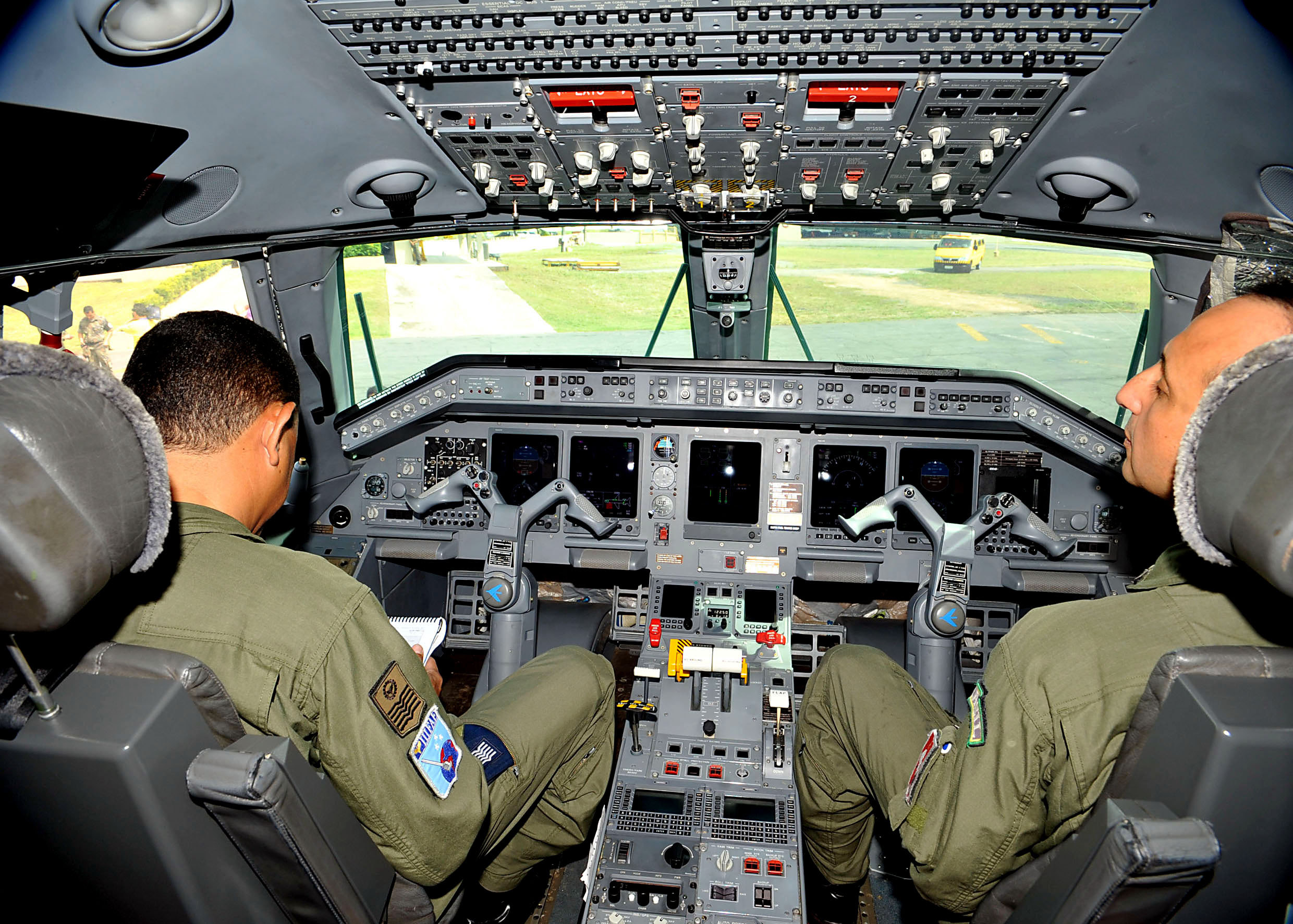
The cockpit of an Embraer ERJ with an M-shaped yoke

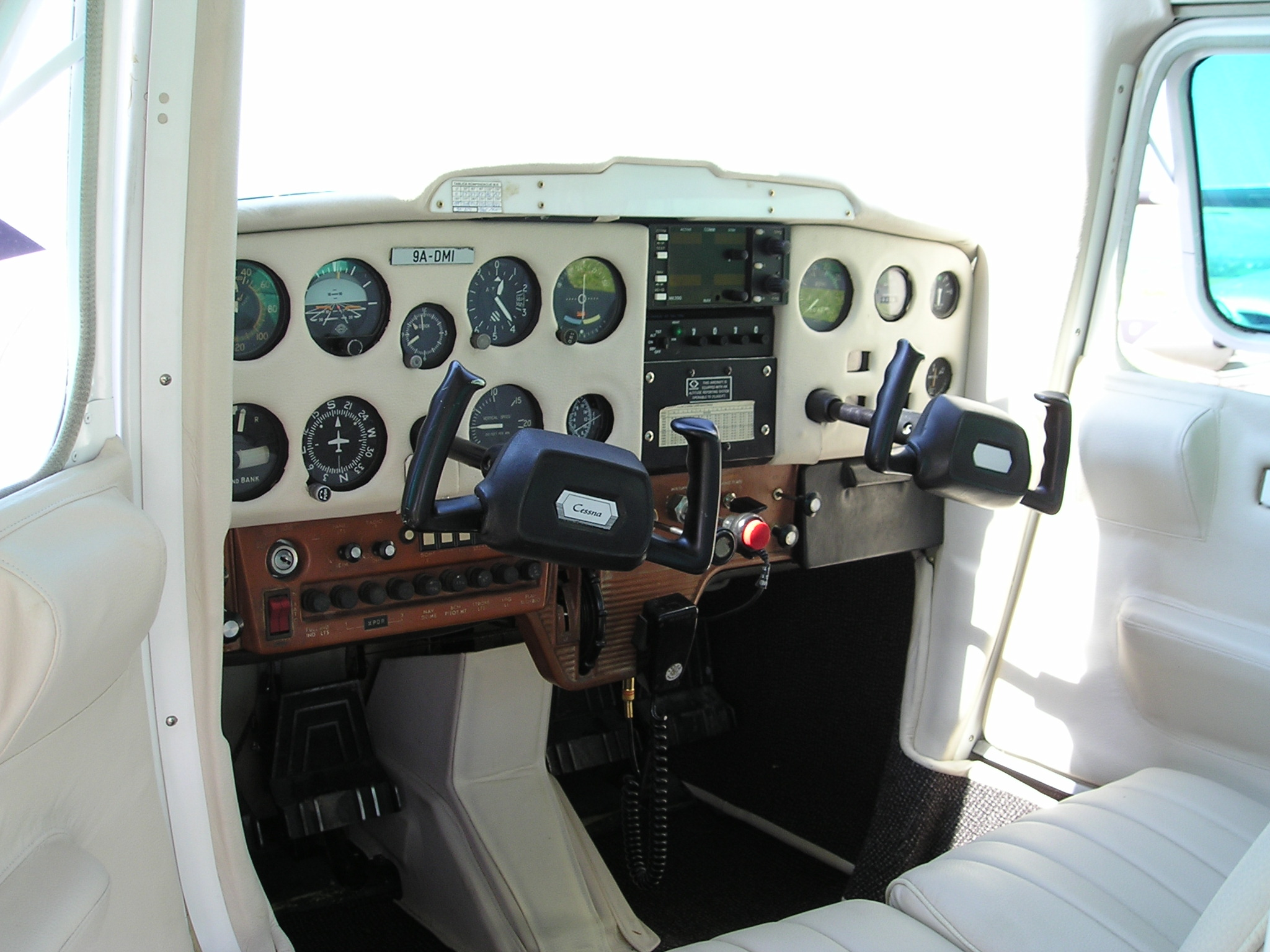
"W"/"U" style yoke in a Cessna 152 light aircraft, mounted on a horizontal tube protruding from the instrumental panel

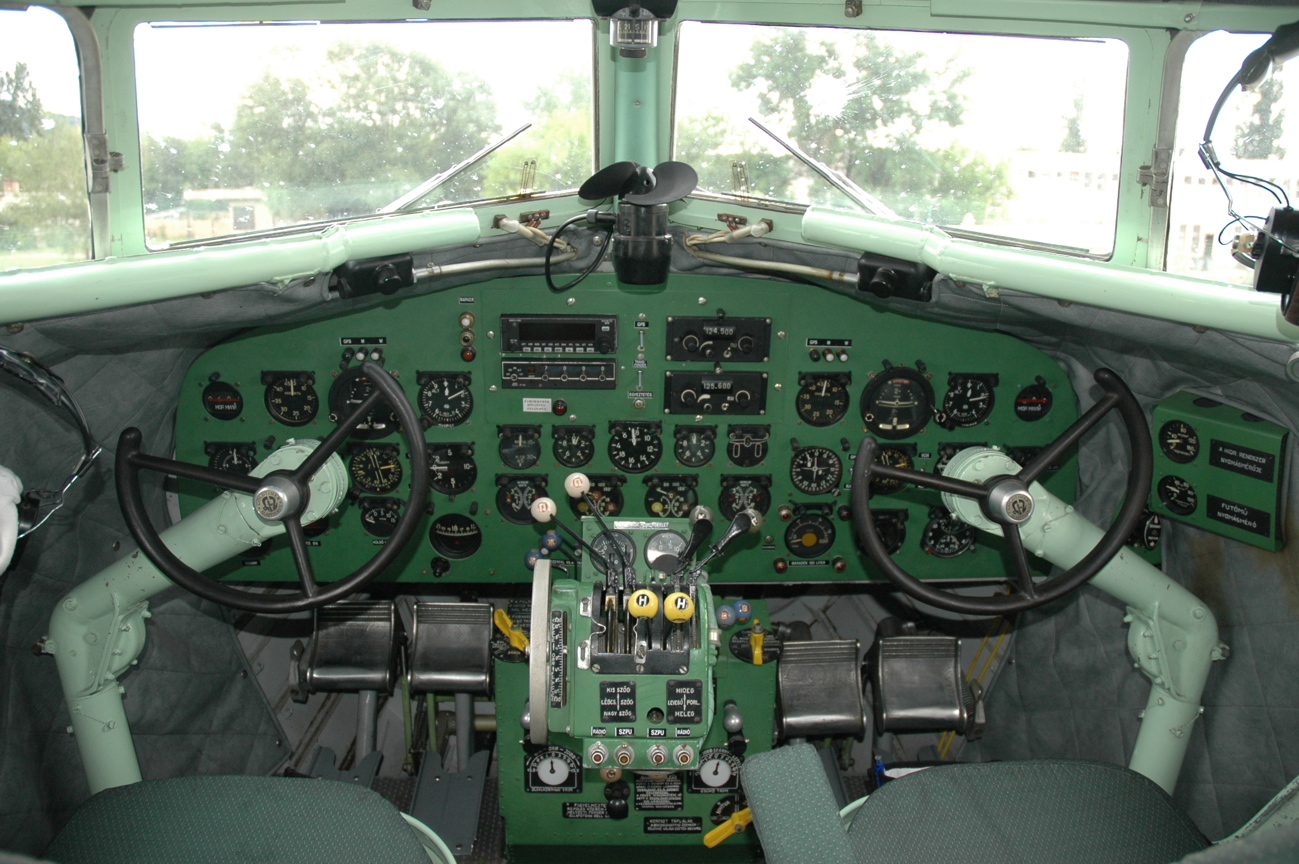
Circular, steering-wheel type yoke in a 1940s Lisunov Li-2

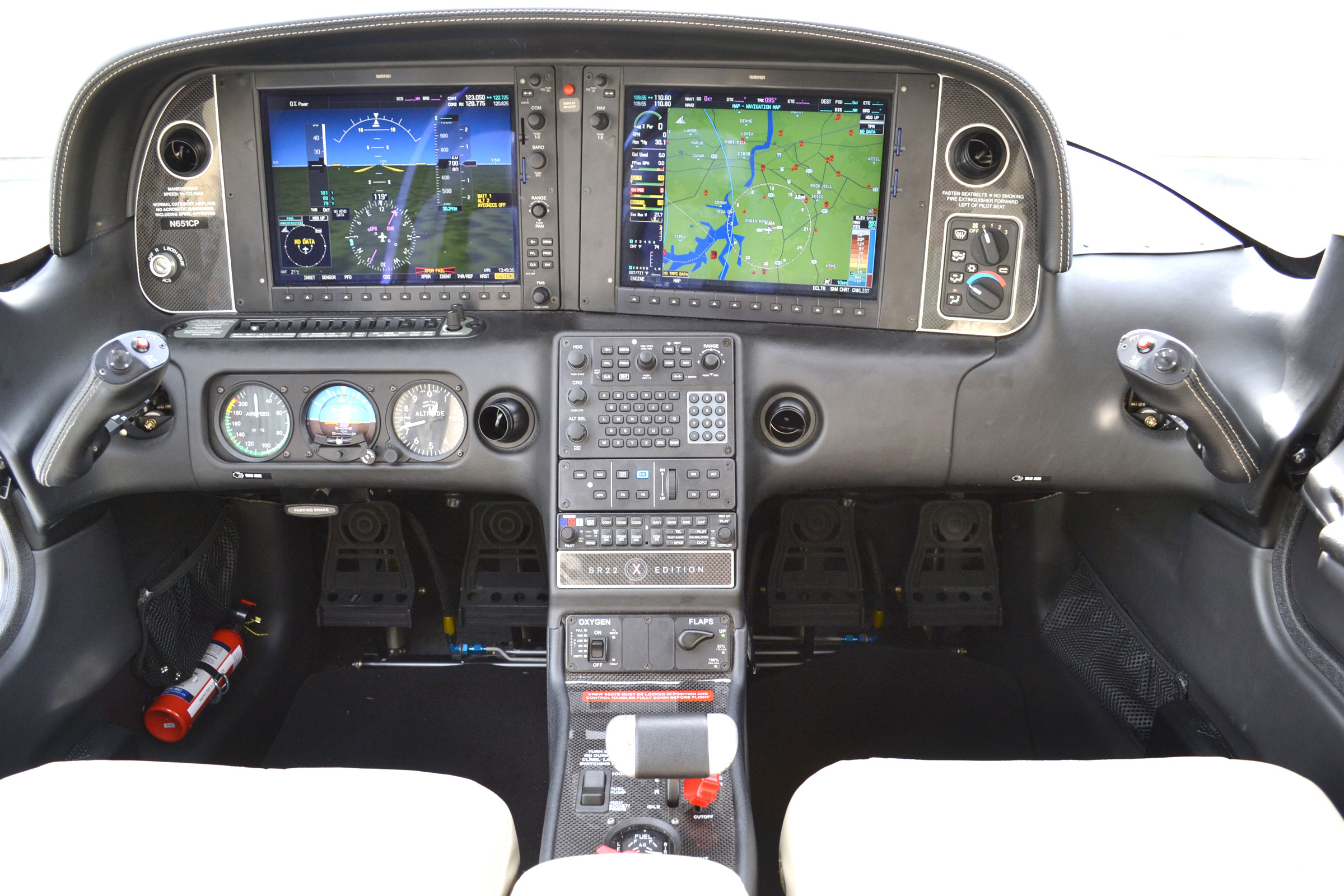
Cirrus SR22 panel showing both side yokes

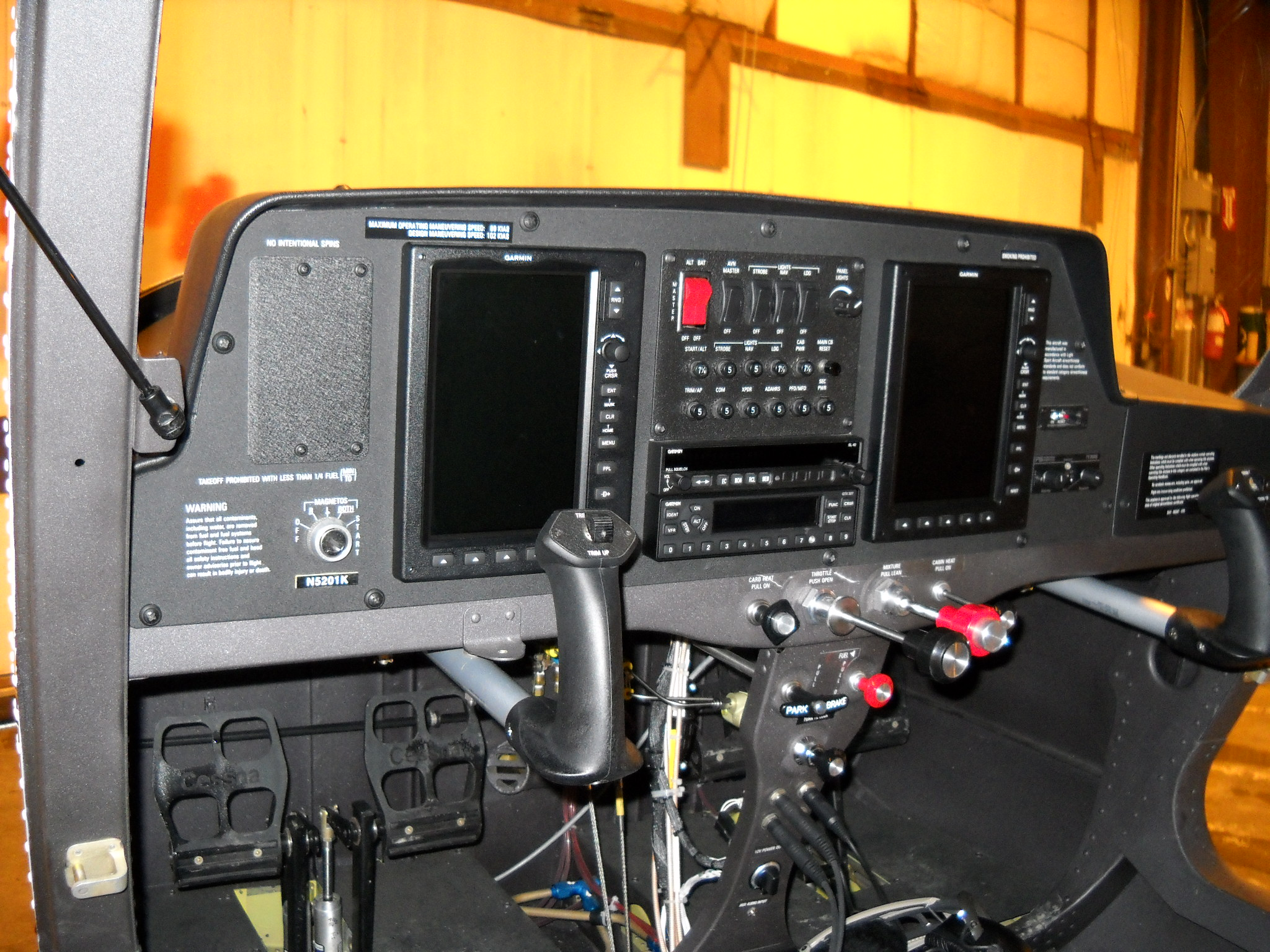
Cessna 162 Skycatcher instrument panel

== Advantages and disadvantages ==
Side-sticks and centre-sticks are better for making rapid control inputs and dealing with high g-forces, hence their use in military, sport, and aerobatic aircraft. However, yokes are less sensitive (i.e. more precise) due to a larger range of motion and provide more visual feedback to the pilot.

Most yokes are connected and will both move together, thus providing instant indication to the other pilot when one makes a control input. This is in contrast to some fly-by-wire control sticks that allow each pilot to send different, and sometimes greatly conflicting, inputs. Competing inputs are signaled on Airbus craft.

Yokes take up more room than side-sticks in the cockpit and may even obscure some instruments; by comparison, side-sticks have minimal cockpit intrusion, allowing the inclusion of retractable tray-tables and making it easier to enter/leave small cockpits.

A yoke, unlike a side-stick, may be used comfortably with either hand. This can be useful if one needs to write or manipulate other controls in the cockpit. This advantage is shared with the center-stick. Conversely, yokes are generally more fatiguing to use when maneuvering or in IFR conditions. On the other hand, as most general aviation aircraft do not have boosted controls, the larger moment arm of a yoke over a side stick means that less force is required from the pilot to move the control surfaces. However, this issue may be addressed by adding gearing to a side stick.

The central placement of a yoke is more likely to cause injury in the event of a crash.

== Ancillary functions ==
The yoke often incorporates other key functions such as housing thumb or finger buttons to enable the radio microphone, disengage the autopilot, and trim the aircraft. In addition, there may be a clipboard, checklist, or chronometer located in the yoke's center.

== Alternative control systems ==
Yokes are not used on all aircraft. Airships use a ship's wheel, helicopters use a cyclic, and the majority of military fighter aircraft use a center or side-stick. Some light aircraft use a stick due to pilot preference. The latest Airbus family of passenger jets use a side-stick, similar to a joystick, to actuate control surfaces.

There are also computer input devices designed to simulate a yoke, intended for flight simulators.

== See also ==
- Index of aviation articles
- Aircraft flight control system
- HOTAS, an acronym for hands on throttle-and-stick
- Rudder pedals
