= 1966 Felthorpe Trident crash =

Crash of a Trident airliner in a pre-delivery flight in 1966

Felthorpe Trident crash
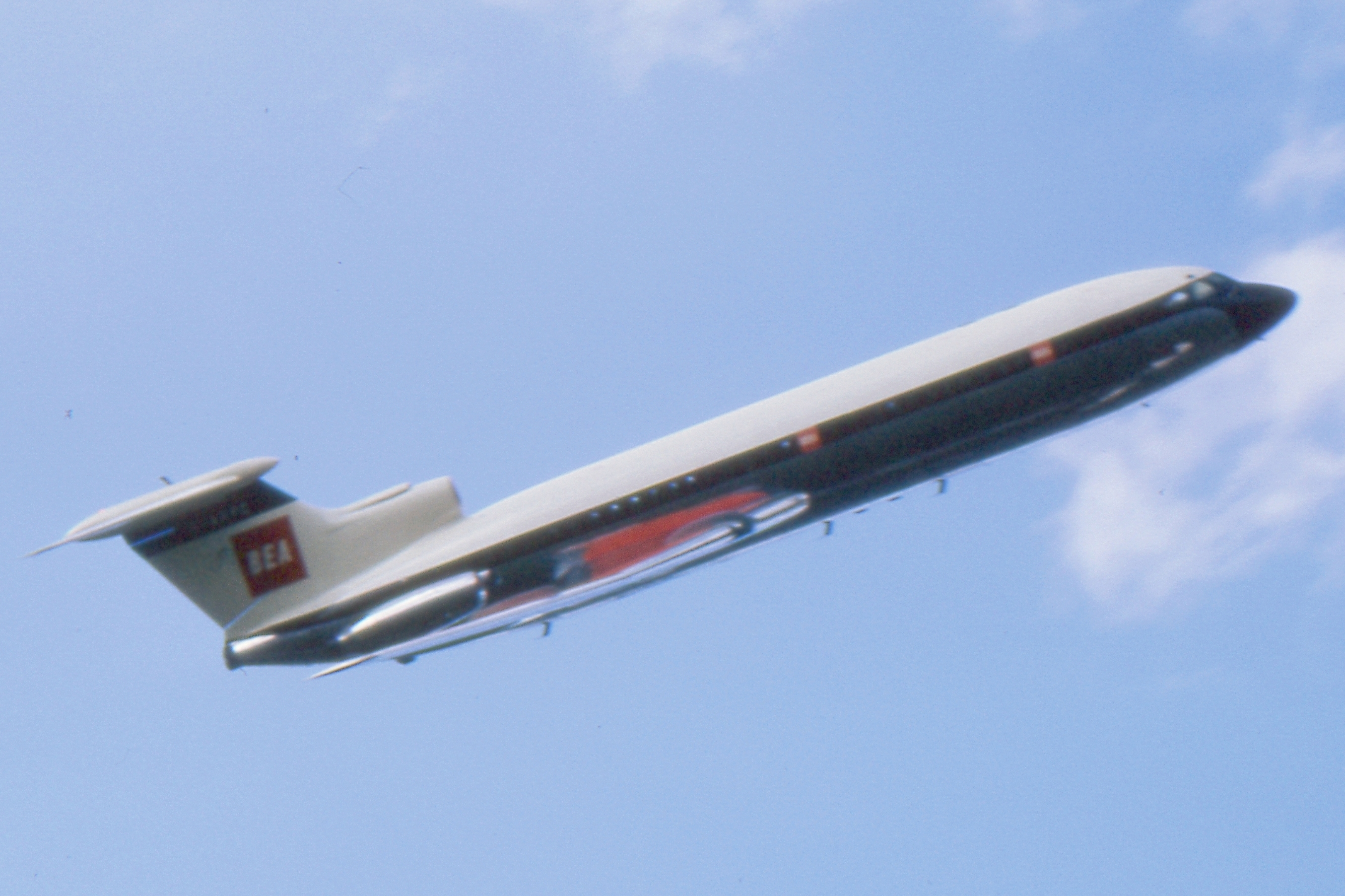
- A Trident identical to the accident aircraft, here photographed during a display flight

Accident
- Date: 3 June 1966
- Summary: Deep stall due to pilot error
- Site: Felthorpe, Norfolk, United Kingdom; 52.702516°N 1.193228°E

Aircraft
- Aircraft type: Hawker Siddeley Trident 1C
- Operator: Hawker Siddeley
- Registration: G-ARPY
- Flight origin: Hatfield Aerodrome
- Destination: Hatfield Aerodrome
- Occupants: 4
- Crew: 4
- Fatalities: 4
- Survivors: 0

On 3 June 1966, a newly built Hawker Siddeley Trident jetliner crashed during a pre-delivery test flight near the village of Felthorpe, Norfolk, England, killing all four crew. The aeroplane had entered a deep stall from which the crew were unable to recover. It was the first loss of a Trident aircraft.

== Aircraft and crew ==
=== Aircraft ===
The aircraft involved was a tri-jet Hawker Siddeley Trident 1C, registration G-ARPY, that was about to be delivered to British European Airways.

=== Crew ===
The crew were pilots Peter Barlow and George Errington, and technicians E. Brackstone-Brown and G.W. Patterson.

== Accident flight ==
Deep stall illustrated

The aircraft was making its first flight, which was a routine test flight to enable the aircraft's Certificate of Airworthiness to be issued. There were four crew on board. The aircraft took off from Hatfield Aerodrome at 16:52. Tests established that the stick shaker operated at 102 knots (189 km/h), and that stall recovery system operated at 93 knots (172 km/h). The crew then disconnected the stall warning systems in order to ascertain the actual margin left after the warning had been given before the aircraft stalled. On this particular flight, the aircraft was being operated with its centre of gravity towards its aft limit.

Shortly after 18:30, the pilot reported that the aircraft was in a "superstall". At the time, the aircraft was observed to be configured for landing. It was at an altitude of 10,000 feet (3,000 m). The nose was seen to pitch up by 30 to 40° before the aircraft turned to port, followed by the starboard wing dropping. Although full power was applied, the aircraft entered into a flat spin, and crashed at Felthorpe, killing all on board. It was not fitted with an anti-spin parachute. The site of the accident was in a field adjacent to Felthorpe Airfield.

== Investigation ==
The Accidents Investigation Branch opened an inquiry into the accident. The investigation found that accident was the result of the pilot delaying recovery manoeuvres for too long, thereby allowing the aircraft to enter a deep stall from which it was impossible to recover.

== See also ==
- 1963 BAC One-Eleven test crash
- British European Airways Flight 548

== Sources ==
- Middleton, Don (1985). Test Pilots. London: Guild Publishing.
- Deep Stall Disaster Flight International, 20 November 1968 p909-910
