= Mike Lithgow =

British aviator and test pilot (1920–1963)

Michael John "Mike" Lithgow
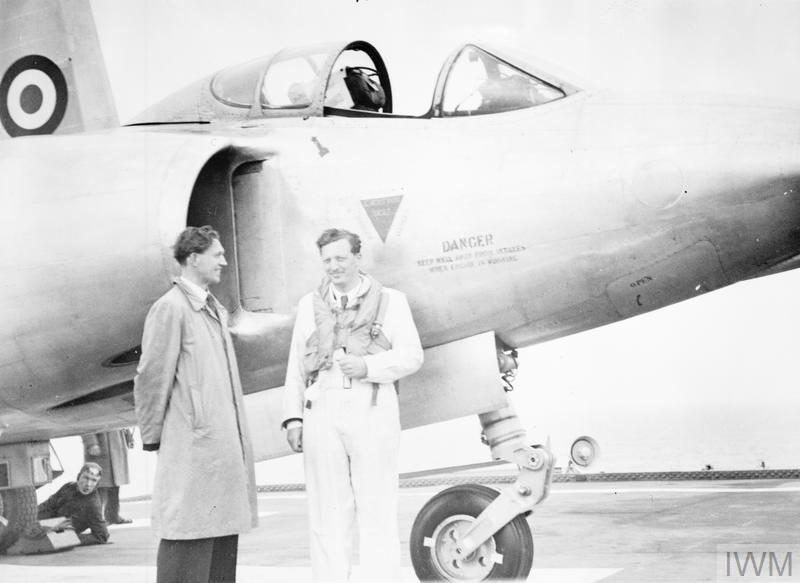
- Lithgow beside the new Vickers Supermarine 508 twin jet experimental naval fighter. 24 May 1952
- Born: 30 August 1920
- Died: 22 October 1963 (aged 43); Chicklade, Wiltshire, England
- Military career
- Allegiance: United Kingdom
- Branch: Royal Navy
- Service years: 1939–1945
- Rank: Lieutenant Commander
- Conflicts: World War II
- Awards: OBE

Michael John Lithgow, OBE (30 August 1920 – 22 October 1963) was a British aviator and chief test pilot for Vickers Supermarine who became the holder of the World Absolute Air Speed Record in 1953 flying a Supermarine Swift. He died when the prototype BAC One-Eleven airliner crashed in 1963.

== Early life ==
Mike Lithgow was born on 30 August 1920 and educated at Cheltenham College.

== Second World War ==
Lithgow was a member of the Fleet Air Arm from March 1939 – December 1945. As a Lieutenant Commander on HMS Ark Royal, he flew Swordfish torpedo bombers and was one of the pilots attacking the German battleship Bismarck.

Later in the war, while serving on HMS Formidable in the Indian Ocean, Lithgow's Fairey Albacore crashed into the sea after suffering engine failure on a night-flying exercise. He and the other crew of the aircraft were saved when Admiral James Somerville ordered the carrier to turn around and carry out a search for them.

== Test pilot ==
World Air Speed Record diploma

He retired from the Royal Navy and moved to Vickers Supermarine as a test pilot in January 1946 and became the company's chief test pilot two years later.

In September 1946, he took part in the Lympne high speed air race, flying a Supermarine Seafang, competing against Bill Humble in a Hawker Fury, Geoffrey de Havilland in a D.H. Vampire and G.H Pike in a D.H. Hornet

On 26 September 1953, flying the Supermarine Swift F.4 prototype, WK198, Lithgow broke the World Air Speed Record near Tripoli in Libya, reaching a speed of 735.7 mph (1184 km/h). He was awarded the Gold Medal of the Royal Aero Club and the Geoffrey de Havilland Trophy in 1953

He did extensive test flying on the Supermarine Attacker, Swift, Scimitar and later the Vickers Vanguard and BAC One-Eleven.

Lithgow died test flying the prototype BAC One-Eleven G-ASHG from Wisley airfield on 22 October 1963 when during stall tests the aircraft entered a deep stall and crashed near Chicklade, Wiltshire. Six other BAC flight test team members were also killed.
