= Chicklade =

Village in Wiltshire, England

Coordinates: 51.110°N 2.127°W

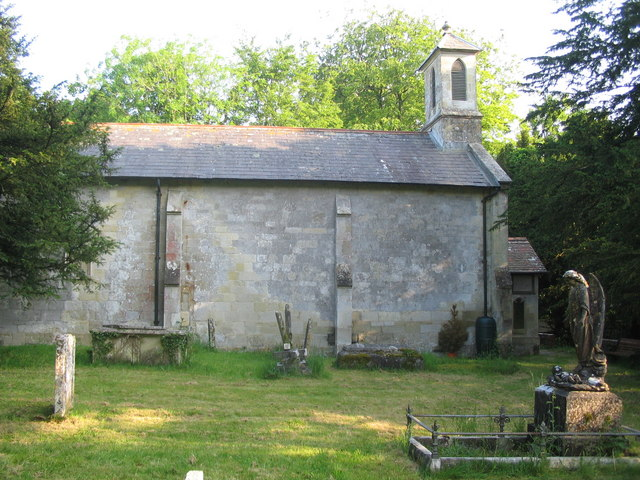
- All Saints' parish church

- Location within Wiltshire
- Population: 75 (2011 Census)
- OS grid reference: ST911345
- Civil parish: Chicklade
- Unitary authority: Wiltshire
- Ceremonial county: Wiltshire
- Region: South West
- Country: England
- Sovereign state: United Kingdom
- Post town: Salisbury
- Postcode district: SP3
- Dialling code: 01747
- Police: Wiltshire
- Fire: Dorset and Wiltshire
- Ambulance: South Western
- UK Parliament: Salisbury

Chicklade is a small village and civil parish in Wiltshire, South West England. The village is on the A303 road, about 7 miles (11 km) south of Warminster. The parish includes the hamlet of Upper Pertwood.

The Great Ridge Wood, formerly also known as Chicklade Wood, is less than a mile north of the village, just over the parish boundary.

== Etymology ==
The name Chicklade is first attested in a charter from between 901 and 924, as Cytlid, later forms including Chikelaď (1199), Ciclet (1210–12), Ciklet (1242), and Chikelade (1281). Although the etymology of Chicklade is uncertain, its first syllable is agreed to originate in the Common Brittonic word that survives in modern Welsh as coed ("woodland").

== History ==
John Marius Wilson's Imperial Gazetteer of England and Wales (1870–72) describes Chicklade as follows:

CHICKLADE, a parish in Tisbury district, Wilts; 1¼ mile N by E of Hindon, and 5 S by-W of Heytesbury r. station. Post town, Hindon, under Salisbury. Acres, 1,039. Real property, with Hindon, Berwick-St. Leonard, and Fonthill-Gifford, £5,111. Pop., 143. Houses, 23. The property is divided among a few. The surface is hilly. The living is a rectory in the diocese of Salisbury. Value, £230. Patron, the Marquis of Bath. The church is good.

On 22 October 1963 the prototype BAC One-Eleven aircraft G-ASHG flown by Mike Lithgow entered a deep stall and crashed near Chicklade, killing all seven crew. (See 1963 BAC One-Eleven test crash)

== Churches ==
The Church of England parish church of All Saints was built in 1832 to designs in 12th-century style by J.B. Papworth. It stands on the site of a 12th-century church.

The poet William Lisle Bowles was Vicar of Chicklade 1792–97.

Pertwood also had a 12th-century church, St Peter's, which was rebuilt in 1872. The ecclesiastical parish of Pertwood was separate until 1899 when it was united with Chicklade, then in 1921, Chicklade with Pertwood was united with Hindon parish. The church at Pertwood was declared redundant in 1972.

Parish registers for Chicklade survive from 1722 and are kept in the Wiltshire and Swindon Archives.

== Local government ==
The civil parish does not elect a parish council. Instead the first tier of local government is a parish meeting, which all electors are entitled to attend. The parish is in the area of Wiltshire Council unitary authority, which is responsible for all significant local government functions.

== Sources and further reading ==
- Freeman, Jane; Stevenson, Janet H. (1987). "Parishes: Chicklade". In Crowley, D. A. (ed.). A History of the County of Wiltshire, Volume 13. Victoria County History. University of London. pp. 105–114 – via British History Online.
- Wilson, John Marius (1870–1872). Imperial Gazetteer of England and Wales. Vol. 1. London & Edinburgh: A Fullarton & Co. p. 425.
