= Tribal Gathering =

British electronic dance music festival

- Tribal Gathering 1995 album cover
- Genre: Techno, house and drum and bass
- Years active: 1993–2004
- Founders: Paul Shurey, Rob Vega

Tribal Gathering is the original British electronic dance music festival that between 1993 and 2004 catered for different types of dance music cultures such as techno, house and drum & bass.

== History ==
The original promoters of Universe (Paul Shurey, Rob Vega and former Bath Rugby Captain Roger Spurrell, Tennant and Jill Trick) had been organising events since the heady days of 1989 when raves such as Sunrise, Raindance and Perception were in their pomp. They wanted to organise an event to bring together the different sub-cultures of the dance world and also to have a festival feel to it. The company BTY Limited launched the Universe brand which organised the following UK dance parties:

- Universe, 30 August 1991
- In2Orbit, 1 May 1992
- Adventures on the Pleasure Planet, 19 June 1992
- Mind, Body, Soul and The Universe, 11 September 1992
- Tribal Gathering, 30 April 1993
- Time Machine, 4 June 1993
- Big Love, 30 August 1993

BTY Limited ceased trading in 1993 following considerable investment in trying to bring the UK dance party scene to San Francisco in partnership with Bill Graham Presents. In late 1993, Shurey met Ian Jenkinson and formed the United States of Mind Company, and they subsequently developed a weekly techno club night known as Final Frontier, which became part of Universe’s central musical programming during the mid-1990s and was a break from the past events and was the template for Tribal Gathering moving forward.

The first Tribal Gathering took place Friday 30 April 1993 at Lower Pertwood Farm near Warminster, Wiltshire. 25,000 attended to see acts such as Laurent Garnier, Carl Cox, Aphex Twin, DiY Sound System and Pete Tong.

In March 1994 Ian Jenkinson and Paul Shurey became partners and they opened the legendary London night club 'Final Frontier', at Club UK in Wandsworth. Weekly nights ran for several years, relocating in 1997 to the Complex Club in Islington. Each week featured numerous headline djs and live acts, the likes of which had never been seen before. A proud moment for the promoters was when 'Final Frontier' was voted number 5 in Musik Magazines top 50 clubs of all time, just behind Studio 54, Dorian Gray, Paradise Garage and Limelight. Final Frontier at Club UK was consistently listed by Time Out as one of the essential clubs to visit in London. It marked the starting point of a more cultural, underground sound, with Jenkinson’s input helping to shape a forward-thinking musical direction. The night featured a regular roster of globally influential resident DJs including Laurent Garnier, Jeff Mills, Gayle San, Andrew Weatherall, Billy Nasty, Sven Väth, The Chemical Brothers, and DJ Dag.

By blending the distinct sounds of Detroit, Frankfurt, Berlin, and London, Final Frontier helped establish a new template for UK electronic music. This approach directly informed the evolution of Tribal Gathering from 1994–1997, transforming it from a rave into a fully realised electronic music festival that combined DJs with live artists and a broader underground cultural identity.

Also in 1993 the Universe - World Techno Tribe compilation CD was released in Europe on Rising High Records, on Sony Music in Japan and Moonshine Music in the USA. Compiled and mixed by Mr Oz it reached number 4 in the Gallup album charts. Subsequent CDs were later released on MMS records and FFRR.

The Criminal Justice Bill of 1994 discouraged massive outdoor raves. In 1994 Tribal Gathering moved to Munich, Germany and partnered with Jens Maspfuhl from Frankfurt Beat Records/Sony. Staged at the decommissioned Munich-Riem Airport it featured artists such as The Prodigy or Underworld.

In 1995 Shurey and Jenkinson teamed up with the Mean Fiddler organisation to organise the first all night legal festival. Tribal Gathering 95 took place in May 1995 and was the first legal all night event in the UK, at Otmoor Park, Beckley, Oxfordshire. Headline acts included The Prodigy, Orbital and Moby.

The 1996 version of the Tribal Gathering took place in June at Luton Hoo, Bedfordshire with 30,000 turning up to see sets by Underworld, Leftfield, The Chemical Brothers, Black Grape, Goldie, Daft Punk and others. And in various magazines and media was referred to as the greatest ever electronic music festival due to the line-up and political landscape in the UK at this time

In 1996, Shurey and Jenkinson successfully launched Island Universe at Three Mills Island in East London on New Year’s Eve. Building on that momentum, they followed in 1997 with Mount Universe at London’s Alexandra Palace on New Years Eve — the venue’s first-ever all-night event. The lineup featured some of the most influential artists of the era, including Sven Väth, Gayle San, Jeff Mills, Sasha & Digweed, The Chemical Brothers, James Lavelle, and Orbital (live).

In 1997, at Luton Hoo, Kraftwerk were the headliners of the festival, playing for the first time in the UK since 1992. The show was a monumental success, even though there was no new material released since The Mix.

From 1994 Universe ran the infamous London club night Final Frontier at Club UK, three rooms of electronic music in varying form and style. Acid, Techno, Tribal, Trance and House. Their DJ lineups were nothing short of phenomenal, each Friday over four years resident DJ's Gayle San, Tin Tin, Mr Oz, Murf and Matt Tangent played alongside nearly every 'A' list DJ from the UK, EU and around The Globe! After 4 years at Club UK the Universe Crew moved from Wandsworth and moved to Islington and rebranded from Final Frontier to Voyager, which was held at Complex Club, which was previously the home of the AWOL Drum and Bass events.

By 1998, the Tribal Gathering name had grown into a brand. There were albums, a TV show and plans to establish events worldwide in the pipeline. However their things did not go to schedule and the 1998 event did not take place due to Universe and Mean Fiddler's legal battle over the Tribal Gathering name.

In 1999 David Vincent bought the Tribal Gathering name from Paul Shurey and Ian Jenkinson, with the aim of bringing the event back to life.

The Tribal Gathering name was revived in 2000 at the legendary Sankeys Soap club, Manchester. The weekly legendary "Tribal Sessions" club night took place at Sankeys with DJs generally playing House, Techno, Tech-house, Acid House & Breaks & Beats. Tribal Sessions djs included Richie Hawtin, Jeff Mills, Carl Cox, Sasha, Steve Lawler, Laurent Garnier and many others. Tribal Sessions won many awards from Mixmag best club of the year 2004. There was also 2 exhibitions in Manchester Museum of Science and Industry for the brand for providing significant culture for the city of Manchester.

In 2002 Tribal Gathering returned as a weekender at Southport Pontins to a sell-out 5,000 capacity crowd with DJs Sasha, Dave Clarke, Deep Dish, Derrick Carter, Erol Alkan amongst others performing with many rave reviews. There was a follow-up event in November 2003.

In 2003 Tribal Gathering held the first legal warehouse party for over 10 years in a "secret" Manchester location, which turned out to be a warehouse previously used as a set for the movie 24 Hour Party People, which was decorated to replicate The Haçienda nightclub. 12,000 people attended where artistes like Groove Armada, Laurent Garnier, Jeff Mills, Deep Dish appeared. The event won best event of the year 2003 with Mixmag and was voted second best party ever by Mixmag in 2004.

In 2004 Tribal Gathering held a two-day warehouse party in a Manchester City Centre in association with the Hacienda with DJs Groove Armada, Graeme Park and Mike Pickering.

In July 2005, a Tribal Gathering festival was organised, in aid of the war victims in Darfur, Sudan, to take place again at Luton Hoo but it was cancelled due to the terrorist attacks that took place on 7 July in London.

== See also ==
- List of electronic music festivals
