= Green Gathering =

Coordinates: 51°39′31″N 2°41′09″W

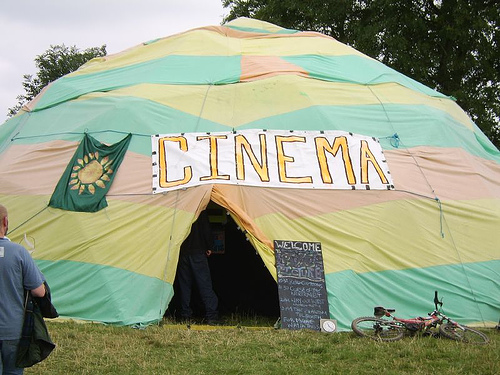
Cinema tent at the 2006 Big Green Gathering

The Green Gathering, formerly known as the Big Green Gathering is a festival with an environmental and social justice focus, including workshops and talks on permaculture, politics, ecology and crafts, as well as art, live music and spoken word performances. The first Big Green Gathering was held in 1994 and the festival is currently held in Chepstow, Monmouthshire although it has previously been held in various locations in Somerset and Wiltshire, England.

== History ==
The event grew from the Green Fields area of the Glastonbury Festival. And in their turn, the Green Fields at Glastonbury Festival had evolved from an earlier series of Green Gatherings held from the late 1970s until 1983 at two Somerset venues, some being formally associated with the Ecology Party, as the UK Green Party was then named.

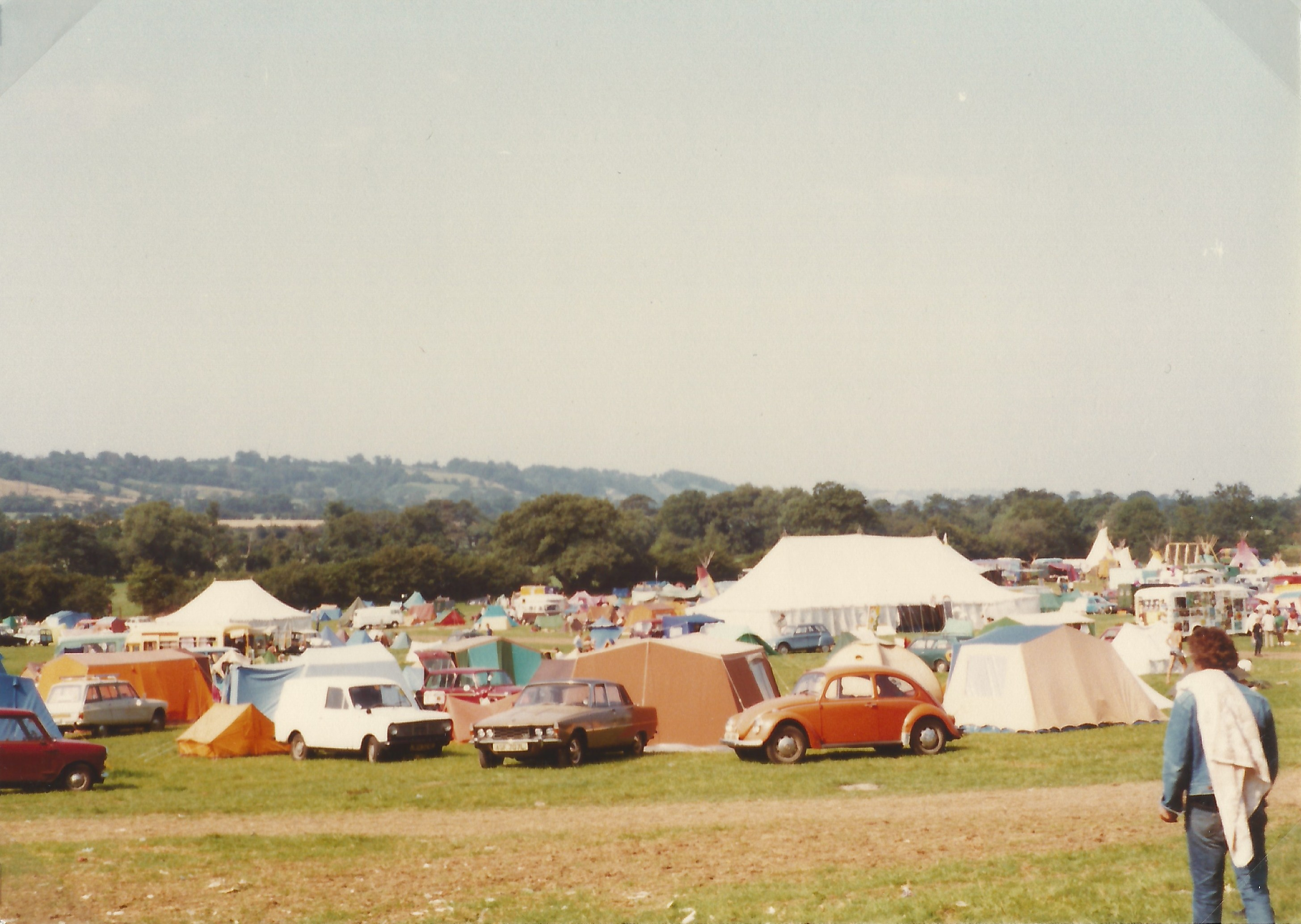
The camp at the Green Gathering, Pilton nr Glastonbury 29-7-1982

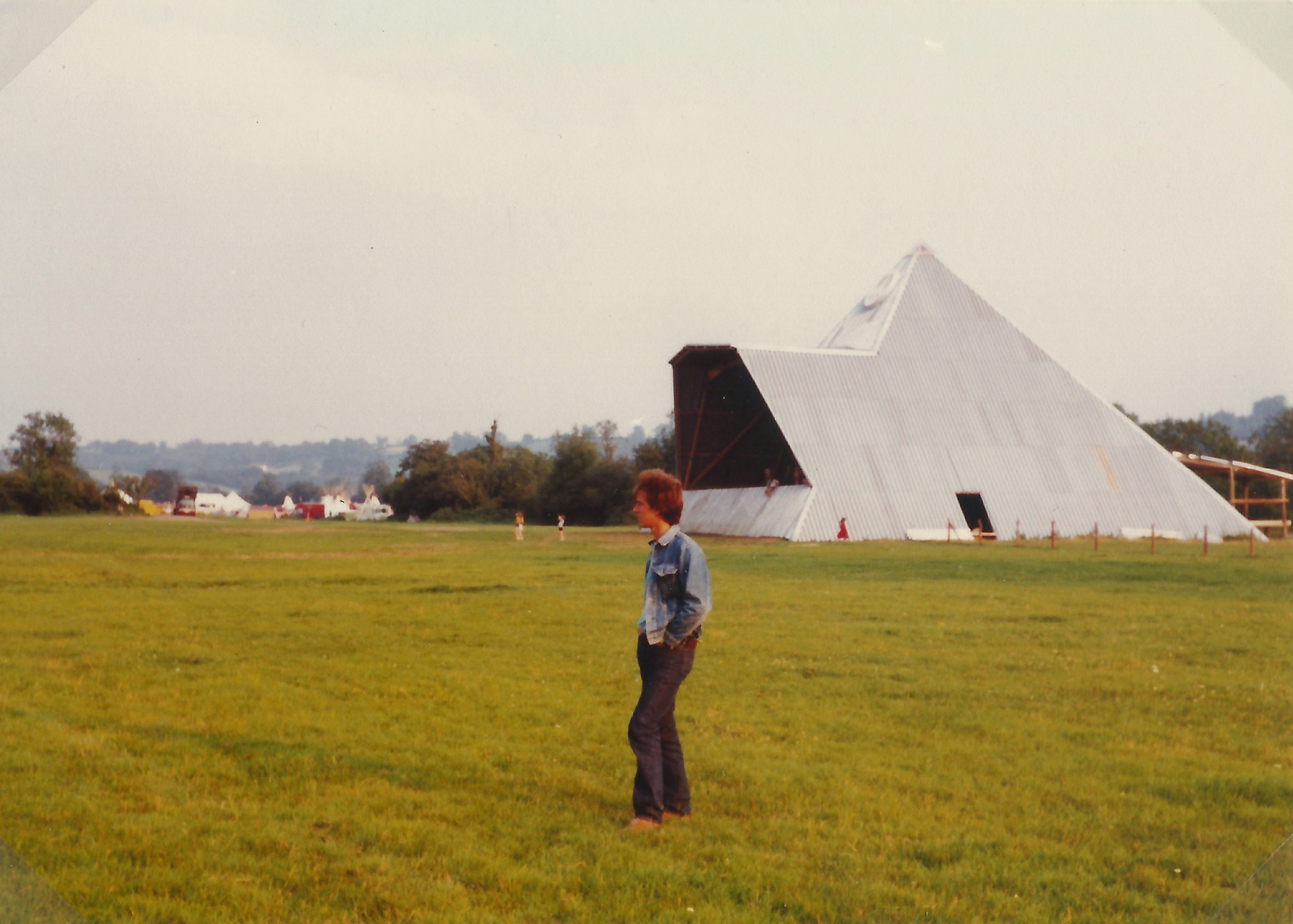
Pyramid stage at Worthy Farm, Pilton, during Green Gathering 27-7-1982

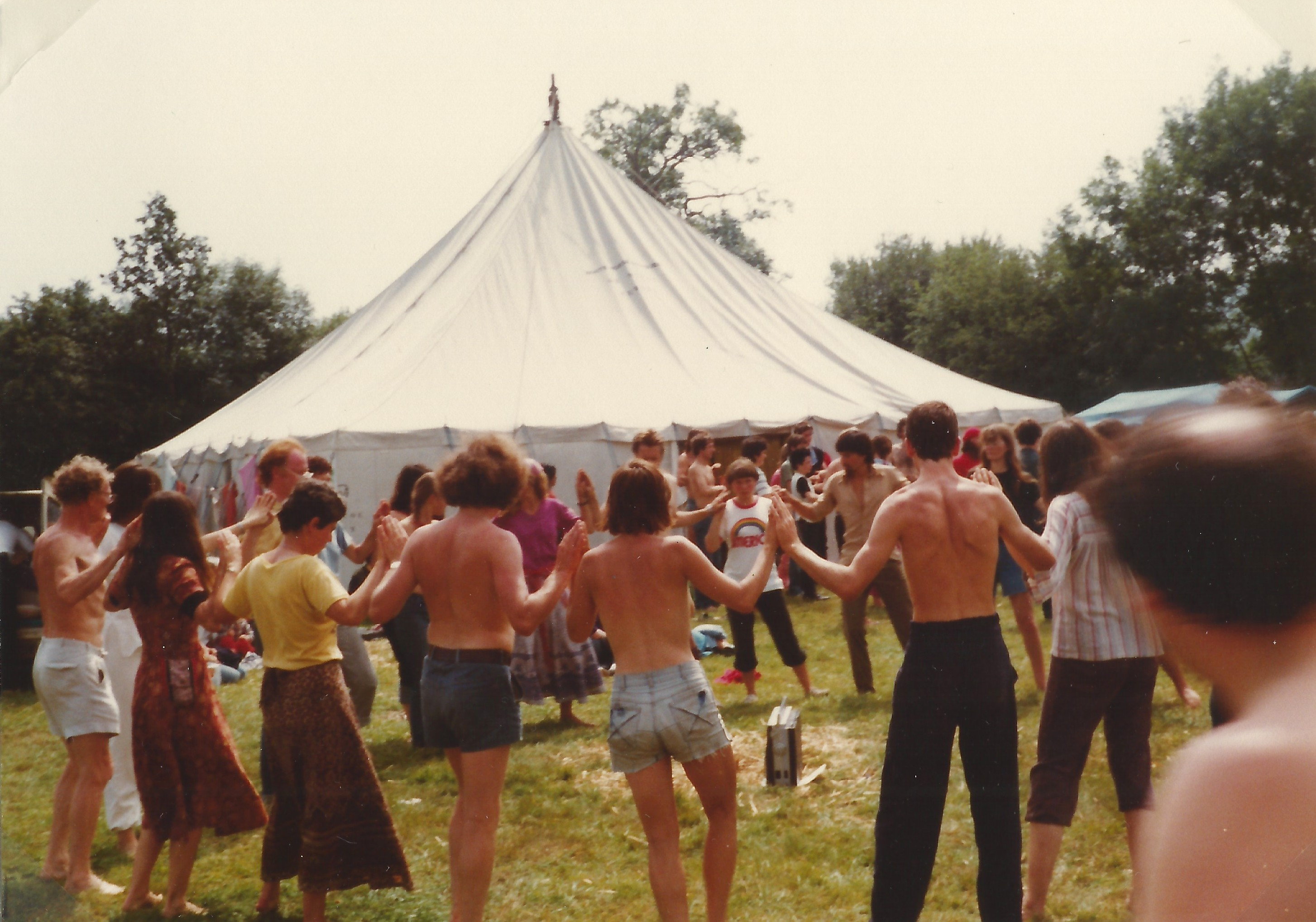
Dancing with the Findhorn Community at the Green Gathering 31-07-1982

The first Big Green Gathering was held in 1994 at Watchfield, north east of Swindon. In 1995, the event moved to a site at Lower Pertwood Farm, about 10 miles (16 km) south of Warminster, in Wiltshire, and the event was repeated at that site in 1996, 1997, 1998 and 2000. The next Green Gathering took place in 2002 at Winchester Farm on the Somerset Levels in Cheddar. In 2003, 2005, 2006 and 2007 the BGG was held at Fernhill Farm, a 160-acre (65 hectare) site which can hold up to 20,000 visitors, in the Mendip Hills. No festival was held in 2008.

In 2009 the festival was scheduled to return to Fernhill Farm, 29 July to 2 August. Mendip council granted a licence at the end of June. According to The Guardian: "On 23 July, the organisers were suddenly confronted with a list of demands that they believed they had already met". Two days before it was due to open, the organisers surrendered their licence to hold the event, following the threat of injunction proceedings in the High Court by Mendip District Council, supported by Avon and Somerset Police. The Guardian stated: "Festival directors accused the police of taking a politically motivated decision to shut down the festival..." and quoted the police as saying "The organisers voluntarily surrendered their licence... therefore it was their decision to cancel, not ours." The Guardian article further stated "The Big Green Gathering ... has been running in its present form since 1994 without complaints about public safety or crime". Organisers were able to arrange ticket swaps but not refunds for all ticket holders.

The event re-launched as 'The Green Gathering' in 2011 at Piercefield Park, near Chepstow in the Wye Valley where it has run annually since.

At the UK Festival Awards 2017, The Green Gathering was presented with the top UK accolade for green events – The Greener Festival Award, for outstanding commitment to reducing its environmental impact and creating positive social impact. Further national and international awards followed in 2018 and 2019.

== Events ==
The Green Gathering is described by its organisers as being "A festival beyond hedonism - a place to party, then wake up the next morning and put the world to rights with your new mates from the night before."

In 2015, an eFestivals Review described The Green Gathering as "An inspiring modern festival with a refreshing old school edge".

Many environmental and social justice groups such as Greenpeace, Green and Black Cross (GBC was founded in November 2010 to provide legal support for protests against the government’s wave of massive spending cuts.), Refugee Community Kitchen and Reclaim The Power (Reclaim the Power is a UK based direct action network fighting for social, environmental and economic justice.) have had a presence at the festival. The Gathering has pioneered renewable energy with every Gathering being powered by wind, sun and people.

Between 2011 and 2019, Green MEP and economist Molly Scott Cato, Baronness Jenny Jones, Green Party leader Natalie Bennett and Green MP Caroline Lucas shared the bill in the festival's Speakers' Forum with radical activist Ewa Jasiewicz, Guardian journalist Rob Evans, Radical Routes co-operators, anti-GM campaigner Hector Christie and Simon Fairlie, editor of The Land magazine - amongst many others.

On the festival site there are several distinct areas including:

- Permaculture Zone
- Crafts Area
- Campaigns Field
- Low Impact Village
- Healing Field
- Ethical Markets
- Assisted Camping
- An extensive Kids Area

Although The Green Gathering is not primarily a music festival, live music is performed across several small stages and venues. Past performers have included 3 Daft Monkeys, Banco de Gaia, Nik Turner, Martha Tilston, Radical Dance Faction, Seize The Day and Transglobal Underground.
