= 1963 BAC One-Eleven test crash =

Aviation accident in Wiltshire, England

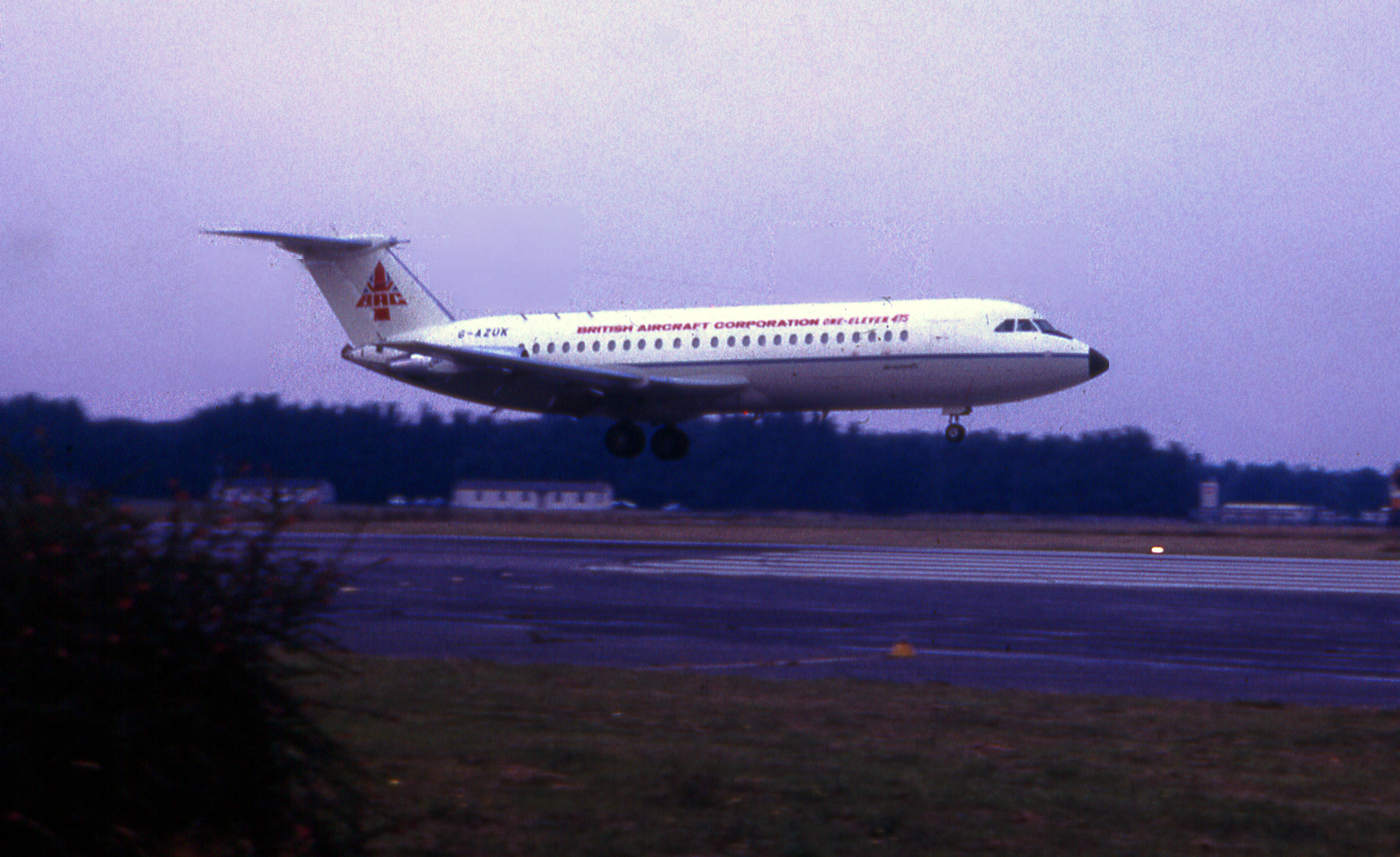
- A BAC 1-11 in British Aircraft Corporation livery similar to the accident aircraft.

Accident
- Date: 22 October 1963
- Summary: Deep stall
- Site: Near Chicklade, Wiltshire, England, United Kingdom; 51.1252672°N 2.1358360°W

Aircraft
- Aircraft type: BAC One-Eleven 200AB
- Operator: British Aircraft Corporation
- Registration: G-ASHG
- Flight origin: Wisley Airfield, Surrey, United Kingdom
- Stopover: Wisley Airfield, Surrey, United Kingdom
- Occupants: 7
- Crew: 7
- Fatalities: 7
- Survivors: 0

The 1963 BAC One-Eleven test crash was a fatal accident of a British Aircraft Corporation prototype aircraft on 22 October 1963, near Chicklade in Wiltshire, England while it was undertaking a test flight. All seven crew members on board the BAC One-Eleven were killed.

== Accident ==
The accident occurred during a test flight of the first prototype BAC One-Eleven (registration G-ASHG) which had taken off from Wisley Airfield with seven crew on board, captained by Mike Lithgow. The aircraft was on its fifth test flight to assess stability and handling characteristics during the approach to—and recovery from—a stall with the centre of gravity in varying positions. From an altitude of 16,000 feet (4,900 m) and with the flaps extended 8°, the aircraft entered a stable stall and descended at a high rate in a horizontal attitude, eventually striking the ground with very little forward speed. The aircraft broke up on impact at Cratt Hill, near Chicklade, a small village in southern Wiltshire and caught fire, killing all seven crew on board.

The aircraft was on its fifth stalling test of the day, and the crash occurred 23 minutes after takeoff from Wisley. The crew were Lt. Cdr. M J Lithgow OBE, Chief Test Pilot; Capt. R Rymer (Test Pilot); B J Prior (Aerodynamicist); C J Webb (Designer); R A F Wright (Senior Observer); G R Poulter (Observer) and D J Clark (Observer).

== Cause ==
The cause of the accident was the aircraft entering a stable stalled condition, recovery from which was impossible due to the wings blocking the airflow over the elevators on the tail. This was the first accident to be attributed to the phenomenon known as deep stall, peculiar to rear engine T-tailed aircraft.

== Aftermath ==
Once the condition of deep stall was recognised, relatively simple preventative measures were introduced, including stick-shakers indicating an approaching stall and stick-pushers which automatically operate the elevators and physically lower the nose before the stall is reached, while the tailplane and pitch controls are still effective.

== Memorial ==
In October 2013 a stone memorial was dedicated at the crash site, listing the seven victims. The ceremony was attended by the CO of the Royal Navy Historic Flight; Lord Margadale (the owner of the land); and families of the crew members. The memorial bears a quotation from the annotation of the 1817 edition of The Rime of the Ancient Mariner, a poem by Samuel Taylor Coleridge: '...and everywhere the blue sky belongs to them and is their appointed rest and their native country.'

== See also ==
- 1966 Felthorpe Trident crash
- British European Airways Flight 548
