= Pertwood =

Coordinates: 51.11°N 2.17°W

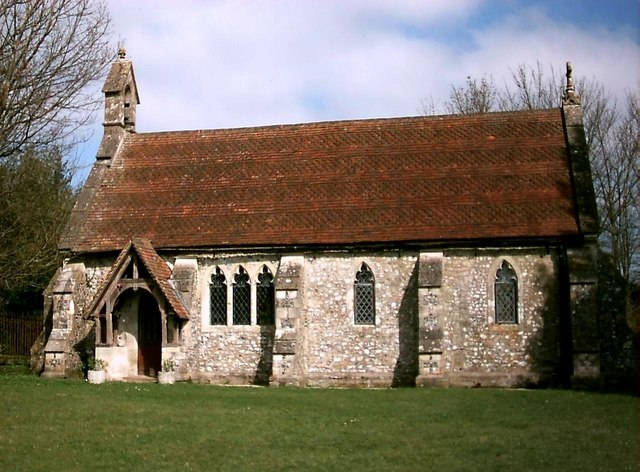
- St. Peter's Church, Higher Pertwood

- Location within Wiltshire
- Population: 19
- OS grid reference: ST888357
- Unitary authority: Wiltshire
- Ceremonial county: Wiltshire
- Region: South West
- Country: England
- Sovereign state: United Kingdom
- Post town: Warminster
- Postcode district: BA12
- Police: Wiltshire
- Fire: Dorset and Wiltshire
- Ambulance: South Western

Pertwood is an ancient settlement and former civil parish, near Warminster in the county of Wiltshire in the west of England. Its land and houses now lie in the parishes of Brixton Deverill, East Knoyle, Sutton Veny and Chicklade, and have fewer than twenty inhabitants.

The settlements are close together at Upper Pertwood (also called Higher Pertwood) and Lower Pertwood. Higher Pertwood is now Pertwood Manor Farm, while Lower Pertwood is Pertwood Organic Farm.

== History ==
Before the Norman Conquest, the manor of Pertwood was held by a man named Wlward. At the Domesday survey of 1086, it was held by Geoffrey de Mowbray, Bishop of Coutances, and contained two hides, of which one and a half were in demesne and the rest was held of the manor by tenants. Two villeins, three bordars, one plough, twenty acres of pasture and four of woodland were recorded. Pertwood later became a manor of the Earls of Gloucester, which it remained until the early 15th century.

Pertwood Down, on high ground to the west of Pertwood, has several barrows and traces of Celtic field systems, but all such remains lie outside the area of the former parish.

Just to the north of Lower Pertwood Farm, the Romans, in building a straight road, unusually diverted their road around an ancient tumulus instead of going through it. In 1829, the Roman road near Pertwood was described as "still remarkably perfect".

In 1808, a topographer wrote of Pertwood that it was "...a decayed parish in the hundred of Warminster... containing 2 houses and 15 inhabitants".

The Revd John Marius Wilson's Imperial Gazetteer of England and Wales (1870–1872) said of Pertwood:

PERTWOOD, a parish in Mere district, Wilts; on the Roman road to Old Sarum, 2 miles N W of Hindon, and 5½ N W of Tisbury r. station. Post-town, Hindon, under Salisbury. Acres, 450. Rated property, £480. Pop., 30. Houses, 5. The property is all in one estate. The living is a rectory in the diocese of Salisbury. Value, £56. Patron, Mrs. Seymour. The church is good.

In 1885 the parish of Pertwood was extinguished, with its southern part being added to East Knoyle, its northern part to Sutton Veny.

A detailed parish history was published in 1965 by the Wiltshire Victoria County History in its volume 8. That volume recounts the owners of the manor, including John Benett of Pythouse (from 1805 to 1810) and Percy Wyndham (followed by his son and grandson, in all 1877 to 1919).

Colonel Scrope Egerton owned Pertwood Manor Farm from 1945 until his death in 1986; he was married to Marjorie, a sister of John Morrison, 1st Baron Margadale, owner of the Fonthill House estate. Recent owners of Lower Pertwood are Mark Houghton-Brown (1982 to 2006) and Wilfred Mole (from 2006).

In April 1993, the Tribal Gathering music festival took place at Pertwood, and in 1995, 1996, 1997, 1998, and 2000 it was the site of the Big Green Gathering.

== Church ==
The former Church of England parish church, which stands at Upper or Higher Pertwood, is called St Peter's. It was originally a small 12th-century stone building entered by a round-headed door on its south side, but in about 1812 it was "restored" by the then lord of the manor, Richard Ricward, so that by 1822 there was nothing ancient to be seen, except one stoop. In the restored church a round-headed arch lay between the chancel and the nave. In 1872 the church was rebuilt in flint, dressed with stone, with a single church bell in a small structure over the roof at the western end. This small building contains a nave, a chancel, and a north aisle. In 1908 the bowl of a 14th-century font was found buried nearby and was returned to the church.

Pertwood was a separate church parish until 1899, when the benefice was held by the rector of Chicklade. In 1921, Chicklade with Pertwood was united with the parish of Hindon.

The Victorian church became derelict and was closed in 1968, then declared redundant in 1972. However, the building was later restored.

== Present day ==
Upper Pertwood, on high downland in the southern half of the former parish, is approached by a drive from the A350 road and consists of the original manor house, known as Manor Farm, five farm cottages, and other buildings, all now in the parish of Chicklade.

About one mile away on the other side of the A350 is Lower Pertwood, now in Brixton Deverill, the heart of a large organic farm of 2,100 acres (8.5 km^{2}) called Lower Pertwood Farm or Pertwood Organic Farm. The organic farming model was introduced by Mark Houghton Brown, largely to conserve the thin soil, and was continued by him until 2005 and thereafter by new owners. The farm is managed under Natural England's Higher Level Stewardship scheme. Apart from the farmhouse and farm buildings, there are six cottages at Lower Pertwood, of which numbers 1, 2, 3, and 4 no longer belong to the farm.

== Governance ==
Almost all local government functions are carried out by Wiltshire Council, a unitary authority. For Westminster elections, Upper Pertwood is in the Salisbury constituency while Lower Pertwood is in South West Wiltshire.

== Notable people ==
In 1560, Sir John Mervyn of Pertwood was High Sheriff of Wiltshire.

Lancelot Morehouse, a 17th-century Rector of Pertwood, has been described as John Aubrey's "most familiar learned acquaintance".

Percy Scawen Wyndham (1835–1911), a younger son of the first Lord Leconfield, owned Pertwood from 1877 until his death in 1911. He was a soldier, Conservative politician, antiquarian, and intellectual, one of the founding members of the Souls.
