= Stick pusher =

Aircraft anti-stall device

A stick pusher is a device installed in some fixed-wing aircraft to prevent the aircraft from entering an aerodynamic stall. Some large fixed-wing aircraft display poor post-stall handling characteristics or are vulnerable to deep stall. To prevent such an aircraft approaching the stall the aircraft designer may install a hydraulic or electro-mechanical device that pushes forward on the elevator control system whenever the aircraft's angle of attack reaches the predetermined value, and then ceases to push when the angle of attack falls sufficiently. A system for this purpose is known as a stick pusher.

The safety requirements applicable to fixed-wing aircraft in the transport category, and also to many military aircraft, are relatively demanding in the area of pre-stall handling qualities and stall recovery. Some of these aircraft are unable to comply with these safety requirements relying solely on the natural aerodynamic qualities of the aircraft. In order to comply with regulatory requirements, aircraft designers may opt to install a system that will constantly monitor the critical parameters and will automatically activate to reduce the angle of attack when necessary to avoid a stall. The critical parameters include the angle of attack, airspeed, wing flap setting and load factor. Action by the pilot is not required to recognise the problem or react to it.

== History ==
In October 1963, a BAC One-Eleven airliner was lost after having crashed during a stall test. The pilots pushed the T-tailed plane past the limits of stall recovery and entered a deep stall state, in which the disturbed air from the stalled wing had rendered the elevator ineffective, directly leading to a loss of control and crash. As a consequence of the crash, a combined stick shaker/pusher system was installed in all production One-Eleven airliners. A wider consequence of the incident was a new design requirement related to the pilot's ability to identify and overcome stall conditions; the design of a Transport category aircraft that fails to comply with the specifics of this requirement may be acceptable if the aircraft is equipped with a stick pusher.

Following the crash of American Airlines Flight 191 on 25 May 1979, the Federal Aviation Administration (FAA) issued an airworthiness directive, which mandated the installation and operation of stick shakers on both sets of flight controls on most models of the McDonnell Douglas DC-10, a trijet airliner. In addition to regulatory pressure, various aircraft manufacturers have endeavoured to devise their own improved stall protection systems, many of which have included the stick shaker. The American aerospace company Boeing had designed and integrated stall warning systems into numerous aircraft that it has produced.

According to aerospace periodical Flying, the traditional stick pusher arrangement was established by Boeing. The Seattle Times has observed that Boeing had historically avoided the integration of stick pushers upon many of its aircraft as matter of flying philosophy to avoid overly-automating actions. Amongst other aircraft Boeing were involved in the development of, the 300 Series of the De Havilland Canada Dash 8 regional airliner was equipped with this system.

There are several variations and functionality differences amongst the stick pushers installed in different aircraft. Textron Aviation developed their own arrangement for its Citation Longitude business jet, opting to automate the aircraft's augmented pusher system via its integration with the computerised autopilot, thus eliminating the need to involve any electro-mechanical mechanisms. Accordingly, Textron's pusher function has the autopilot servo push the nose down to reduce the angle of attack. A relatively similar stall warning arrangement has been adopted on the Pilatus PC-24 light business jet. Bombardier Aviation also incorporated a stick pusher onto their Challenger 600 family of business jets.

While not included in earlier models of the aircraft, Lockheed Martin chose to include a stick pusher in the new generation C-130J Super Hercules transport plane, which suffered from unexpected stall characteristics that had delayed the type's entry into service and could not be resolved via multiple aerodynamic alterations. The Embraer ERJ family has been equipped with a stick pusher, despite the reportedly completion of all stall tests without incident. In Europe, airliners not known for possessing deep-stall characteristics, such as the McDonnell Douglas MD-80 narrowbody airliner, have been routinely required to be outfitted with stick pushers even where other regulatory bodies have found such devices unnecessary.

The principle of the stick pusher is also applicable to rotorcraft. Collective pull down devices have been made available typically as an aftermarket addition, which function in much the same way as the stick pusher. However, a stick pusher should not be confused with a stick shaker, the latter being a device that warns pilots of an imminent stall through rapid and noisy vibrations of the control yoke (the "stick").

To unfamiliar flight crew, the activation of the stick pusher can feel particularly abrupt, vigorous and alarming, but this is an intended and normal part of its functionality to ensure it takes effect before a serious stall sets in. Furthermore, aircraft designers who install stick pushers recognise that there is the risk that the device may activate erroneously when not required to do so, and thus must make suitable provisions for the flight crew to address the unwanted activation of a stick pusher. In some aircraft equipped with stick pushers, the stick pusher can be overpowered by the pilot; in some implementations, the stick pusher system can also be manually disabled by the pilot.

During the 2000s, there was a series of accidents that were attributed, at least in part, to their flight crews having made improper responses to the activation of the stick pusher. During the early 2010s, in response to this wave of accidents, the Federal Aviation Administration (FAA) issued guidance urging operators to ensure that flight crews are properly training on the use of stick pushers.

== See also ==
- Aircraft flight control system
- Dual control (aviation)
- Maneuvering Characteristics Augmentation System

=== Aircraft stall accidents ===
- British European Airways Flight 548
- Colgan Air Flight 3407 (codeshared as Continental Connection Flight 3407)
