= Stick shaker =

Mechanical device in an aircraft cockpit to warn the pilot of an imminent stall

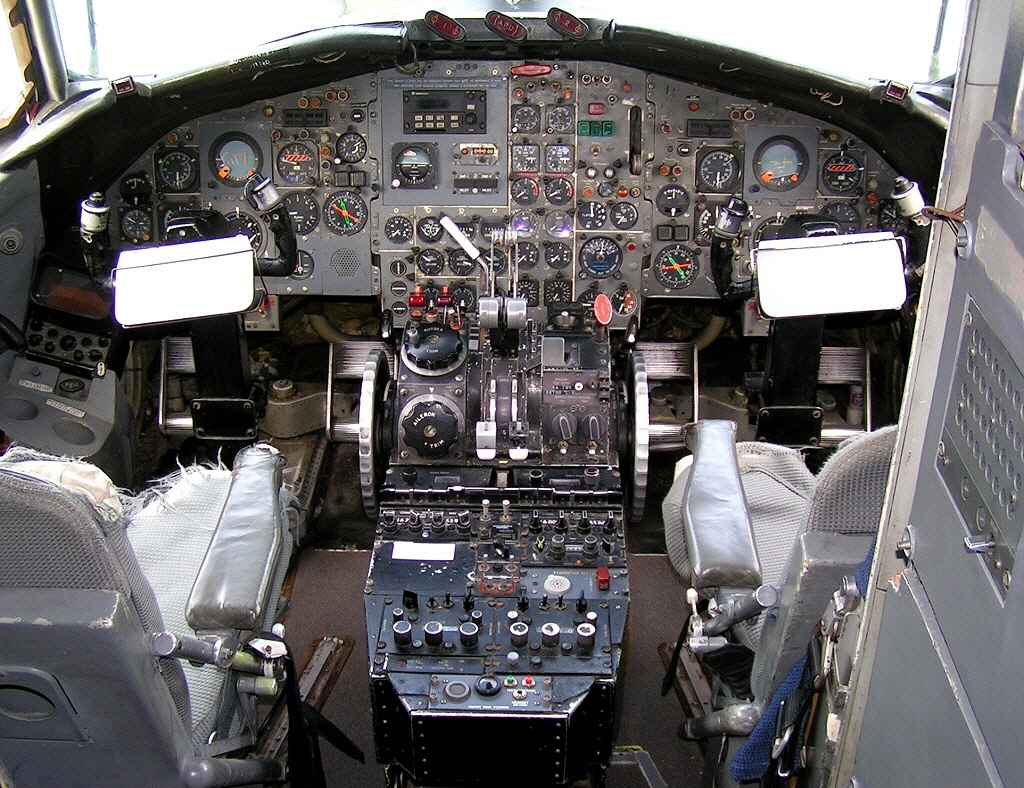
The BAC-111 cockpit includes a stick shaker/pusher following its 1963 crash

A stick shaker is a mechanical device designed to rapidly and noisily vibrate the control yoke (the "stick") of an aircraft, warning the flight crew that an imminent aerodynamic stall has been detected. It is present on the majority of large civil jet aircraft, as well as most large military planes.

The stick shaker comprises a key component of an aircraft's stall protection system. Accidents, such as the 1963 BAC One-Eleven test crash, were attributable to aerodynamic stalls and motivated aviation regulatory bodies to establish requirements for certain aircraft to be outfitted with stall protection measures, such as the stick shaker and stick pusher, to reduce such occurrences. While the stick shaker has become relatively prevalent amongst airliners and large transport aircraft, such devices are not infallible and require flight crews to be appropriately trained on their functionality and how to respond to their activation. Several instances of aircraft entering stalls have occurred even with properly functioning stick shakers, largely due to pilots reacting improperly.

== History ==
When many small aircraft approach the critical angle of attack that will result in an aerodynamic stall, the smooth flow of air over the wings is interrupted, causing turbulent airflow at the trailing edge of the wings. Depending on the aircraft size or design, that turbulent air, known as buffet, typically impacts the elevator at the rear end of the aircraft, and that in turn causes vibrations that are transmitted through control cables and can be felt by the pilot on the yoke as violent shaking. This natural shaking of the control yoke serves as an early warning to pilots that a stall is developing.

For very large aircraft, fly-by-wire aircraft and some aircraft with complex tail designs, there is no buffet effect on the control yoke, because the turbulent air does not reach the elevator, or because any movement in the elevator from buffet is not transmitted back to the control yoke. This deprives pilots of these aircraft of one of the important early warnings that they are about to enter a stall.

Boeing aircraft designers were the first to solve this problem by creating a mechanical device, which they named a stick shaker, that shakes the control yoke in a similar way to how a yoke is shaken naturally in smaller aircraft as the aircraft approaches its critical angle of attack.

Stick shakers were being developed as early as 1949.

During 1963, a BAC One-Eleven airliner was lost after having crashed during a stall test. The pilots pushed the T-tailed plane past the limits of stall recovery and entered a deep stall state, in which the disturbed air from the stalled wing had rendered the elevator ineffective, directly leading to a loss of control and crash. As a consequence of the crash, a combined stick shaker/pusher system was installed in all production BAC One-Eleven airliners. A wider consequence of the incident was the instatement of a new requirement related to the pilot's ability to identify and overcome stall conditions; a design of transport category aircraft that fails to comply with the specifics of this requirement may be acceptable if the aircraft is equipped with a stick pusher.

Following the crash of American Airlines Flight 191 on 25 May 1979, the Federal Aviation Administration (FAA) issued an airworthiness directive, which mandated the installation and operation of stick shakers on both sets of flight controls on most models of the McDonnell Douglas DC-10, a trijet airliner. Previously, only the captain's controls were equipped with a stick shaker on the DC-10; in the case of Flight 191, this single stick shaker had been disabled by a partial electrical power failure early in the accident sequence. In addition to regulatory pressure, various aircraft manufacturers have endeavoured to devise their own improved stall protection systems, many of which have included the stick shaker. The American aerospace company Boeing had designed and integrated stall warning systems into numerous aircraft that it has produced.

A wide range of aircraft have incorporated stick shakers into their cockpits. Textron Aviation's Citation Longitude business jet is one such example, as is the Pilatus PC-24 light business jet, and Bombardier Aviation's Challenger 600 family of business jets. Commercial airliners such as the newer models of the Boeing 737, the Boeing 767, and the Embraer E-Jet E2 family have also included stick shakers in the aircraft's stall protection systems.

== Function in stall protection systems ==
The stick shaker is a major element of an aircraft's stall protection system. The system is composed of fuselage or wing-mounted angle of attack (AOA) sensors that are connected to an avionics computer, which receives inputs from the AOA sensors along with a variety of other flight systems. When this data indicates an imminent stall condition, the computer actuates both the stick shaker and an auditory alert. The shaker itself is composed of an electric motor connected to a deliberately unbalanced flywheel. When actuated, the shaker induces a forceful, noisy, and entirely unmistakable shaking of the control yoke. This shaking of the control yoke matches the frequency and amplitude of the stick shaking that occurs due to airflow separation in low-speed aircraft as they approach the stall. The stick shaking is intended to act as a backup to the auditory stall alert, in cases where the flight crew may be distracted.

=== Stick pusher ===
Other stall protection systems include the stick pusher, a device that automatically pushes forward on the control yoke, commanding a reduction in the aircraft's angle of attack and thus preventing the aircraft from entering a full stall. In the majority of circumstances, the stick pusher will not activate until shortly after the stick shaker has given its warning of near-stall conditions being detected, and will not activate if the flight crew have performed appropriate actions to reduce the likelihood of stalling by lowering the angle of attack. Under most regulatory regimes, an aircraft's stall protection systems must be tested and armed prior to takeoff, as well as remain armed throughout the flight; for this reason, startup checklists normally include performing such tests as a matter of routine.

== Audio ==
The vibration of the stick shaker is loud enough that it can be commonly heard on cockpit voice recorder (CVR) recordings of aircraft that have encountered stall conditions. This level of vigorous movement is intentional, the stick shaker having been designed to be impossible to ignore. To unfamiliar flight crews, the stall warning system can be viewed as aggressive and impatient, hence why it has become commonplace for the system to be introduced to trainee pilots via a flight simulator rather than a live aircraft. To fly without them would increase the likelihood of the pilot encountering, and improperly responding to, a stall event.

== Flight crew factor ==
During the 2000s, there was a series of accidents that were attributed, at least in part, to their flight crews having made improper responses to the activation of the stall warning systems. During the early 2010s, in response to this wave of accidents, the FAA issued guidance urging operators to ensure that flight crews are properly trained on the correct use of these aids.
