= Stall (fluid dynamics) =

Abrupt reduction in lift due to flow separation

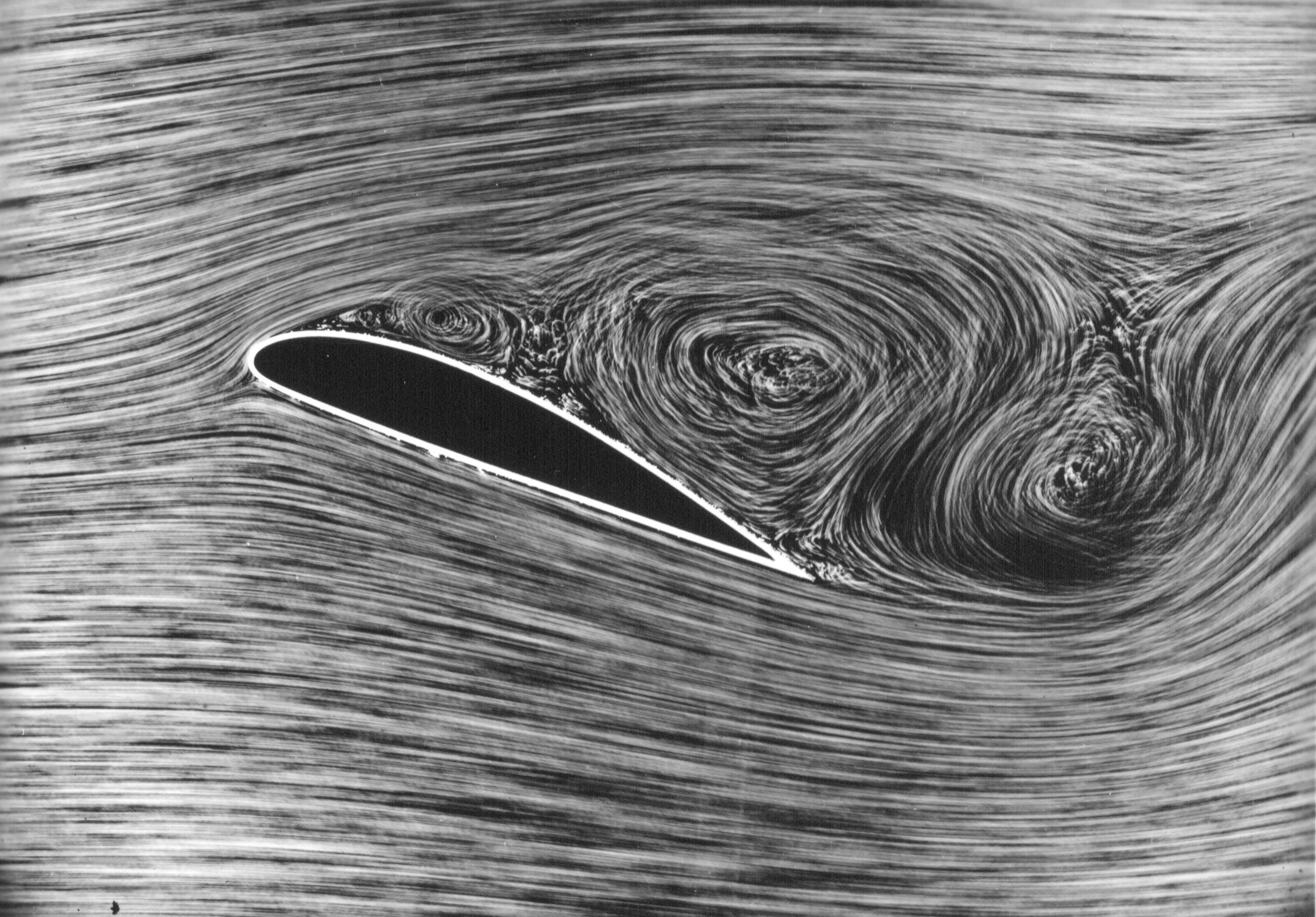
Airflow separating from an airfoil at a high angle of attack, as occurs at a stall.

In fluid dynamics, a stall is a reduction in the lift coefficient generated by a foil as angle of attack exceeds its critical value. The critical angle of attack is typically about 15°, but it may vary significantly depending on the fluid, foil – including its shape, size, and finish – and Reynolds number.

Stalls in fixed-wing aircraft are often experienced as a sudden reduction in lift as the airflow separates from the upper surface, which may be due to an increase in the wing's angle of attack past the critical angle or a decrease in the critical angle of attack. The former may be due to slowing down (below stall speed), the latter by accretion of ice on the wings. A stall does not mean that the engine(s) have stopped working, or that the aircraft has stopped moving—the effect is the same even in an unpowered glider aircraft.

Because stalls are most commonly discussed in connection with aviation, this article discusses stalls as they relate mainly to aircraft, in particular fixed-wing aircraft. The principles of stall discussed here translate to foils in other fluids as well.

== Formal definition ==
Stall formation

A stall is a condition in aerodynamics and aviation such that if the angle of attack on an aircraft increases beyond a certain point, then lift begins to decrease. The angle at which this occurs is called the critical angle of attack. If the angle of attack increases beyond the critical value, the lift decreases and the aircraft descends, further increasing the angle of attack and causing further loss of lift. The critical angle of attack is dependent upon the airfoil section or profile of the wing, its planform, its aspect ratio, and other factors, but is typically in the range of 8 to 20 degrees relative to the incoming wind (relative wind) for most subsonic airfoils. The critical angle of attack is the angle of attack on the lift coefficient versus angle-of-attack (Cl~alpha) curve at which the maximum lift coefficient occurs.

Stalling is caused by flow separation which, in turn, is caused by the air flowing against a rising pressure. Whitford describes three types of stall: trailing-edge, leading-edge and thin-aerofoil, each with distinctive Cl~alpha features. For the trailing-edge stall, separation begins at small angles of attack near the trailing edge of the wing while the rest of the flow over the wing remains attached. As angle of attack increases, the separated regions on the top of the wing increase in size as the flow separation moves forward, and this hinders the ability of the wing to create lift. This is shown by the reduction in lift-slope on a Cl~alpha curve as the lift nears its maximum value. The separated flow usually causes buffeting. Beyond the critical angle of attack, separated flow is so dominant that additional increases in angle of attack cause the lift to fall from its peak value.

Piston-engined and early jet transports had very good stall behaviour with pre-stall buffet warning and, if ignored, a straight nose-drop for a natural recovery. Wing developments that came with the introduction of turbo-prop engines introduced unacceptable stall behaviour. Leading-edge developments on high-lift wings, and the introduction of rear-mounted engines and high-set tailplanes on the next generation of jet transports, also introduced unacceptable stall behaviour. The probability of achieving the stall speed inadvertently, a potentially hazardous event, had been calculated, in 1965, at about once in every 100,000 flights, often enough to justify the cost of development of warning devices, such as stick shakers, and devices to automatically provide an adequate nose-down pitch, such as stick pushers.

When the mean angle of attack of the wings is beyond the stall, a spin, which is an autorotation of a stalled wing, may develop. A spin follows departures in roll, yaw and pitch from balanced flight. For example, a roll is naturally damped with an unstalled wing, but with wings stalled, the damping moment is replaced with a propelling moment.

== Variation of lift with angle of attack ==
An example of the relationship between angle of attack and lift on a cambered airfoil. The exact relationship is usually measured in a wind tunnel and depends on the airfoil section. The relationship for an aircraft wing depends on the planform and its aspect ratio.

The graph shows that the greatest amount of lift is produced as the critical angle of attack is reached (which in early-20th century aviation was called the "burble point"). This angle is 17.5 degrees in this case, but it varies from airfoil to airfoil. In particular, for aerodynamically thick airfoils (thickness to chord ratios of around 10%), the critical angle is higher than with a thin airfoil of the same camber. Symmetric airfoils have lower critical angles (but also work efficiently in inverted flight). The graph shows that, as the angle of attack exceeds the critical angle, the lift produced by the airfoil decreases.

The information in a graph of this kind is gathered using a model of the airfoil in a wind tunnel. Because aircraft models are normally used, rather than full-size machines, special care is needed to make sure that data is taken in the same Reynolds number regime (or scale speed) as in free flight. The separation of flow from the upper wing surface at high angles of attack is quite different at low Reynolds number from that at the high Reynolds numbers of real aircraft. In particular at high Reynolds numbers the flow tends to stay attached to the airfoil for longer because the inertial forces are dominant with respect to the viscous forces which are responsible for the flow separation ultimately leading to the aerodynamic stall. For this reason wind tunnel results carried out at lower speeds and on smaller scale models of the real life counterparts often tend to overestimate the aerodynamic stall angle of attack. High-pressure wind tunnels are one solution to this problem.

In general, steady operation of an aircraft at an angle of attack above the critical angle is not possible because, after exceeding the critical angle, the loss of lift from the wing causes the nose of the aircraft to fall, reducing the angle of attack again. This nose drop, independent of control inputs, indicates the pilot has actually stalled the aircraft.

This graph shows the stall angle, yet in practice most pilot operating handbooks (POH) or generic flight manuals describe stalling in terms of airspeed. This is because all aircraft are equipped with an airspeed indicator, but fewer aircraft have an angle of attack indicator. An aircraft's stalling speed is published by the manufacturer (and is required for certification by flight testing) for a range of weights and flap positions, but the stalling angle of attack is not published.

As speed reduces, angle of attack has to increase to keep lift constant until the critical angle is reached. The airspeed at which this angle is reached is the (1g, unaccelerated) stalling speed of the aircraft in that particular configuration. Deploying flaps/slats decreases the stall speed to allow the aircraft to take off and land at a lower speed.

== Aerodynamic description ==
=== Fixed-wing aircraft ===
A fixed-wing aircraft can be made to stall in any pitch attitude or bank angle or at any airspeed but deliberate stalling is commonly practiced by reducing the speed to the unaccelerated stall speed, at a safe altitude. Unaccelerated (1g) stall speed varies on different fixed-wing aircraft and is represented by colour codes on the airspeed indicator. As the plane flies at this speed, the angle of attack must be increased to prevent any loss of altitude or gain in airspeed (which corresponds to the stall angle described above). The pilot will notice the flight controls have become less responsive and may also notice some buffeting, a result of the turbulent air separated from the wing hitting the tail of the aircraft.

In most light aircraft, as the stall is reached, the aircraft will start to descend (because the wing is no longer producing enough lift to support the aircraft's weight) and the nose will pitch down. Recovery from the stall involves lowering the aircraft nose, to decrease the angle of attack and increase the air speed, until smooth air-flow over the wing is restored. Normal flight can be resumed once recovery is complete. The maneuver is normally quite safe, and, if correctly handled, leads to only a small loss in altitude (20–30 m/66–98 ft). It is taught and practised in order for pilots to recognize, avoid, and recover from stalling the aircraft. A pilot is required to demonstrate competency in controlling an aircraft during and after a stall for certification in the United States, and it is a routine maneuver for pilots when getting to know the handling of an unfamiliar aircraft type. The only dangerous aspect of a stall is a lack of altitude for recovery.

Incipient spin and recovery

A special form of asymmetric stall in which the aircraft also rotates about its yaw axis is called a spin. A spin can occur if an aircraft is stalled and there is an asymmetric yawing moment applied to it. This yawing moment can be aerodynamic (sideslip angle, rudder, adverse yaw from the ailerons), thrust related (p-factor, one engine inoperative on a multi-engine non-centreline thrust aircraft), or from less likely sources such as severe turbulence. The net effect is that one wing is stalled before the other and the aircraft descends rapidly while rotating, and some aircraft cannot recover from this condition without correct pilot control inputs (which must stop yaw) and loading. A new solution to the problem of difficult (or impossible) stall-spin recovery is provided by the ballistic parachute recovery system.

The most common stall-spin scenarios occur on takeoff (departure stall) and during landing (base to final turn) because of insufficient airspeed during these maneuvers. Stalls also occur during a go-around manoeuvre if the pilot does not properly respond to the out-of-trim situation resulting from the transition from low power setting to high power setting at low speed. Stall speed is increased when the wing surfaces are contaminated with ice or frost creating a rougher surface, and heavier airframe due to ice accumulation.

Stalls occur not only at slow airspeed, but at any speed when the wings exceed their critical angle of attack. Attempting to increase the angle of attack at 1g by moving the control column back normally causes the aircraft to climb. However, aircraft often experience higher g-forces, such as when turning steeply or pulling out of a dive. In these cases, the wings are already operating at a higher angle of attack to create the necessary force (derived from lift) to accelerate in the desired direction. Increasing the g-loading still further, by pulling back on the controls, can cause the stalling angle to be exceeded, even though the aircraft is flying at a high speed. These "high-speed stalls" produce the same buffeting characteristics as 1g stalls and can also initiate a spin if there is also any yawing.

=== Characteristics ===
Different aircraft types have different stalling characteristics but they only have to be good enough to satisfy their particular airworthiness authority. For example, the Short Belfast heavy freighter had a marginal nose drop which was acceptable to the Royal Air Force. When the aircraft were sold to a civil operator they had to be fitted with a stick pusher to meet the civil requirements. Some aircraft may naturally have very good behaviour well beyond what is required. For example, first generation jet transports have been described as having an immaculate nose drop at the stall. Loss of lift on one wing is acceptable as long as the roll, including during stall recovery, doesn't exceed about 20 degrees, or in turning flight the roll shall not exceed 90 degrees bank. If pre-stall warning followed by nose drop and limited wing drop are naturally not present or are deemed to be unacceptably marginal by an Airworthiness authority the stalling behaviour has to be made good enough with airframe modifications or devices such as a stick shaker and pusher. These are described in "Warning and safety devices".

== Stall speeds ==
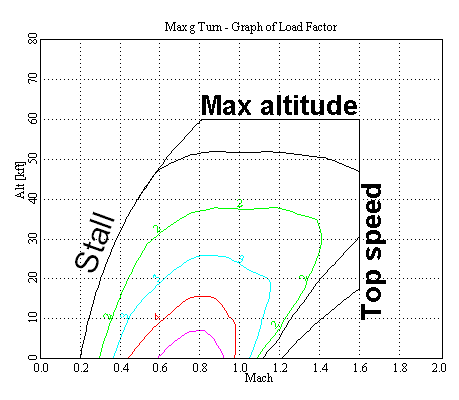
Flight envelope of a fast aeroplane. Left edge is the stall speed curve.

The airspeed indicator is often used to indirectly predict stall conditions.

Stalls depend only on angle of attack, not airspeed. However, the slower an aircraft flies, the greater the angle of attack it needs to produce lift equal to the aircraft's weight. As the speed decreases further, at some point this angle will be equal to the critical (stall) angle of attack. This speed is called the "stall speed". An aircraft flying at its stall speed cannot climb, and an aircraft flying below its stall speed cannot stop descending. Any attempt to do so by increasing angle of attack, without first increasing airspeed, will result in a stall.

The actual stall speed will vary depending on the airplane's weight, altitude, configuration, and vertical and lateral acceleration. Propeller slipstream reduces the stall speed by energizing the flow over the wings.

Speed definitions vary and include:

- V_{S}: Stall speed: the speed at which the airplane exhibits those qualities accepted as defining the stall.
- V_{S0}: The stall speed or minimum steady flight speed in landing configuration. The zero-thrust stall speed at the most extended landing flap setting.
- V_{S1}: The stall speed or minimum steady flight speed obtained in a specified configuration. The zero thrust stall speed at a specified flap setting.

An airspeed indicator, for the purpose of flight-testing, may have the following markings: the lowest-speed of the white arc indicates V_{S0} at maximum weight with the flaps down, while the lowest-speed of the green arc indicates V_{S1} at maximum weight. While an aircraft's V_{S} speed is computed by design, its V_{S0} and V_{S1} speeds must be demonstrated empirically by flight testing.

== In accelerated and turning flight ==
Illustration of a turning flight stall, occurring during a co-ordinated turn with progressively increasing angle of bank.

The normal stall speed, specified by the V_{S} values above, always refers to straight and level flight, where the load factor is equal to 1g. However, if the aircraft is turning or pulling up from a dive, additional lift is required to provide the vertical or lateral acceleration, and so the stall speed is higher. An accelerated stall is a stall that occurs under such conditions.

In a banked turn, the lift required is equal to the weight of the aircraft plus extra lift to provide the centripetal force necessary to perform the turn:

$$L = nW$$

where:

$L$ = lift
$n$ = load factor (greater than 1 in a turn)
$W$ = weight of the aircraft

To achieve the extra lift, the lift coefficient, and so the angle of attack, will have to be higher than it would be in straight and level flight at the same speed. Therefore, given that the stall always occurs at the same critical angle of attack, by increasing the load factor (e.g. by tightening the turn) the critical angle will be reached at a higher airspeed:

$$V_\text{st} = V_\text{s} \sqrt n$$

where:

$V_\text{st}$ = stall speed
$V_\text{s}$ = stall speed of the aircraft in straight, level flight
$n$ = load factor

The table that follows gives some examples of the relation between the angle of bank and the square root of the load factor. It derives from the trigonometric relation (secant) between $L$ and $W$.

Bank angle	$\sqrt n$
30°	1.07
45°	1.19
60°	1.41

For example, in a turn with bank angle of 45°, V_{st} is 19% higher than V_{s}.

According to Federal Aviation Administration (FAA) terminology, the above example illustrates a so-called turning flight stall, while the term accelerated is used to indicate an accelerated turning stall only, that is, a turning flight stall where the airspeed decreases at a given rate.

The tendency of powerful propeller aircraft to roll in reaction to engine torque creates a risk of accelerated stalls. When an aircraft such as a Mitsubishi MU-2 is flying close to its stall speed, the sudden application of full power may cause it to roll, creating the same aerodynamic conditions that induce an accelerated stall in turning flight even if the pilot did not deliberately initiate a turn. Pilots of such aircraft are trained to avoid sudden and drastic increases in power at low altitude and low airspeed as it may be difficult to recover from an accelerated stall under these conditions.

During a canyon escape turn, the load factor and stall speed both increase. An accelerated stall may happen if a pilot does not keep proper track of their airspeed. The crash of a Cessna 152 near Harrison Lake, British Columbia occurred due to a stall while trying to escape a box canyon.

A notable example of an air accident involving a low-altitude turning flight stall is the 1994 Fairchild Air Force Base B-52H Stratofortress crash.

== Types ==
=== Dynamic stall ===
Dynamic stall is a non-linear unsteady aerodynamic effect that occurs when airfoils rapidly change the angle of attack. The rapid change can cause a strong vortex to be shed from the leading edge of the aerofoil, and travel backwards above the wing. The vortex, containing high-velocity airflows, briefly increases the lift produced by the wing. As soon as it passes behind the trailing edge, however, the lift reduces dramatically, and the wing is in normal stall.

Dynamic stall is an effect most associated with helicopters and flapping wings, though also occurs in wind turbines, and due to gusting airflow. During forward flight, some regions of a helicopter blade may incur flow that reverses (compared to the direction of blade movement), and thus includes rapidly changing angles of attack. Oscillating (flapping) wings, such as those of insects like the bumblebee, may rely almost entirely on dynamic stall for lift production, provided the oscillations are fast compared to the speed of flight, and the angle of the wing changes rapidly compared to airflow direction.

Stall delay can occur on airfoils subject to a high angle of attack and a three-dimensional flow. When the angle of attack on an airfoil is increasing rapidly, the flow will remain substantially attached to the airfoil to a significantly higher angle of attack than can be achieved in steady-state conditions. As a result, the stall is delayed momentarily and a lift coefficient significantly higher than the steady-state maximum is achieved. The effect was first noticed on propellers.

=== Deep stall ===
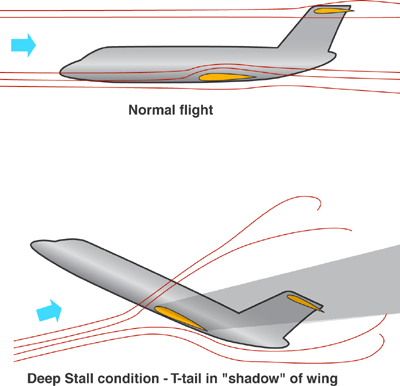
Diagrammatic representation of a deep stall. Normal flight (above), Deep stall condition - T-tail in "shadow" of wing (below)

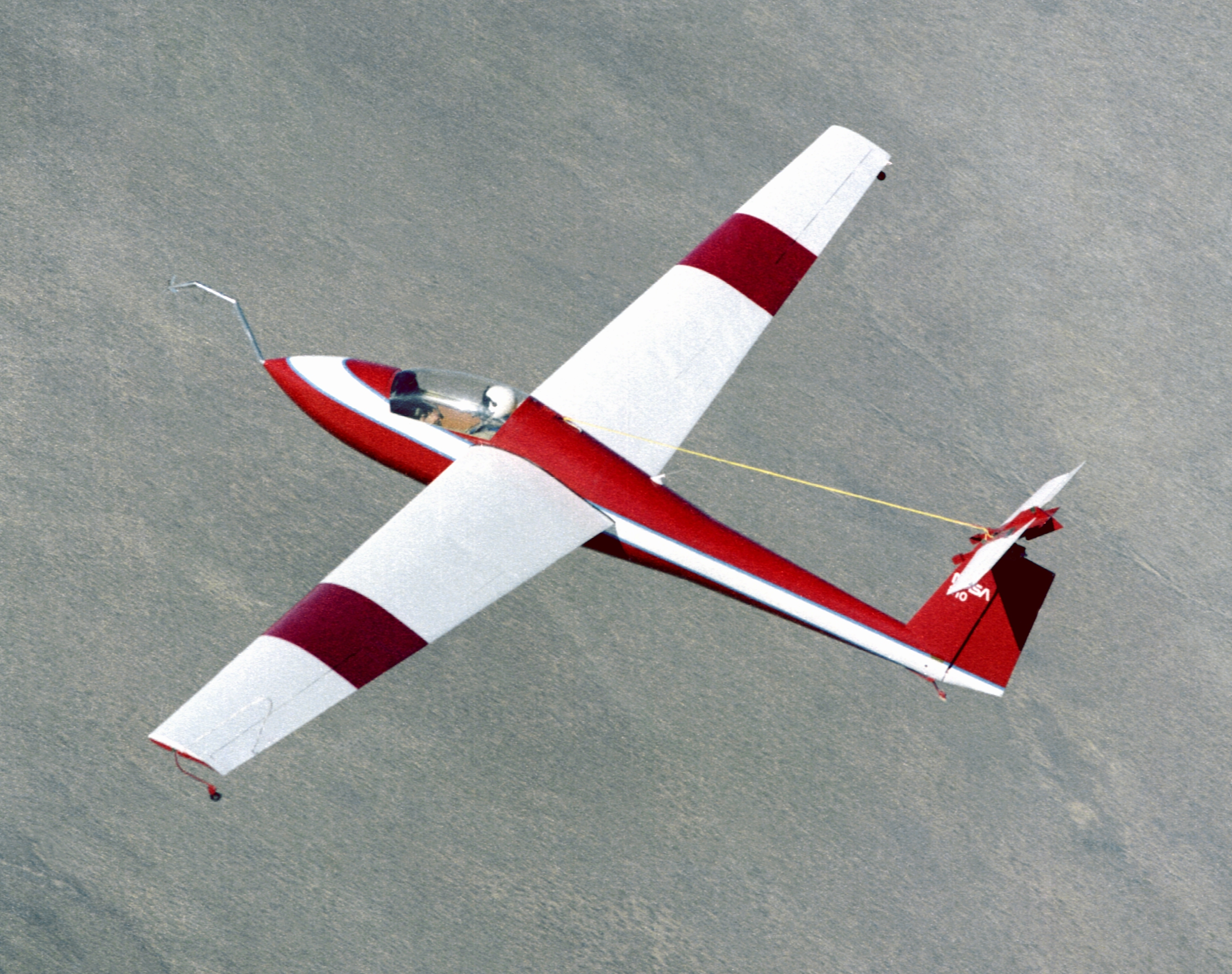
A Schweizer SGS 1-36 being used for deep-stall research by NASA over the Mojave Desert in 1983.

A deep stall (or super-stall) is a dangerous type of stall that affects certain aircraft designs, notably jet aircraft with a T-tail configuration and rear-mounted engines. In these designs, the turbulent wake of a stalled main wing, nacelle-pylon wakes and the wake from the fuselage "blanket" the horizontal stabilizer, rendering the elevators ineffective and preventing the aircraft from recovering from the stall. Aircraft with rear-mounted nacelles may also exhibit a loss of thrust. T-tail propeller aircraft are generally resistant to deep stalls, because the prop wash increases airflow over the wing root, but may be fitted with a precautionary vertical tail booster during flight testing, as happened with the A400M.

Brian Trubshaw gives a broad definition of deep stall as penetrating to such angles of attack $\alpha$ that pitch control effectiveness is reduced by the wing and nacelle wakes. He also gives a definition that relates deep stall to a locked-in condition where recovery is impossible. This is a single value of $\alpha$, for a given aircraft configuration, where there is no pitching moment, i.e. a trim point.

Typical values both for the range of deep stall, as defined above, and the locked-in trim point are given for the Douglas DC-9 Series 10 by Schaufele. These values are from wind-tunnel tests for an early design. The final design had no locked-in trim point, so recovery from the deep stall region was possible, as required to meet certification rules. Normal stall beginning at the "g break" (sudden decrease of the vertical load factor) was at $\alpha = 18^\circ$, deep stall started at about 30°, and the locked-in unrecoverable trim point was at 47°.

The very high $\alpha$ for a deep stall locked-in condition occurs well beyond the normal stall but can be attained very rapidly, as the aircraft is unstable beyond the normal stall and requires immediate action to arrest it. The loss of lift causes high sink rates, which, together with the low forward speed at the normal stall, give a high $\alpha$ with little or no rotation of the aircraft. BAC 1-11 G-ASHG, during stall flight tests before the type was modified to prevent a locked-in deep-stall condition, descended at over 10,000 feet per minute (50 m/s) and struck the ground in a flat attitude moving only 70 feet (20 m) forward after initial impact. Sketches showing how the wing wake blankets the tail may be misleading if they imply that deep stall requires a high body angle. Taylor and Ray show how the aircraft attitude in the deep stall is relatively flat, even less than during the normal stall, with very high negative flight-path angles.

Effects similar to deep stall had been known to occur on some aircraft designs before the term was coined. A prototype Gloster Javelin (serial WD808) was lost in a crash on 11 June 1953 to a "locked-in" stall. However, Waterton states that the trimming tailplane was found to be the wrong way for recovery. Low-speed handling tests were being done to assess a new wing. Handley Page Victor XL159 was lost to a "stable stall" on 23 March 1962. It had been clearing the fixed droop leading edge with the test being stall approach, landing configuration, C of G aft. The brake parachute had not been streamed, as it might have hindered rear crew escape.

The name "deep stall" first came into widespread use after the crash of the prototype BAC 1-11 G-ASHG on 22 October 1963, which killed its crew. This led to changes to the aircraft, including the installation of a stick shaker (see below) to clearly warn the pilot of an impending stall. Stick shakers are now a standard part of commercial airliners. Nevertheless, the problem continues to cause accidents; on 3 June 1966, a Hawker Siddeley Trident (G-ARPY), was lost to deep stall; deep stall is suspected to be cause of another Trident (the British European Airways Flight 548 G-ARPI) crash – known as the "Staines Disaster" – on 18 June 1972, when the crew failed to notice the conditions and had disabled the stall-recovery system. On 3 April 1980, a prototype of the Canadair Challenger business jet crashed after initially entering a deep stall from 17,000 ft and having both engines flame-out. It recovered from the deep stall after deploying the anti-spin parachute but crashed after being unable to jettison the chute or relight the engines. One of the test pilots was unable to escape from the aircraft in time and was killed. On 26 July 1993, a Canadair CRJ-100 was lost in flight testing due to a deep stall. It has been reported that a Boeing 727 entered a deep stall in a flight test, but the pilot was able to rock the airplane to increasingly higher bank angles until the nose finally fell through and normal control response was recovered. The crash of West Caribbean Airways Flight 708 in 2005 was also attributed to a deep stall. AirAsia Flight 8501 is yet another notable example of an unrecoverable stall. The 2024 Saurya Airlines Bombardier CRJ200 crash has been attributed to a deep stall caused by slow speed and excessive rotation rate during takeoff.

Canard-configured aircraft are also at risk of getting into a deep stall. Two Velocity aircraft crashed due to locked-in deep stalls. Testing revealed that the addition of leading-edge cuffs to the outboard wing prevented the aircraft from getting into a deep stall. The Piper Advanced Technologies PAT-1, N15PT, another canard-configured aircraft, also crashed in an accident attributed to a deep stall. Wind-tunnel testing of the design at the NASA Langley Research Center showed that it was vulnerable to a deep stall.

=== Tip stall ===
Wing sweep and taper cause stalling at the tip of a wing before the root. The position of a swept wing along the fuselage has to be such that the lift from the wing root, well forward of the aircraft center of gravity (c.g.), must be balanced by the wing tip, well aft of the c.g. If the tip stalls first the balance of the aircraft is upset causing dangerous nose pitch up. Swept wings have to incorporate features which prevent pitch-up caused by premature tip stall.

A swept wing has a higher lift coefficient on its outer panels than on the inner wing, causing them to reach their maximum lift capability first and to stall first. This is caused by the downwash pattern associated with swept/tapered wings. To delay tip stall the outboard wing is given washout to reduce its angle of attack. The root can also be modified with a suitable leading-edge and airfoil section to make sure it stalls before the tip. However, when taken beyond stalling incidence the tips may still become fully stalled before the inner wing despite initial separation occurring inboard. This causes pitch-up after the stall and entry to a super-stall on those aircraft with super-stall characteristics. Span-wise flow of the boundary layer is also present on swept wings and causes tip stall. The amount of boundary layer air flowing outboard can be reduced by generating vortices with a leading-edge device such as a fence, notch, saw tooth or a set of vortex generators behind the leading edge.

== Warning and safety devices ==
Second World War-era US Navy pilot training film regarding stall, correction and avoidance.

Fixed-wing aircraft can be equipped with devices to prevent or postpone a stall or to make it less (or in some cases more) severe, or to make recovery easier.

- An aerodynamic twist can be introduced to the wing with the leading edge near the wing tip twisted downward. This is called washout and causes the wing root to stall before the wing tip. This makes the stall gentle and progressive. Since the stall is delayed at the wing tips, where the ailerons are, roll control is maintained when the stall begins.
- A stall strip is a small sharp-edged device that, when attached to the leading edge of a wing, encourages the stall to start there in preference to any other location on the wing. If attached close to the wing root, it makes the stall gentle and progressive; if attached near the wing tip, it encourages the aircraft to drop a wing when stalling.
- A stall fence is a flat plate in the direction of the chord to stop separated flow progressing out along the wing
- Vortex generators, tiny strips of metal or plastic placed on top of the wing near the leading edge that protrude past the boundary layer into the free stream. As the name implies, they energize the boundary layer by mixing free stream airflow with boundary layer flow, thereby creating vortices, this increases the momentum in the boundary layer. By increasing the momentum of the boundary layer, airflow separation and the resulting stall may be delayed.
- An anti-stall strake is a leading edge extension that generates a vortex on the wing upper surface to postpone the stall.
- A stick pusher is a mechanical device that prevents the pilot from stalling an aircraft. It pushes the elevator control forward as the stall is approached, causing a reduction in the angle of attack. In generic terms, a stick pusher is known as a stall identification device or stall identification system.
- A stick shaker is a mechanical device that shakes the pilot's controls to warn of the onset of stall.
- A stall warning is an electronic or mechanical device that sounds an audible warning as the stall speed is approached. The majority of aircraft contain some form of this device that warns the pilot of an impending stall. The simplest such device is a stall warning horn, which consists of either a pressure sensor or a movable metal tab that actuates a switch and produces an audible warning in response.
- An angle-of-attack indicator for light aircraft, the "AlphaSystemsAOA" and a nearly identical "lift reserve indicator", are both pressure-differential instruments that display margin above stall and/or angle of attack on an instantaneous, continuous readout. The General Technics CYA-100 displays true angle of attack via a magnetically coupled vane. An AOA indicator provides a visual display of the amount of available lift throughout its slow-speed envelope regardless of the many variables that act upon an aircraft. This indicator is immediately responsive to changes in speed, angle of attack, and wind conditions, and automatically compensates for aircraft weight, altitude, and temperature.
- An angle of attack limiter or an "alpha limiter" is a flight computer that automatically prevents pilot input from causing the plane to rise over the stall angle. Some alpha limiters can be disabled by the pilot.

Stall warning systems often involve inputs from a broad range of sensors and systems to include a dedicated angle of attack sensor.

Blockage, damage, or inoperation of stall and angle of attack (AOA) probes can lead to unreliability of the stall warning and cause the stick pusher, overspeed warning, autopilot, and yaw damper to malfunction.

If a forward canard is used for pitch control, rather than an aft tail, the canard is designed to meet the airflow at a slightly greater angle of attack than the wing. Therefore, when the aircraft pitch increases abnormally, the canard will usually stall first, causing the nose to drop and so preventing the wing from reaching its critical AOA. Thus, the risk of main-wing stalling is greatly reduced. However, if the main wing stalls, recovery becomes difficult, as the canard is more deeply stalled, and angle of attack increases rapidly.

If an aft tail is used, the wing is designed to stall before the tail. In this case, the wing can be flown at higher lift coefficient (closer to stall) to produce more overall lift.

Most military combat aircraft have an angle of attack indicator among the pilot's instruments, which lets the pilot know precisely how close to the stall point the aircraft is. Modern airliner instrumentation may also measure angle of attack, although this information may not be directly displayed on the pilot's display, instead driving a stall warning indicator or giving performance information to the flight computer (for fly-by-wire systems).

== Flight beyond the stall ==
As a wing stalls, aileron effectiveness is reduced, rendering the plane difficult to control and increasing the risk of a spin. Post stall, steady flight beyond the stalling angle (where the coefficient of lift is largest) requires engine thrust to replace lift, as well as alternative controls to replace the loss of effectiveness of the ailerons. Short-term stalls at 90–120° (e.g. Pugachev's cobra) are sometimes performed at airshows. The highest angle of attack in sustained flight so far demonstrated was 70° in the X-31 at the Dryden Flight Research Center. Sustained post-stall flight is a type of supermaneuverability.

== Spoilers ==
Except for flight training, airplane testing, and aerobatics, a stall is usually an undesirable event. Spoilers (sometimes called lift dumpers), however, are devices that are intentionally deployed to create a carefully controlled flow separation over part of an aircraft's wing to reduce the lift it generates, increase the drag, and allow the aircraft to descend more rapidly without gaining speed. Spoilers are also deployed asymmetrically (one wing only) to enhance roll control. Spoilers can also be used on aborted take-offs and after main wheel contact on landing to increase the aircraft's weight on its wheels for better braking action.

Unlike powered airplanes, which can control descent by increasing or decreasing thrust, gliders have to increase drag to increase the rate of descent. In high-performance gliders, spoiler deployment is extensively used to control the approach to landing.

Spoilers can also be thought of as "lift reducers" because they reduce the lift of the wing in which the spoiler resides. For example, an uncommanded roll to the left could be reversed by raising the right wing spoiler (or only a few of the spoilers present in large airliner wings). This has the advantage of avoiding the need to increase lift in the wing that is dropping (which may bring that wing closer to stalling).

== History ==
German aviator Otto Lilienthal died while flying in 1896 as the result of a stall. Wilbur Wright encountered stalls for the first time in 1901, while flying his second glider. Awareness of Lilienthal's accident and Wilbur's experience motivated the Wright brothers to design their plane in "canard" configuration. This purportedly made recoveries from stalls easier and more gentle. The design allegedly saved the brothers' lives more than once. However, canard configurations, without careful design, can actually make a stall unrecoverable.

The aircraft engineer Juan de la Cierva worked on his "Autogiro" project to develop a rotary wing aircraft which, he hoped, would be unable to stall and which therefore would be safer than aeroplanes. In developing the resulting "autogyro" aircraft, his solution of numerous engineering problems related to the rotary wing led to the development of the helicopter.

== See also ==
Articles

- Aviation safety
- Coffin corner (aerodynamics)
- Compressor stall
- Lift coefficient
- Spin (flight)
- Spoiler (aeronautics)
- Wing twist

Notable accidents

- 1963 BAC One-Eleven test crash
- 1966 Felthorpe Trident crash
- British European Airways Flight 548
- China Airlines Flight 140
- China Airlines Flight 676
- Yeti Airlines Flight 691
- Air France Flight 447
- Colgan Air Flight 3407
- Turkish Airlines Flight 1951
- Indonesia AirAsia Flight 8501
- West Caribbean Airways Flight 708
- 2017 Teterboro Learjet crash
- Northwest Orient Airlines Flight 6231
- Voepass Linhas Aéreas Flight 2283
- Pulkovo Aviation Enterprise Flight 612
