= Salisbury =

Cathedral city in Wiltshire, England

Coordinates: 51°04′11″N 1°47′42″W

- City
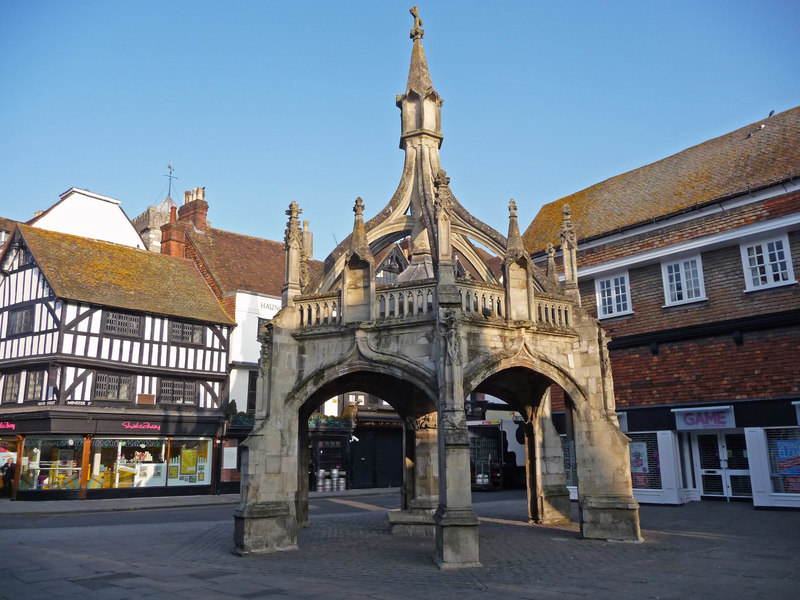
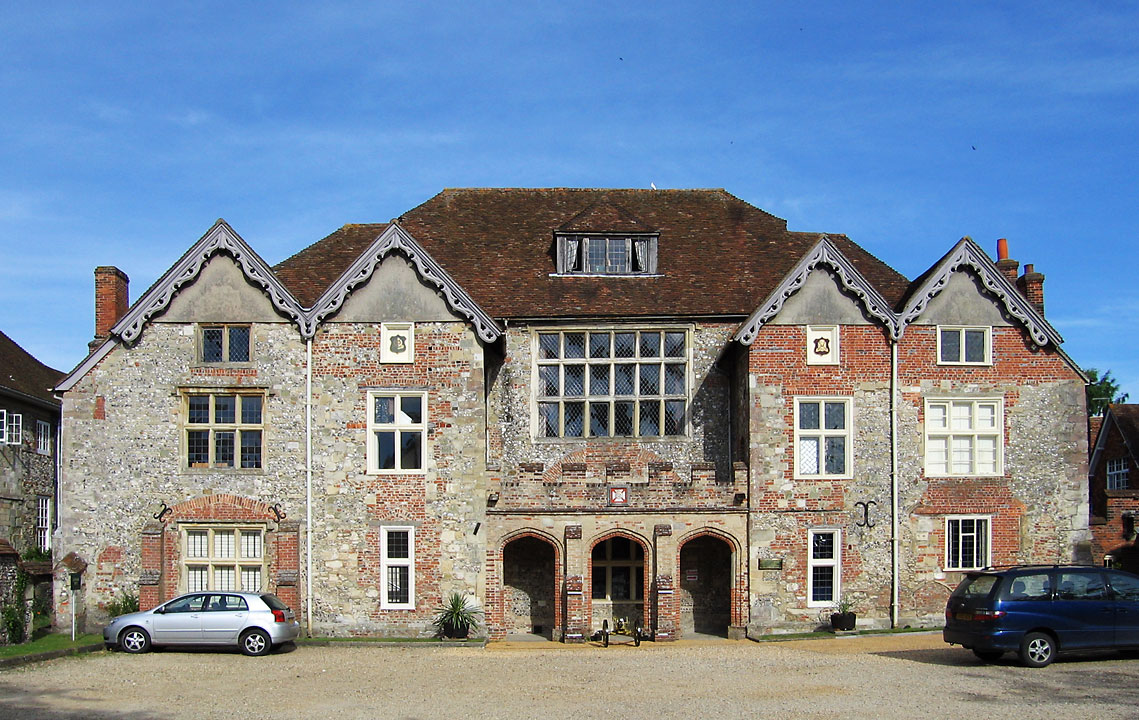
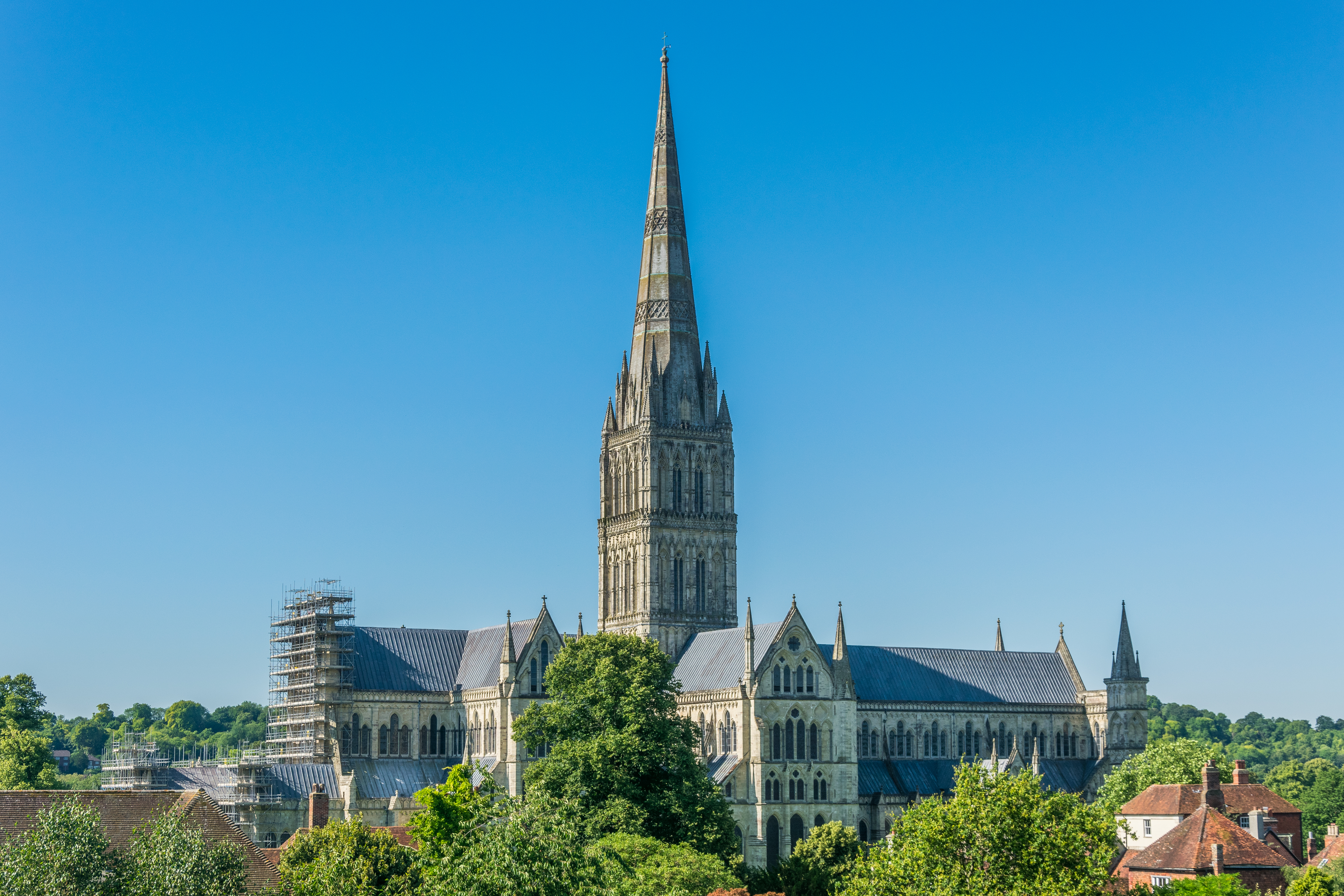
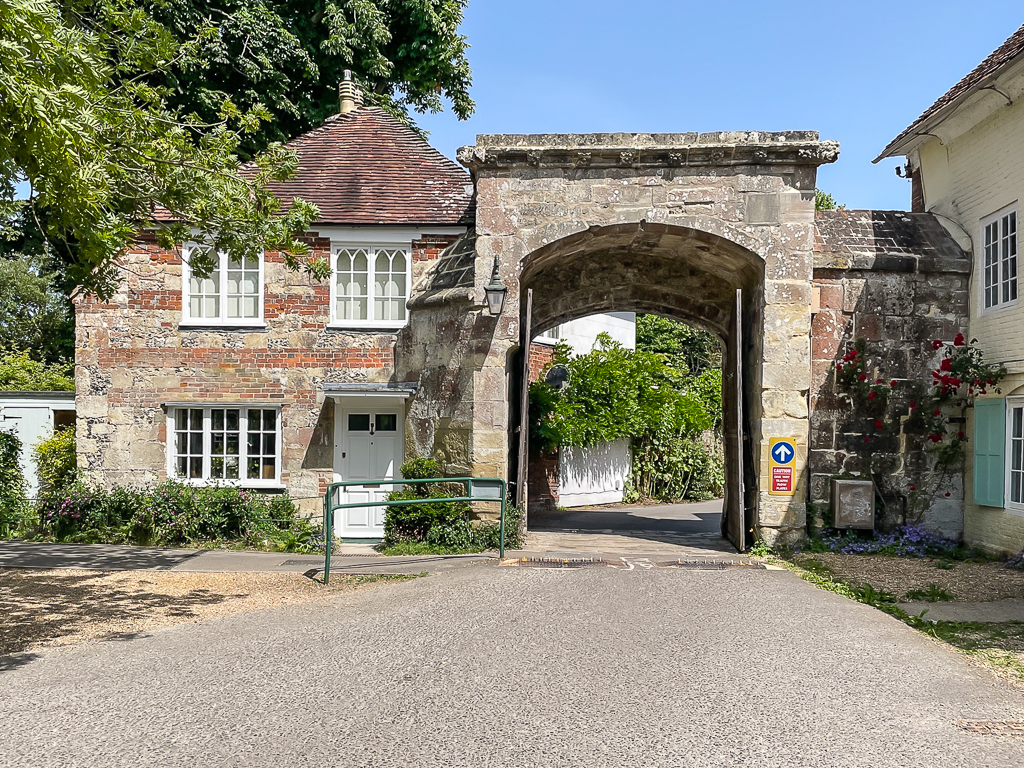
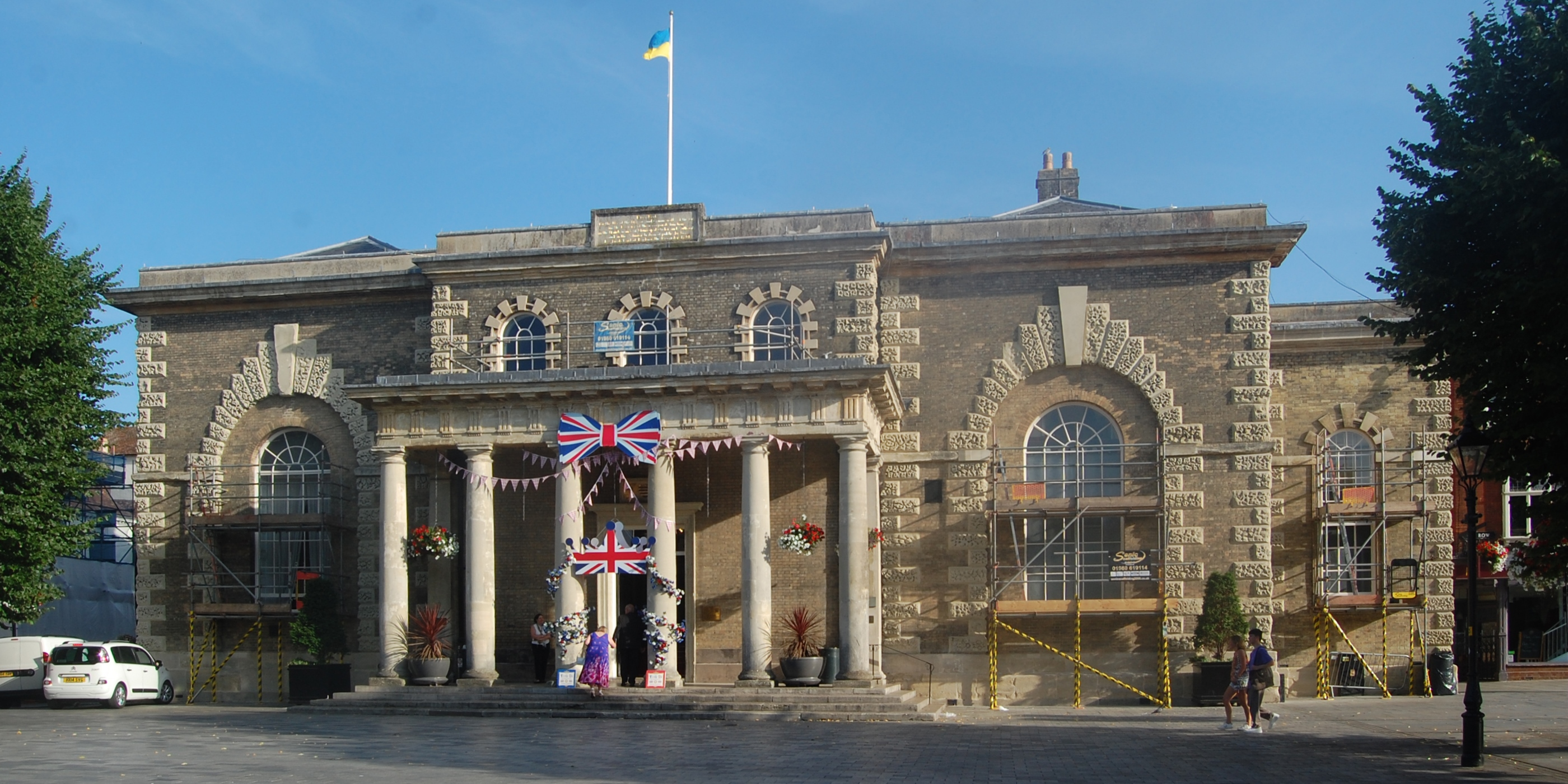
- Poultry Cross The Wardrobe Salisbury Cathedral Harnham Gate Guildhall

- Location within Wiltshire
- Interactive map of Salisbury
- Area: 7.14 sq mi (18.5 km^{2})
- Population: 41,820 (2021 Census)
  - Density: 5,857/sq mi (2,261/km^{2})
- OS grid reference: SU145305
  - London: 78 miles (126 km)
- Civil parish: Salisbury
- Unitary authority: Wiltshire
- Ceremonial county: Wiltshire
- Region: South West
- Country: England
- Sovereign state: United Kingdom
- Post town: SALISBURY
- Postcode district: SP1, SP2
- Dialling code: 01722
- Police: Wiltshire
- Fire: Dorset and Wiltshire
- Ambulance: South Western
- UK Parliament: Salisbury
- Website: salisburycitycouncil.gov.uk

Salisbury (/ˈsɔːlzbəri/ SAWLZ-bər-ee, locally /ˈsɔːzbəri/ SAWZ-bər-ee) is a cathedral city and civil parish in Wiltshire, England with a population of 41,820, at the confluence of the rivers Avon, Nadder and Bourne. The city is approximately 20 miles (30 kilometres) from Southampton and 30 miles (50 kilometres) from Bath.

Salisbury is in the southeast of Wiltshire, near the edge of Salisbury Plain. An ancient cathedral was north of the present city at Old Sarum. A new cathedral was built near the meeting of the rivers and a settlement grew up around it, which received a city charter in 1227 as New Sarum. This continued to be its official name until 2009, when Salisbury City Council was established. Salisbury railway station is an interchange between the West of England Line and the Wessex Main Line.

Stonehenge, a UNESCO World Heritage Site, is 8 miles (13 kilometres) northwest of Salisbury.

== Toponymy ==
Cair-Caratauc, one of 28 cities of the Ancient Britons listed in the History of the Britons (9th century), has been identified with Salisbury. Alternative names for the city, in the Welsh Chronicle of the Britons (12th century) were Caer-Caradog, Caer-Gradawc, and Caer-Wallawg.

By the Roman era, the name had become Sorbiodūnum; the first part was of unknown origin, although the Brittonic suffix -dūnon meant "fortress". The name first recorded during the Anglo-Saxon era was Searoburg (dative Searobyrig), around the end of the 9th century. This was a partial calque of the Roman name, with burg being the Old English word for "fort". Middle English Sarisberie was abbreviated as Sar, which in turn gave rise to the latinization "Sarum".

== History ==
=== Old Sarum ===
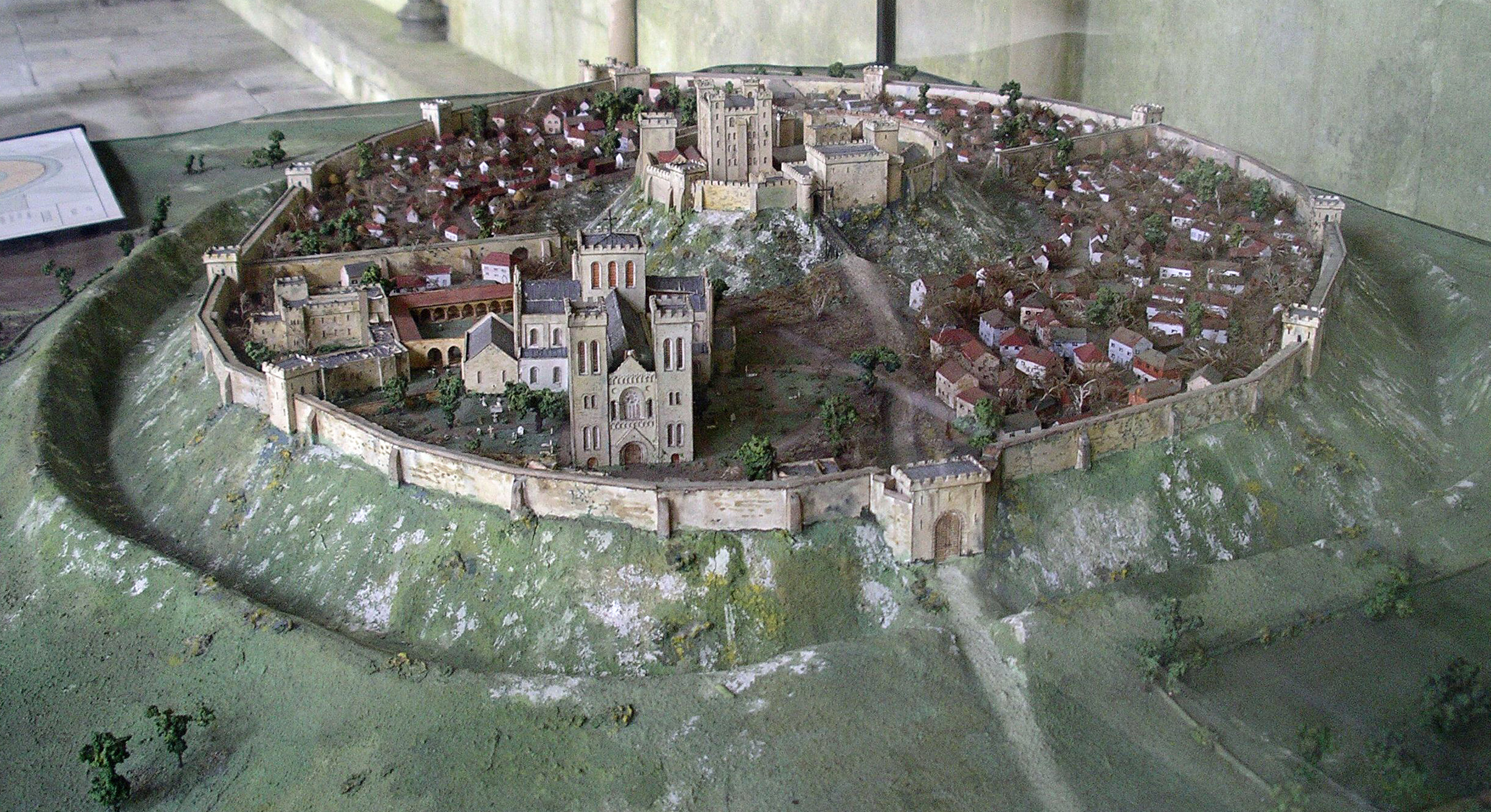
A reconstruction of Old Sarum in the 12th century

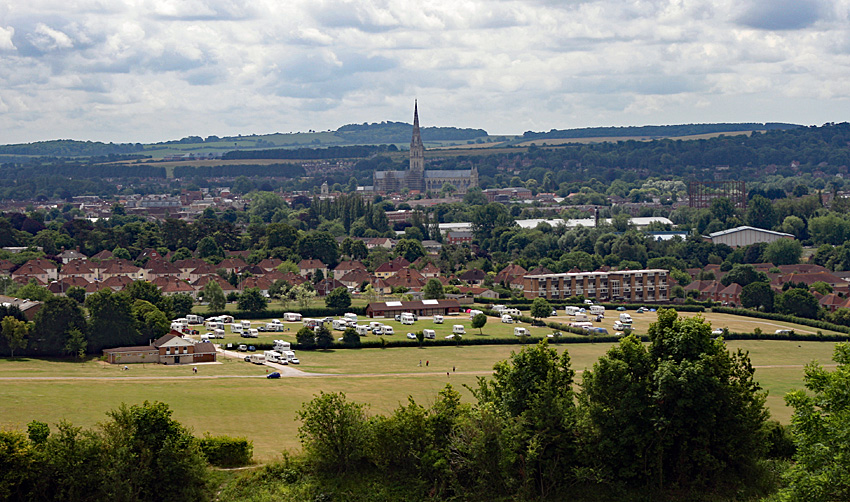
Salisbury viewed from Old Sarum

The hilltop at Old Sarum lies near the Neolithic sites of Stonehenge and Avebury and shows some signs of early settlement. It commanded a salient between the River Bourne and the Hampshire Avon, near a crossroads of several early trade routes. During the Iron Age, sometime between 600 and 300 BC, a hillfort (oppidum) was constructed around it. The Romans may have occupied the site or left it in the hands of an allied tribe. At the time of the Saxon invasions, Old Sarum fell to King Cynric of Wessex in 552. Preferring settlements in bottomland, such as nearby Wilton, the Saxons largely ignored Old Sarum until the Viking invasions led King Alfred (King of Wessex from 871 to 899) to restore its fortifications. Along with Wilton, however, it was abandoned by its residents to be sacked and burned by the Dano-Norwegian king Sweyn Forkbeard in 1003. It subsequently became the site of Wilton's mint. Following the Norman invasion of 1066, a motte-and-bailey castle was constructed by 1070. The castle was held directly by the Norman kings; its castellan was generally also the sheriff of Wiltshire.

In 1075 the Council of London established Herman as the first bishop of Salisbury, uniting his former sees of Sherborne and Ramsbury into a single diocese which covered the counties of Dorset, Wiltshire, and Berkshire. In 1055, Herman had planned to move his seat to Malmesbury, but its monks and Earl Godwin objected. Herman and his successor, Saint Osmund, began the construction of the first Salisbury cathedral, though neither lived to see its completion in 1092. Osmund served as Lord Chancellor of England (in office c. 1070–1078); he was responsible for the codification of the Sarum Rite, the compilation of the Domesday Book, which was probably presented to William at Old Sarum, and, after centuries of advocacy from Salisbury's bishops, was finally canonised by Pope Callixtus III in 1457. The cathedral was consecrated on 5 April 1092 but suffered extensive damage in a storm, traditionally said to have occurred only five days later. Bishop Roger was a close ally of Henry I (reigned 1100–1135): he served as viceroy during the king's absence in Normandy and directed, along with his extended family, the royal administration and exchequer. He refurbished and expanded Old Sarum's cathedral in the 1110s and began work on a royal palace during the 1130s, prior to his arrest by Henry's successor, Stephen. After this arrest, the castle at Old Sarum was allowed to fall into disrepair, but the sheriff and castellan continued to administer the area under the king's authority.

=== New Sarum ===
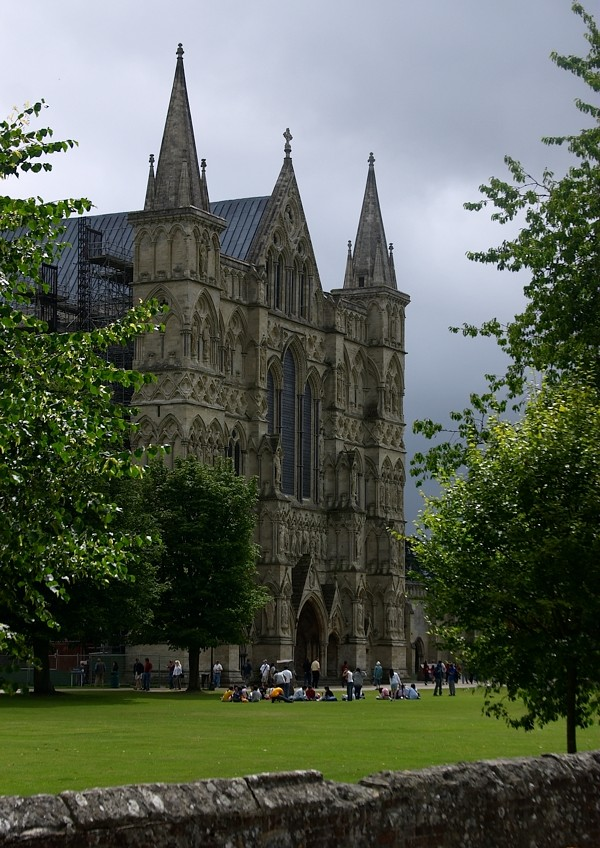
The Great West Front of Salisbury Cathedral

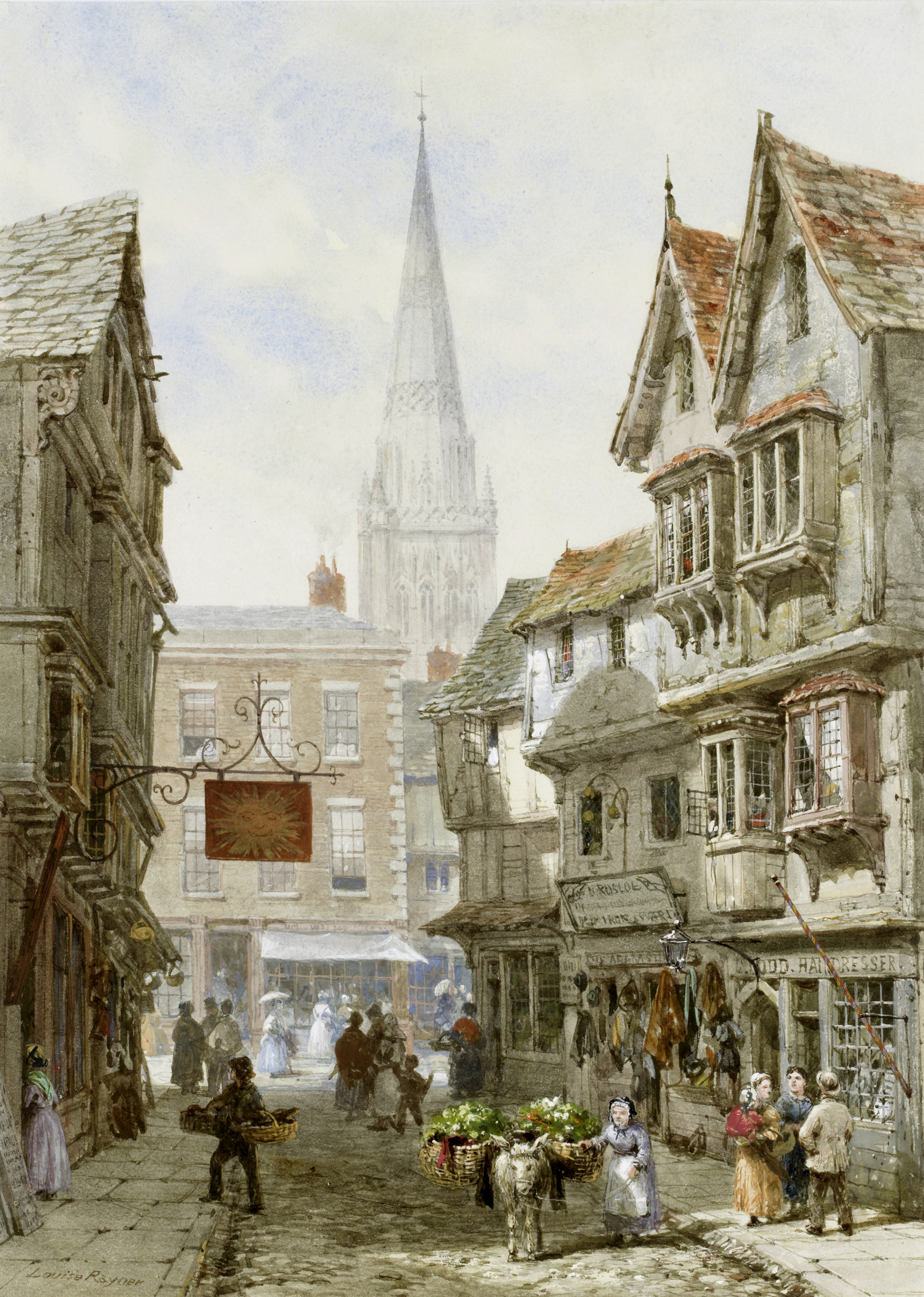
Minster Street, c. 1870

Bishop of Salisbury Hubert Walter was instrumental in the negotiations with Saladin during the Third Crusade, but he spent little time in his diocese prior to his elevation to archbishop of Canterbury. The brothers Herbert and Richard Poore succeeded him and began planning the relocation of the cathedral into the valley almost immediately. Their plans were approved by King Richard I but repeatedly delayed: Herbert was first forced into exile in Normandy in the 1190s by the hostility of his archbishop Walter and then again to Scotland in the 1210s owing to royal hostility following the papal interdiction against King John. The secular authorities were particularly incensed, according to tradition, owing to some of the clerics debauching the castellan's female relations. In the end, the clerics were refused permission to reenter the city walls following their rogations and processions. This caused Peter of Blois to describe the church as "a captive within the walls of the citadel like the ark of God in the profane house of Baal". He advocated:

Let us descend into the plain! There are rich fields and fertile valleys abounding in the fruits of the earth and watered by the living stream. There is a seat for the Virgin Patroness of our church to which the world cannot produce a parallel.

Herbert Poore's successor and brother, Richard Poore, eventually moved the cathedral to a new town on his estate at Veteres Sarisberias ("Old Salisburies") in 1220. The site was at "Myrifield" ("Merryfield"), a meadow near the confluence of the River Nadder and the Hampshire Avon. It was first known as "New Sarum" or New Saresbyri. The town was laid out on a grid.

Work on the new cathedral building, the present Salisbury Cathedral, began in 1221. The site was supposedly established by shooting an arrow from Old Sarum, although this is certainly a legend: the distance is over three kilometres (2 mi). The legend is sometimes amended to claim that the arrow struck a white deer, which continued to run and died on the spot where the cathedral now rests. The structure was built upon wooden faggots on a gravel bed with unusually shallow foundations of 18 in (45 cm) and the main body was completed in only 38 years. The 123 m or 404 ft tall spire, the tallest in the UK, was built later. With royal approval, many of the stones for the new cathedral were taken from the old one; others came from Chilmark. They were probably transported by ox-cart, owing to the obstruction to boats on the River Nadder caused by its many weirs and watermills. The cathedral is considered a masterpiece of Early English architecture. The spire's large clock was installed in 1386, and is one of the oldest surviving mechanical clocks in the world. The cathedral also contains the best-preserved of the four surviving copies of Magna Carta.

New Sarum was made a city by a charter from King Henry III in 1227 and, by the 14th century, was the largest settlement in Wiltshire. The city wall surrounds the Close and was built in the 14th century, again with stones removed from the former cathedral at Old Sarum. The wall now has five gates: the High Street Gate, St Ann's Gate, the Queen's Gate, and St Nicholas's Gate were original, while a fifth was constructed in the 19th century to allow access to Bishop Wordsworth's School, in the Cathedral Close. During his time in the city, the composer Handel stayed in a room above St Ann's gate. The original site of the city at Old Sarum, meanwhile, fell into disuse. It continued as a rotten borough: at the time of its abolition during the reforms of 1832, its Member of Parliament (MP) represented three households.

In May 1289, there was uncertainty about the future of Margaret, Maid of Norway, and her father sent ambassadors to Edward I. Edward met Robert the Bruce and others at Salisbury in October 1289, which resulted in the Treaty of Salisbury, under which Margaret would be sent to Scotland before 1 November 1290 and any agreement on her future marriage would be delayed until she was in Scotland.

The Parliament of England met at New Sarum in the years 1324, 1328, and 1384.

In 1450, a number of riots broke out in Salisbury at roughly the same time as Jack Cade led a famous rebellion through London. The riots occurred for related reasons, although the declining fortunes of Salisbury's cloth trade may also have been influential. The violence peaked with the murder of the bishop, William Ayscough, who had been involved with the government. In 1483, a large-scale rebellion against Richard III broke out, led by his own 'kingmaker', Henry Stafford, 2nd Duke of Buckingham. After the revolt collapsed, Buckingham was executed at Salisbury, near the Bull's Head Inn. An act of Parliament, the River Avon Navigation (Christchurch to New Sarum) Act 1664 (16 & 17 Cha. 2. c. 12) was passed on 2 March 1665 for making the River Avon navigable from Christchurch to the city of New Sarum, and the work completed, only for the project to be ruined shortly thereafter by a major flood. Soon after, during the Great Plague of London, Charles II held court in Salisbury's cathedral close.

Salisbury was the site chosen to assemble James II's forces to resist the Glorious Revolution. He arrived to lead his approximately 19 000 men on 19 November 1688. His troops were not keen to fight Mary or her husband William, and the loyalty of many of James's commanders was in doubt. The first blood was shed at the Wincanton Skirmish, in Somerset. In Salisbury, James heard that some of his officers had deserted, such as Edward Hyde, and he broke out in a nosebleed, which he took as an omen that he should retreat. His commander in chief, the Earl of Feversham, advised retreat on 23 November, and the next day John Churchill defected to William. On 26 November, James's own daughter, Princess Anne, did the same, and James returned to London the same day, never again to be at the head of a serious military force in England.

=== 20th and 21st centuries ===
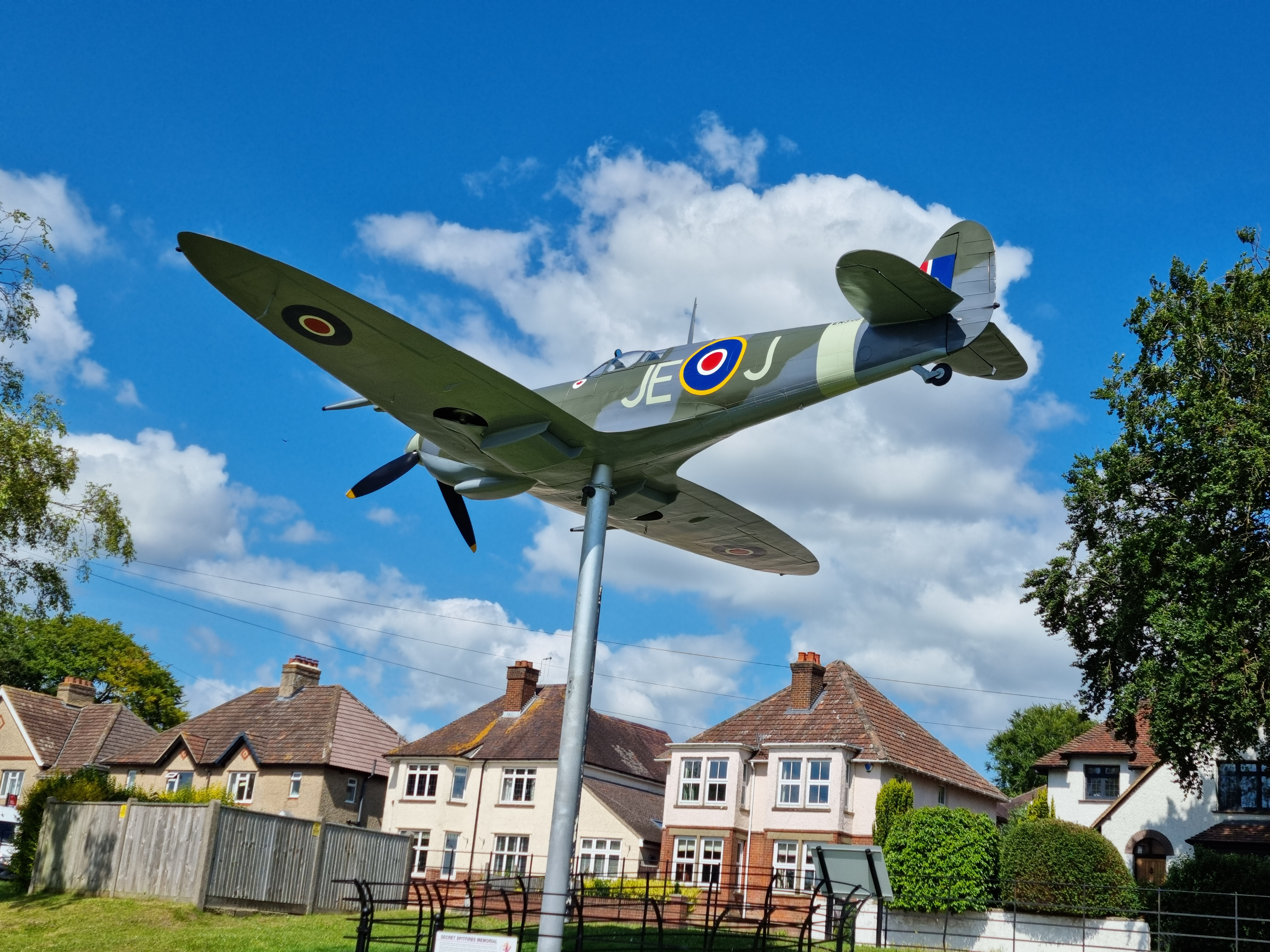
Secret Spitfire Memorial, view from the south

Following the destruction by the Luftwaffe of the Southampton factories building Supermarine Spitfires in 1940, production was dispersed to shadow factories elsewhere in the south of England. Salisbury was the major centre of production, supplemented by Trowbridge and Reading. Several factories were set up in the centre of Salisbury and staffed by predominantly young women who had no previous mechanical experience but were trained for specific tasks in the aircraft construction process. Supporting the factories were many workers producing small components in home-based workshops and garden sheds. Sub-assemblies were built in the city centre factories and then transported to High Post airfield (north of the city, in Durnford parish) and Chattis Hill (northeast, near Stockbridge), where the aircraft were assembled, test flown and then distributed to RAF airfields across England. A total of over 2000 Spitfires were produced. The whole process was carried out in secret without the knowledge of even the local people and only emerged into public knowledge after the production of a film describing the whole process. In July 2021 a memorial to the workers, in the form of a life-size fibreglass model Mk IX Spitfire, was unveiled in Castle Road, Salisbury (near the rugby club) on the site of one of the factories.

At the time of the 1948 Summer Olympics, held in London, a relay of runners carried the Olympic Flame from Wembley Stadium, where the Games were based, to the sailing centre at Torbay via Slough, Basingstoke, Salisbury, and Exeter.

The Local Government Act 1972 eliminated the administration of the City of New Sarum under its former charters, but its successor, Wiltshire County's Salisbury District, continued to be accorded its former city status. The name was finally formally amended from "New Sarum" to "Salisbury" during the 2009 changes occasioned by the Local Government Act 1992, which established the Salisbury City Council.

On 4 March 2018, former Russian double agent Sergei Skripal and his daughter, Yulia Skripal, were poisoned in Salisbury with a Novichok nerve agent.

== Governance ==
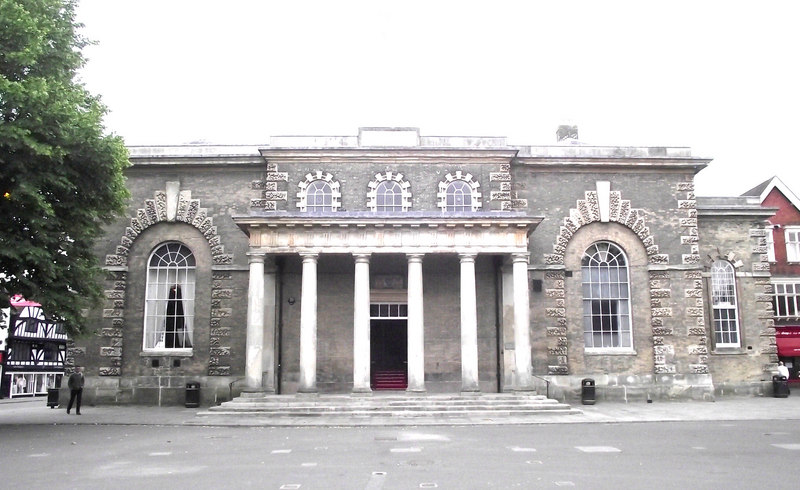
Salisbury Guildhall, completed in 1795, is now the meeting place of the City Council.

Salisbury is within the county of Wiltshire, and the administrative district of the same name. For local government purposes, it is administered by the Wiltshire Council unitary authority. Salisbury forms a civil parish with a parish council known as the Salisbury City Council.

Since the local boundary review of 2020, two electoral wards – St Edmund and Harnham East – cover the city centre within the A36 ring road, and the rest of the unitary and city council areas are covered by six further wards. Laverstock and Ford parish council has the same boundary as the Laverstock ward, as well as part of the Old Sarum and Upper Bourne Valley ward, at unitary level. The Bishopdown Farm estate on the outskirts of Salisbury is now part of Laverstock and Ford, joining Hampton Park and Riverdown Park.

Prior to 2009, Salisbury was part of the now-abolished non-metropolitan county of Wiltshire. It was governed by Wiltshire County Council at the county level and Salisbury District Council, which oversaw most of south Wiltshire as well as the city. Salisbury (previously officially New Sarum) has had city status since time immemorial.

The Member of Parliament for the Salisbury constituency, which includes the city, Wilton, Old Sarum, Laverstock and surrounding rural areas, is John Glen (Conservative), who was first elected in 2010.

== Geography ==
Salisbury is approximately halfway between Exeter and London being 80 miles (128 km) east-northeast of Exeter, 78 miles (126 km) west-southwest of London and also 34 miles (55 km) south of Swindon, 20 miles (32 km) northwest of Southampton and 32 miles (51 km) southeast of Bath.

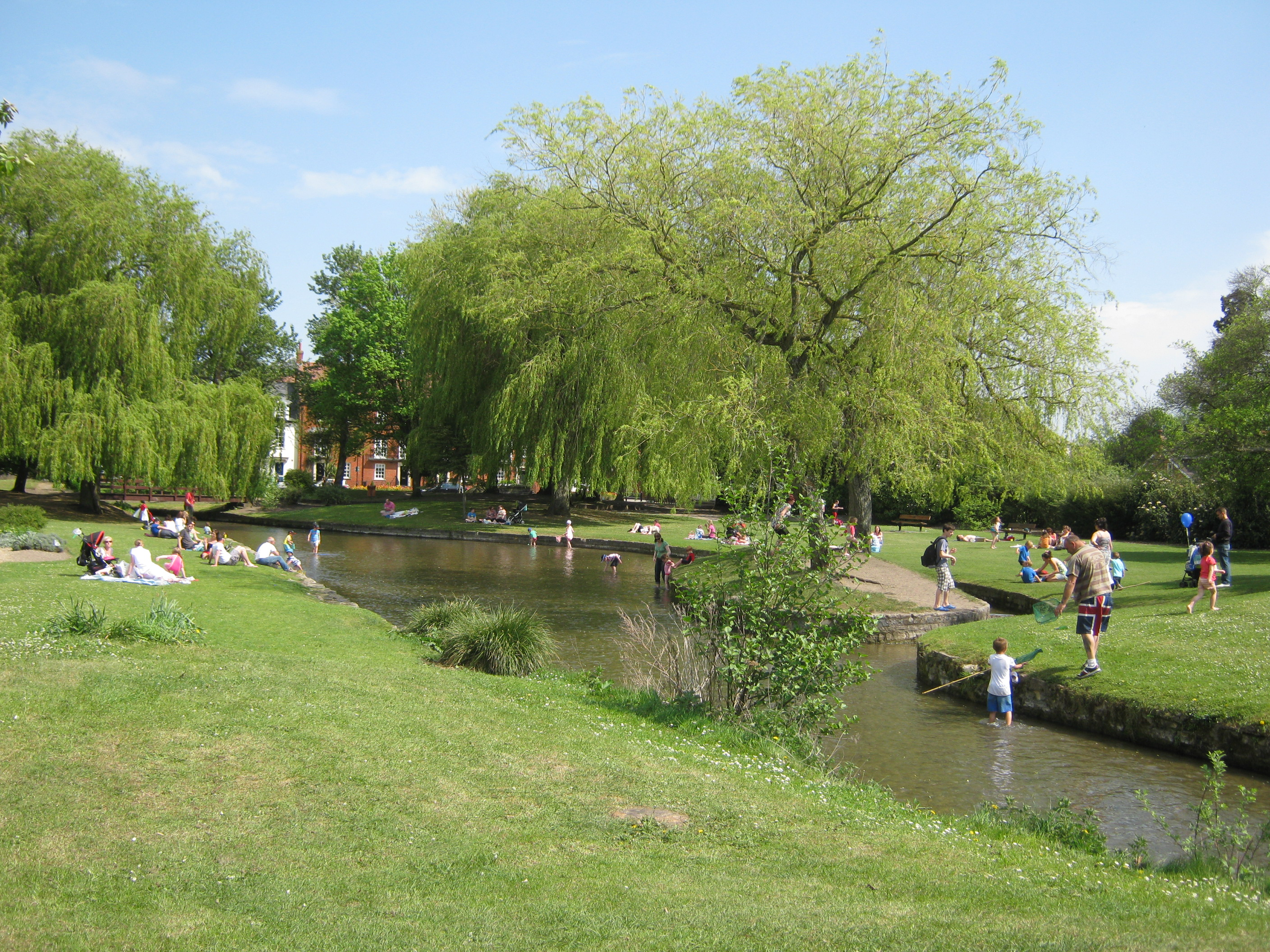
Queen Elizabeth Gardens, showing part of the River Avon diverted through the gardens

The geology of the area, as with much of South Wiltshire and Hampshire, is largely chalk. The rivers which flow through the city have been redirected, and along with landscaping, have been used to feed into public gardens. They are popular in the summer, particularly in Queen Elizabeth Gardens, as the water there is shallow and slow-flowing enough to enter safely. Because of the low-lying land, the rivers are prone to flooding, particularly during the winter months. The Town Path, a walkway that links Harnham with the rest of the city, is at times impassable.

Water-meadows at Harnham, fed by two branches of the River Nadder, are first documented in the 17th century. East Harnham Meadows, in the floodplain of the Avon, is a Site of Special Scientific Interest.

There are civil airfields at Old Sarum (where the experimental aircraft the Edgley Optica was developed and tested) and at Thruxton near Andover.

=== Areas and suburbs ===
Salisbury has many areas and suburbs, most of them being former villages that were absorbed by the growth of the city. The boundaries of these areas are for the most part unofficial and not fixed. All of these suburbs are within Salisbury's ONS Urban Area, which had a population of 44,748 in 2011. However, not all of these suburbs are administered by the city council, and are therefore not within the eight wards that had a combined population of 40,302 in 2011. Two parishes are part of the urban area but outside Salisbury parish.

- Bemerton
- Lower Bemerton
- Bemerton Heath
- Hampton Park
- Laverstock and Ford (outside city council area)
- City Centre
- Churchfields
- East Harnham
- West Harnham
- Harnham Hill
- Stratford-sub-Castle
- St Paul's
- St Francis
- Fisherton
- St Mark's
- Bishopdown
- Milford
- St Edmund
- Petersfinger
- Netherhampton (outside city council area)
- Paul's Dene
- Friary Estate (formerly known as Bugmore)
- St Martin's

Surrounding parishes, villages and towns rely on Salisbury for some services. The following are within a 4-mile radius of the city centre and are listed in approximately clockwise order:

- Britford
- Odstock
- Quidhampton
- Nunton
- Homington
- Old Sarum
- Little Durnford
- Fugglestone St Peter
- Alderbury
- Bodenham
- Downton
- Wilton
- Charlton All Saints
- Ditchampton
- Bulbridge
- Coombe Bissett
- Ugford
- South Newton
- Winterbourne Earls
- Winterbourne Gunner
- Winterbourne Dauntsey

== Demography ==
The civil parish of Salisbury, which does not include some of the city's suburbs such as Laverstock, Ford, Britford and Netherhampton, had a population of 40,302 at the 2011 census.

The urban zone, which contains the wards immediately surrounding the city, had a population of 62,216 at the 2011 Census. The wards included in this figure are Laverstock, Britford, Downton, Alderbury, Odstock and the neighbouring town of Wilton, among others, however it does not include the towns of Amesbury or Romsey, as these support their own local populations and are further afield.

At the 2011 census the population of the civil parish was 95.73% white (91.00% White British), 2.48% Asian (0.74% Indian, 0.41% Bangladeshi, 0.40% Chinese), 0.45% black and 1.15% mixed race. Within the parish, the largest ethnic minority group was 'other white' comprising 3.6% of the population as of 2011. There is not much contrast between areas when it comes to ethnic diversity. The ward of St Edmund and Milford is the most multiethnic, with 86.0% of the population being White British. The least multiethnic is the ward of St Francis and Stratford, which contains suburbs in the north of the city, with 94.8% of the population being White British. The city is represented by six other wards.

Ethnic Groups, 2011
	Salisbury CP	Salisbury UA	Wiltshire
White British	91.0%	91.3%	93.4%
Asian	2.5%	2.4%	1.3%
Black	0.5%	0.4%	0.7%

Within the parish, the largest ethnic minority group was 'other white' comprising 3.6% of the population as of 2011.

86.43% of the civil parish's population were born in England, 3.94% were born elsewhere in the UK. 4.94% were born elsewhere in the EU (including the Republic of Ireland), while 4.70% of the population were born outside the EU.

62.49% of the civil parish's population declared their religion to be Christianity, while 27.09% stated "no religion" and 8.02% declined to state their religion. 0.79% of the population declared their religion to be Islam, 0.41% Buddhism, 0.40% Hinduism and 0.80% as another religion.

95.89% of the civil parish's population considered their "main language" to be English, while 1.12% considered it to be Polish, 0.28% considered it to be Bengali and 0.24% considered it to be Tagalog. 99.43% of the population claimed to be able to speak English well or very well.

In 2001, 22.33% of Salisbury's population were aged between 30 and 44, 42.76% were over 45, and 13.3% were between 18 and 29.

== Economy ==
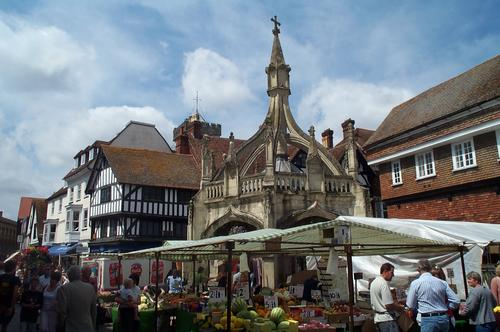
The 15th-century Poultry Cross marked the section of the market trading in poultry.

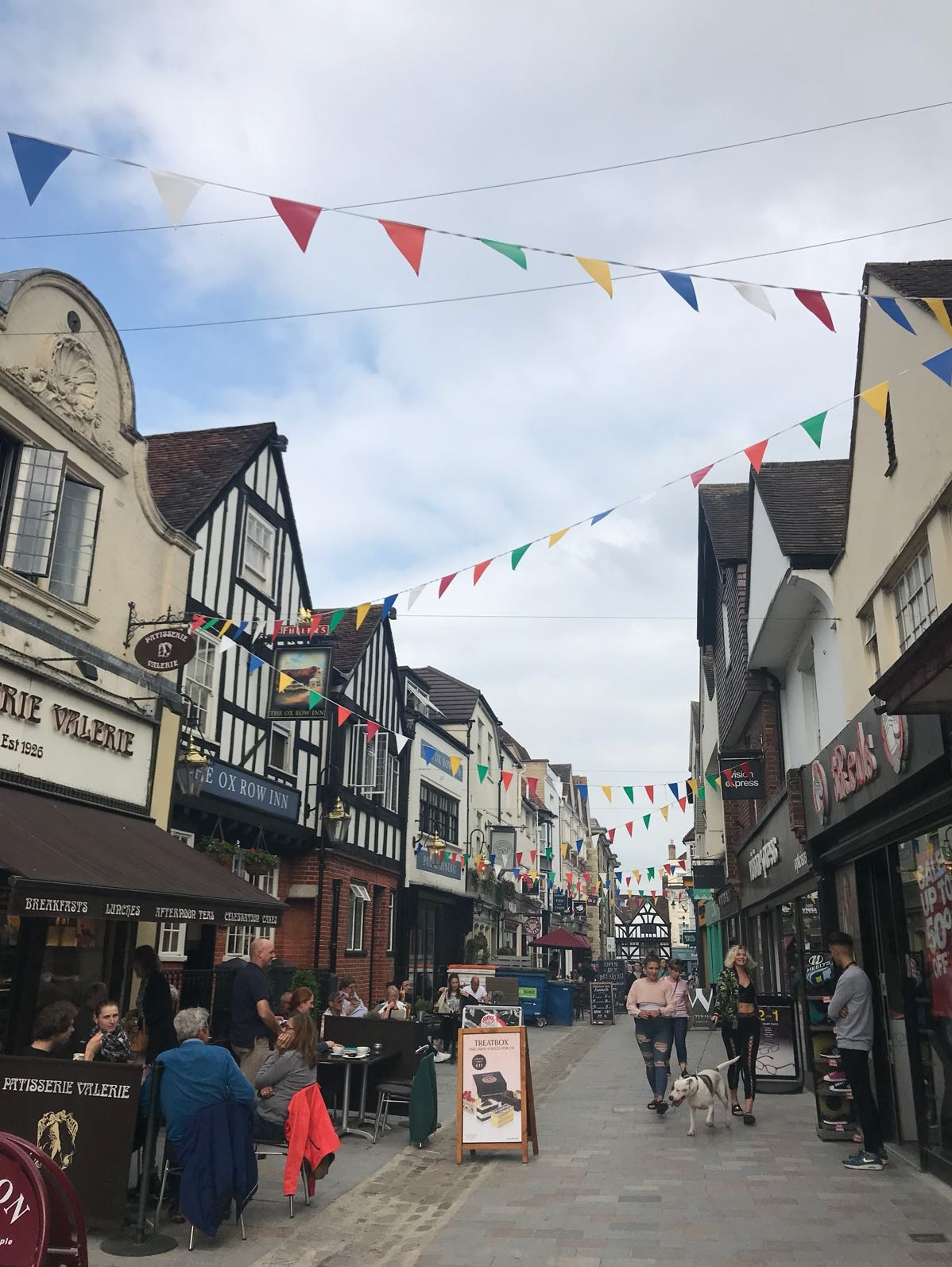
Butchers Row in the city centre

Salisbury holds a charter market on Tuesdays and Saturdays and has held markets regularly since 1227. In the 15th century the Market Place had four crosses: the Poultry Cross, whose name describes its market; the 'cheese and milk cross', which indicated that market and was in the triangle between the HSBC bank and the Salisbury Library; a third cross near the site of the present war memorial, which marked a woollen and yarn market; and a fourth, called Barnwell or Barnard's Cross, in the Culver Street and Barnard Street area, which marked a cattle and livestock market. Today, only the Poultry Cross remains, to which flying buttresses were added in the 19th century. The Market Hall, later known as the Corn Exchange, was completed in 1859.

In 1226, Henry III granted the Bishop of Salisbury a charter to hold a fair lasting eight days from the Feast of the Assumption of Mary (15 August). Over the centuries the dates of the fair have moved around, but in its modern guise, a funfair is now held in the Market Place for three days from the third Monday in October.

Salisbury Gas Act 1864
- Act of Parliament
- Parliament of the United Kingdom
- Long title: An Act for incorporating and granting other Powers to "The Salisbury Gaslight and Coke Company."
- Citation: 27 & 28 Vict. c. xxiii

Dates
- Royal assent: 13 May 1864

From 1833 to the mid-1980s, the Salisbury Gas Light and Coke Company, which ran the city's gasworks, was one of the major employers in the area. The company was formed in 1832 with a share capital of £8,000, and its first chairman was the 3rd Earl of Radnor. The company was incorporated by a local act of Parliament, the Salisbury Gas Act 1864 (27 & 28 Vict. c. xxiii), and the Salisbury Gas Order 1882 confirmed by the Gas Orders Confirmation Act 1882 (45 & 46 Vict. c. xcix) empowered it to raise capital of up to £40,000. At its peak, the gasworks were producing not only coal gas but also coke, which was sold off as the by-product of gas-making. Ammoniacal liquor, another by-product, was mixed with sulphuric acid, dried and ground to make a powder which was sold as an agricultural fertiliser. The clinker from the retort house was sold to a firm in London to be used as purifier beds in the construction of sewage works.

Salisbury power station supplied electricity to Salisbury and the surrounding area from 1898 to 1970. The power station was at Town Mill and was owned and operated by Salisbury Electric Light and Supply Company Limited prior to the nationalisation of the British electricity supply industry in 1948. The coal-fired power station was redeveloped several times to incorporate new plant including a water-driven turbine.

From the Middle Ages to the start of the 20th century, Salisbury was noted for its cutlery industry. Early motor cars were manufactured in the city from 1902 by Dean and Burden Brothers, using the Scout Motors brand. In 1907, the company moved to a larger factory at Churchfields; each car took six to eight weeks to build, mostly using bodies made elsewhere by coachbuilders. By 1912, 150 men were employed and the company was also making small commercial vehicles and 20-seater buses, some of which were later used by the newly established Wilts & Dorset operator. The Scout company failed in 1921 after wartime disruption and competition from larger makers.

Shopping centres include The Old George Mall, The Maltings, Winchester Street, and the Crosskeys precinct. Major employers include Salisbury District Hospital. The closure of the Friends Life office, the second largest employer, was announced in 2015.

== Culture ==
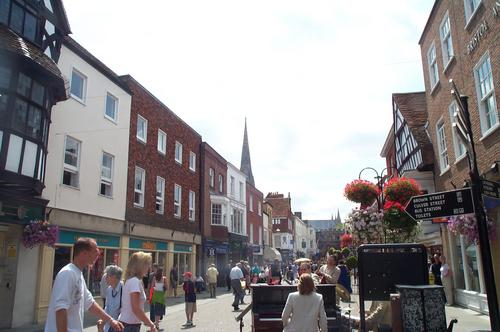
Salisbury High Street

Salisbury was an important centre for music in the 18th century. The grammarian James Harris, a friend of Handel, directed concerts at the Assembly Rooms for almost 50 years up to his death in 1780. Many of the most famous musicians and singers of the day performed there.

Salisbury holds an annual St George's Day pageant, the origins of which are claimed to go back to the 13th century.

Salisbury has a strong artistic community, with galleries situated in the city centre, including the Young Gallery (incorporating the John Creasey Museum), located in Salisbury Library. In the 18th century, John Constable made a number of celebrated landscape paintings featuring the cathedral's spire and the surrounding countryside. Salisbury's annual International Arts Festival, started in 1973, and held in late May to early June, provides a programme of theatre, live music, dance, public sculpture, street performance and art exhibitions. Salisbury also houses a producing theatre, Salisbury Playhouse, which produces between eight and ten plays a year, as well as welcoming touring productions.

=== The Salisbury Museum ===
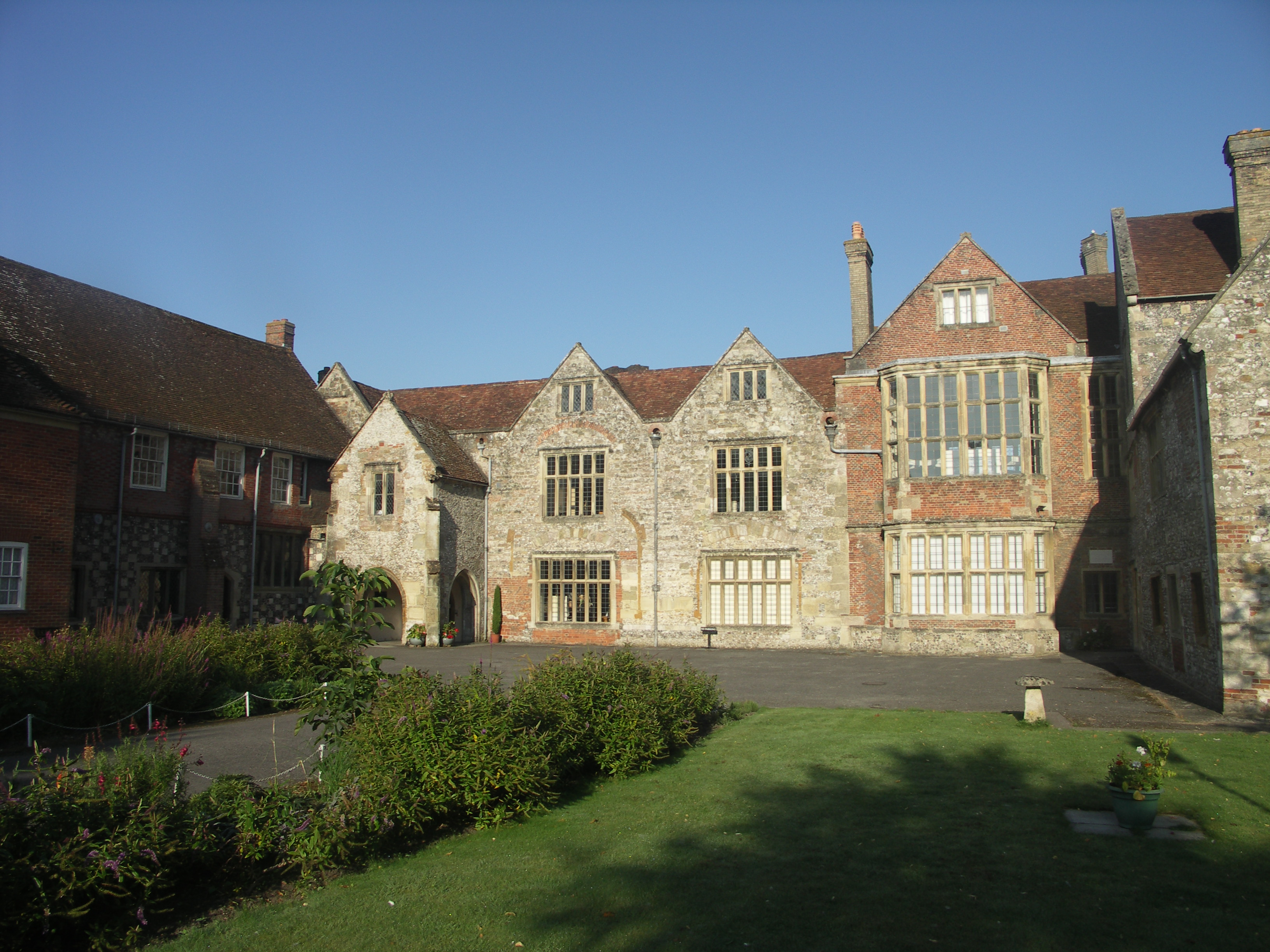
The Salisbury Museum, housed in the King's House

The Salisbury Museum is housed in the King's House, a Grade I listed building whose history dates back to the 13th century, opposite the west front of the cathedral.

The permanent Stonehenge exhibition gallery has interactive displays about Stonehenge and the archaeology of south Wiltshire, and its collections include the skeleton of the Amesbury Archer, which is on display. The Pitt Rivers display holds a collection from General Augustus Pitt Rivers. The costume gallery showcases costumes and textiles from the area, with costumes for children to try on while imagining themselves as characters from Salisbury's past.

The former home of Sir Edward Heath, Arundells in the Cathedral Close, is open as a museum.

== Twin towns and sister cities ==
Salisbury has been twinned with Saintes, France, since 1990, and with Xanten, Germany, since 2005. Salisbury is also a sister city of Salisbury, North Carolina and Salisbury, Maryland, both of which are in the United States.

== Education ==
In the 13th and 14th centuries, Salisbury was a seat of learning, with students of theology and the liberal arts taught at the College of the Valley Scholars, founded by Bishop Giles of Bridport in 1262. This has some claim to be seen as the first university college in England, as it was founded three years before Merton College, Oxford. Most of the scholars transferred to Salisbury Hall, Oxford, in 1325.

There are several schools in and around Salisbury. The city has the only grammar schools in Wiltshire, South Wilts Grammar School for girls and Bishop Wordsworth's School for boys; since September 2020, both have mixed sixth forms. Other schools in or near the city include Salisbury Cathedral School, Chafyn Grove School, Leehurst Swan School, the Godolphin senior and prep schools, Sarum Academy, St Joseph's Catholic School, and Wyvern St Edmund's.

Sixth-form education is offered by Salisbury Sixth Form College, while the Salisbury campus of Wiltshire College offers a range of further education courses, as well as some higher education courses in association with Bournemouth University. Sarum College is a Christian theological college, within the Cathedral close.

== Transport ==
=== Road ===
Salisbury lies at the intersection of the A30, the A36, and the A338, and is at the end of the A343, A345, A354, and A360. Car parks around the periphery of the city are linked to the city centre by a park-and-ride scheme. The A36 forms an almost complete ring road around the city centre, and the A3094 comprises the southwestern quadrant of the ring road, passing through the city's outer suburbs.

=== Bus ===
There are bus links to Southampton, Bournemouth, Andover, Devizes, and Swindon, with limited services on Sundays. Salisbury Reds, a brand of Go South Coast, is the main local operator. Wheelers Travel provide services to Shaftesbury and Andover, as well as intermediate-distance services. Other operators include Stagecoach (Amesbury, Tidworth, Andover) and Beeline (Warminster).

Salisbury has a park and ride bus scheme with five sites around the city.

Salisbury bus station, which opened in 1939, closed in January 2014 due to high operating costs and low usage. Situated in Endless Street, on the northeastern edge of the city centre, the site was later developed into retirement homes, which opened in February 2018.

=== Railways ===
Salisbury station is the crossing point of the West of England line, from London Waterloo to Exeter St Davids, and the Wessex Main Line from Bristol Temple Meads to Southampton Central. The station is operated by South Western Railway. Great Western Railway services run to/from Cardiff Central, Bristol Temple Meads, Bath Spa, Southampton Central and Portsmouth Harbour.

== Churches ==
Besides the cathedral church of the Blessed Virgin Mary, Salisbury has several churches of various denominations. Three of them – St Martin, St Thomas and St Lawrence (Stratford-sub-Castle) – are Grade I listed.

=== Medieval ===
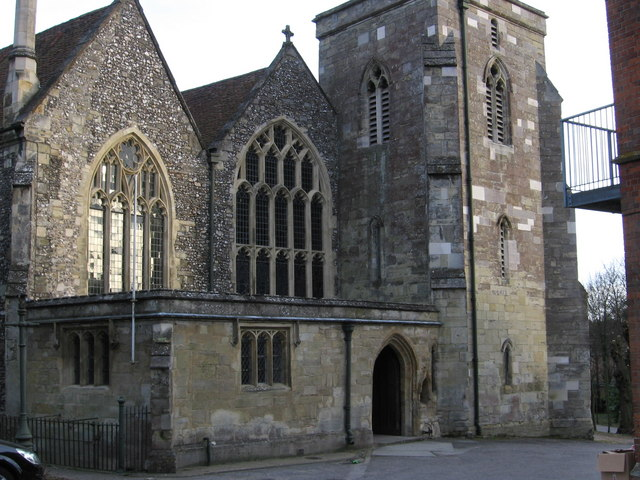
St Martin's Church (Church of England)

St Martin's Church predates the establishment of the cathedral at New Sarum. The church is on the south side of Milford Hill, beyond the eastern edge of the medieval town. The chancel is from c.1230, the tower (with spire) is 14th-century and the nave and aisles are from the late 15th century, but there is evidence of an earlier church and of Saxon burials. The parish has a long-standing Anglo-Catholic tradition.

St Edmund's was founded as a collegiate church in 1269, in the north of the city. It was originally a larger building which was damaged when the central tower fell in 1653; the nave was demolished and a new tower was built at the west end. A chancel was added in 1766 and then rebuilt in 1865–1867 by Sir George Gilbert Scott. The church was declared redundant in 1974 and reopened as Salisbury Arts Centre in 1975. A two-storey addition was built on the north side in 2003–2005.

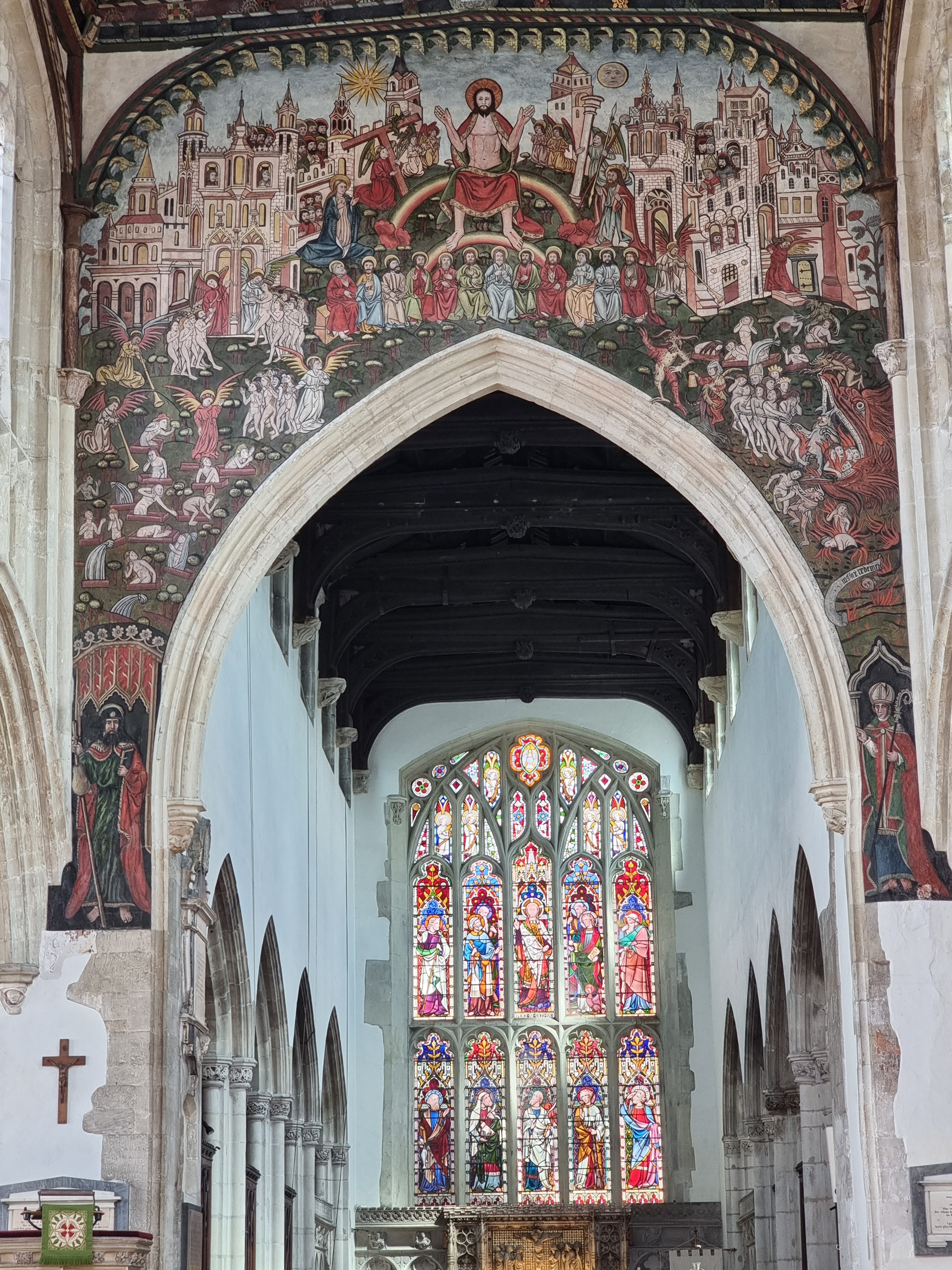
The 15th-century doom painting in St Thomas' church

St Thomas' church has a central position, just west of the market square. It was founded in the early 13th century and rebuilt in the 15th at the expense of the city's prosperous merchants. Above the chancel arch is a large 15th-century doom painting, "one of the best surviving" according to Orbach.

The churches of three rural parishes are in areas now absorbed into Salisbury. St George's at West Harnham was begun in the 12th century and altered in the early 14th century. St Lawrence, Stratford-sub-Castle, was built in the 13th century for the settlement near Old Sarum, at first as a chapelry of St Martin's. The small church of St Andrew at Bemerton was built in the 14th century on the site of an earlier church. It is associated with the poet and priest George Herbert, rector from 1630 until his death in 1633.

=== Early modern period ===
The first Baptist congregation in Salisbury was founded in 1690, as a breakaway from the Porton chapel. In 1719, a Baptist chapel was built in Brown Street, named the Brown Street Particular Baptist Church. It was rebuilt in 1750 and again in the 19th century.

The Methodist chapel on St. Edmund's Church Street was built in 1759, and hosted John Wesley in 1769.

A Presbyterian chapel was present on Salt Lane in the early 18th century, possibly on the site of the present day Salvation Army church.

=== 19th century ===
St Osmund's (Catholic) is on Exeter Street in the city centre, a short distance east of the cathedral. It was designed by Augustus Pugin, who also designed some of the stained glass, and was consecrated in 1848.

St Paul's church, serving part of the northern suburbs, was built near the start of the Devizes road in 1853. It was a replacement for St Clement's at Fisherton village, which had stood near the Nadder since at least the 14th century. The style of worship has been evangelical since the 1860s.

The small All Saints' church was built at East Harnham in 1854, to designs of T.H. Wyatt.

In 1861, St John's church was built at Bemerton to supplement St Andrew's. The building was declared redundant in 2010 and reopened in 2016 as a community centre and events venue.

St Mark's was dedicated in 1894 to serve the expanding northern suburbs. The church is described as "ambitious" by Historic England and "expensively detailed" by Orbach. Construction was in stages, finishing in 1915, and the upper part of the tower was never built.

The Methodist Church on St Edmund's Church Street was extended in 1811 and redesigned in 1835 in neo-classical style. It is a Grade II listed building.

The Baptist Church on Brown Street was rebuilt in 1829 to accommodate a growing congregation and modified further in 1882.

There were Congregational churches on Scots Lane and Endless Street, replaced by the current United Reformed church on Fisherton Street in 1897.

19th-century buildings for other denominations include, in the city centre, the Elim Pentecostal Church (originally Primitive Methodist, 1896, now a nightclub); and on Wilton Road, Emmanuel Church (1860).

=== 20th century ===
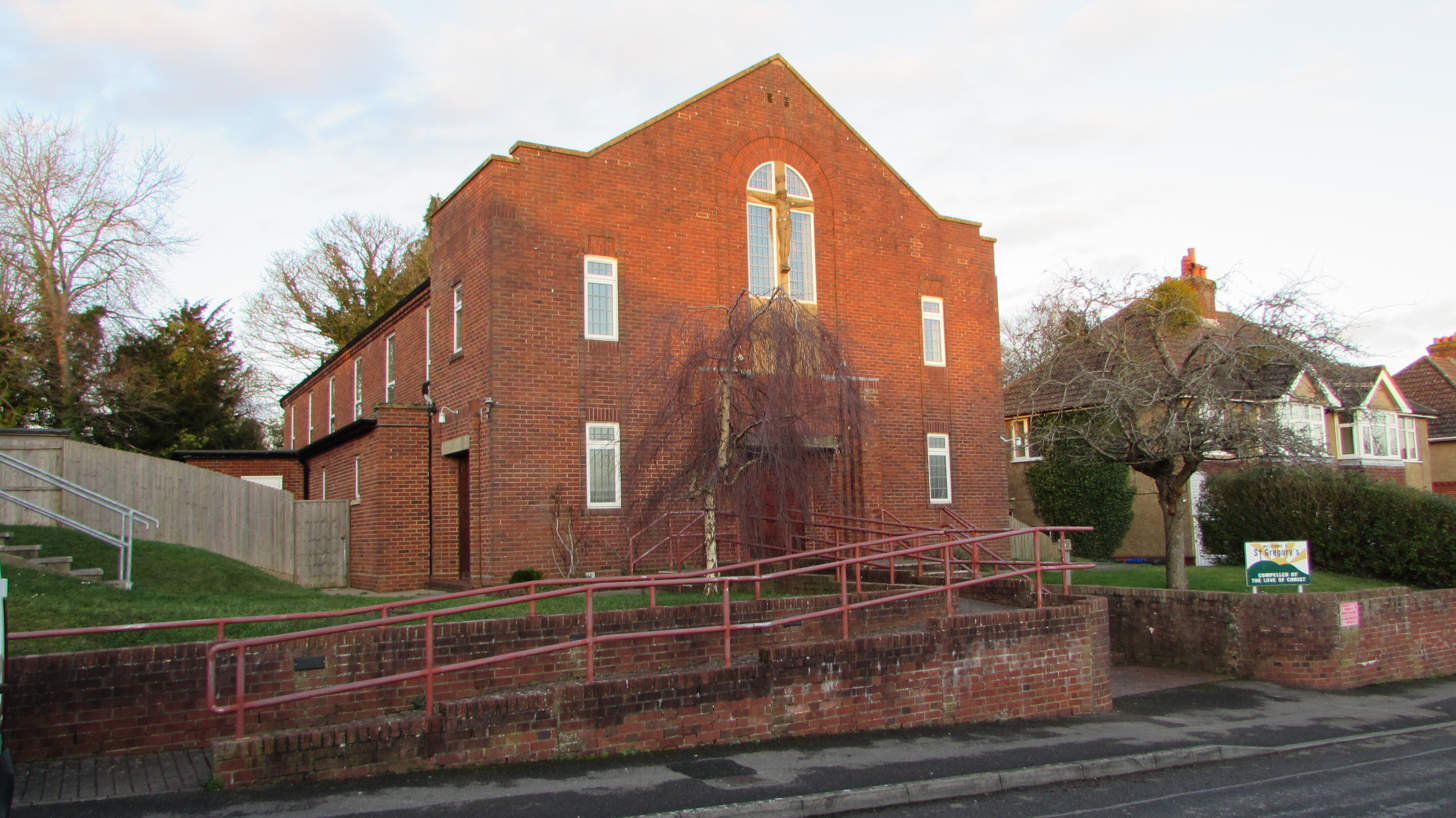
Church of St. Gregory and the English Martyrs, Salisbury (Roman Catholic)

The Roman Catholic St. Gregory's Church was built in the city's western suburbs in 1938.

As the city's suburbs extended further north, St Francis's church was consecrated in 1940 to serve an area which had been part of Stratford-sub-Castle parish. Worship is evangelical in style, and services are designed to appeal to families and young people.

== Sport and leisure ==
The city has a football team, Salisbury F.C., who play in the National League South and are based at the Raymond McEnhill Stadium, on the northern edge of the city. Other non-league clubs are Bemerton Heath Harlequins F.C. and Laverstock & Ford F.C.

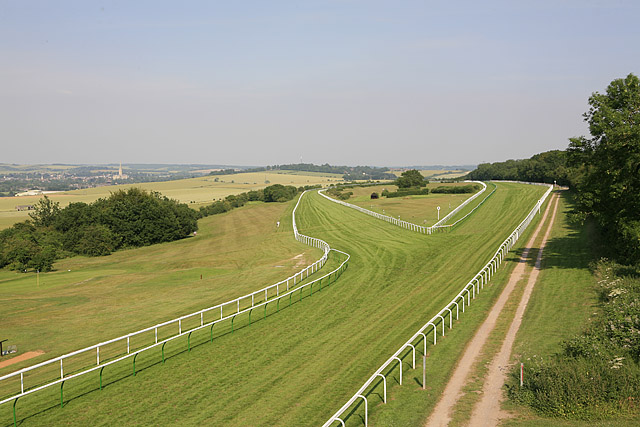
Salisbury Racecourse with the cathedral in the distance

Salisbury Rugby Club, which is based at Castle Road, plays in Southern Counties South. South Wilts Cricket Club is based at the Salisbury and South Wiltshire Sports Club and play in the Southern Premier Cricket League. Salisbury Hockey Club is also based at the Salisbury and South Wilts Sports Club.

The Five Rivers Leisure Centre and Swimming Pool, which was opened in 2002, is just outside the ring road. Salisbury Racecourse is a flat racing course to the south-west of the city. Five Rivers Indoor Bowls Club and Salisbury Snooker Club share a building on Tollgate Road, behind the college.

Old Sarum Airfield, north of the city centre, is home to a variety of aviation-based businesses, including flying schools and the APT Charitable Trust for disabled flyers.

The city's theatre is the Salisbury Playhouse. The City Hall is an entertainment venue and hosts comedy, musical performances (including those by the resident Musical Theatre Salisbury), as well as seminars and conventions. Salisbury Arts Centre, housed in a redundant church, has exhibitions and workshops.

Salisbury is well-supplied with pubs. The Haunch of Venison, overlooking the Poultry Cross, operates from a 14th-century building; one of its attractions is a cast of a mummified hand, supposedly severed during a game of cards. The Rai d'Or has original deeds dating from 1292. It was the home of Agnes Bottenham, who used the profits of the tavern to found Trinity Hospital next door in c. 1380.

== Notable people ==
=== Born before 1900 ===
- John of Salisbury (c. 1120–1180), author, educationalist, diplomat and bishop of Chartres, born at Salisbury
- Simon Forman (1552 in Quidhampton, Fugglestone St Peter – 1611), astrologer, occultist and herbalist
- John Bevis (1695 in Old Sarum – 1771), doctor, electrical researcher and astronomer. He discovered the Crab Nebula in 1731.
- James Harris (1709–1780), politician and grammarian, born and educated in Salisbury
- James Harris, 1st Earl of Malmesbury (1746 in Salisbury – 1820), diplomat, politician and MP
- Sir John Stoddart (1773 in Salisbury – 1856), writer and lawyer, and editor of The Times
- Sir George Staunton, 2nd Baronet (1781 at Milford House near Salisbury – 1859), traveller and Orientalist
- Henry Fawcett (1833 in Salisbury – 1884), academic, statesman and economist
- John Neville Keynes (1852 in Salisbury – 1949), economist, father of John Maynard Keynes
- Sir James Macklin (1864 in Harnham – 1944), jeweller, farmer and six times Mayor of Salisbury, from 1913 to 1919
- Herbert Ponting (1870 in Salisbury – 1935), professional photographer, expedition photographer and cinematographer for Robert Falcon Scott's Terra Nova Expedition
- Lieutenant James Cromwell Bush (1891 in Salisbury – 1917), World War I flying ace
- Lieutenant Colonel Tom Edwin Adlam (1893 in Salisbury – 1975), recipient of the Victoria Cross

=== Since 1900 ===
- William Golding (1911–1993), novelist, schoolteacher. He taught philosophy (1939) and English (1945–1961) at Bishop Wordsworth's School.
- Jill Furse (1915 in Salisbury – 1944), actress
- Edward Heath (1916–2005), Conservative Prime Minister 1970–1974, lived in Arundells on Cathedral Green in Salisbury from 1985 until his death
- Daphne Pochin Mould (1920 in Salisbury – 2014), photographer, broadcaster, geologist, traveller, pilot and Ireland's first female flight instructor
- John Rowan (1925 in Old Sarum – 2018 in London), author, one of the pioneers of Humanistic Psychology and Integrative Psychotherapy
- David Elsworth (born in 1939 in Salisbury), racehorse trainer, horses included Desert Orchid and Rhyme 'n' Reason
- Iona Brown (1941 in Salisbury – 2004 in Salisbury), violinist and conductor. From 1968 to 2004 she lived in Bowerchalke.
- Ray Teret (1941 in Salisbury – 2021), radio disc jockey and convicted rapist, sentenced to 25 years in prison in 2014
- Michael Crawford (born 1942), actor and singer, originated the title role in the musical The Phantom of the Opera
- Sir Jeffrey Tate (1943 in Salisbury – 2017), conductor of classical music
- John Rhys-Davies (born in 1944 in Salisbury), actor known for playing Gimli in The Lord of the Rings film series
- Anthony Daniels (born in 1946 in Salisbury), actor known for playing C-3PO in the Star Wars franchise
- Jonathan Meades (born 1947 in Salisbury), writer, food journalist, essayist and film-maker
- Prof. Martyn Thomas (born 1948 in Salisbury) software engineer, entrepreneur and academic
- Richard Digance (born 1949), comedian and folk singer. He lives in Salisbury.
- Kenneth Macdonald, Baron Macdonald of River Glaven (born 1953), Director of Public Prosecutions of England and Wales 2003–2008 and head of the Crown Prosecution Service. He attended Bishop Wordsworth's School in Salisbury.
- Carolyn Browne (born 1958), diplomat, Ambassador to Kazakhstan. She attended South Wilts Grammar School for Girls.
- Teresa Dent (born 1959), CEO of Game & Wildlife Conservation Trust, lives in Salisbury
- Martin Foyle (born 1963 in Salisbury), footballer and manager. He played 533 League games, scoring 155 goals.
- Dave Dee, Dozy, Beaky, Mick & Tich (formed 1964), 1960s pop/rock group, most of whom came from Salisbury or Wiltshire
- Clare Moody (born 1965), Labour Member of the European Parliament for South West England 2014–2019, lives in Salisbury
- Joseph Fiennes (born 1970 in Salisbury), film and stage actor, educated in the town
- David Mitchell (born 1974 in Salisbury), comedian, actor, writer and television presenter
- Max Waller (born 1988 in Salisbury), cricketer, who plays for Somerset County Cricket Club
- Henni Zuël (born 1990 in Salisbury), professional golfer; youngest player to join the Ladies European Tour as an amateur
- James Marriott (born 1997), musician and YouTuber who went to Bishop Wordsworth's School from 2013 to 2015
- John Bennett (born 2003 in Salisbury), racing driver

== Media ==
BBC Radio Wiltshire is the BBC Local Radio public service station for the county, which sometimes broadcasts from or about the city. Salisbury used to have its own local radio station, Spire FM, which was purchased by Bauer Radio in 2019. Its frequency now transmits Greatest Hits Radio Salisbury, which broadcasts national and regional music programmes with local news bulletins.

Regional television services are provided by BBC South and ITV Meridian, and a local television channel "That's Salisbury" is provided by That's TV.

The Salisbury Journal is the local paid-for weekly newspaper, which is available in shops every Thursday. The local free weekly newspaper from the same publisher is the Avon Advertiser, which is delivered to houses in Salisbury and the surrounding area.

The SalisburyPost is a local online news publication covering Salisbury, Wiltshire and surrounding areas.

== In popular culture ==
The two names for the city, Salisbury and Sarum, are humorously alluded to in a 1928 limerick from Punch:

There was an old Sultan of Salisbury
Who wanted some wives for his halisbury,
So he had them sent down
By a fast train from town,
For he thought that his motor would scalisbury.

The ambiguous pronunciation was also used in the following limerick, which also alludes to 'Hants', the shortened form of Hampshire:

There was a young curate of Salisbury,
Whose manners were quite Halisbury-Scalisbury.
He wandered round Hampshire,
Without any pampshire,
Till the Vicar compelled him to Walisbury.

- Salisbury is the origin of "Melchester" in Thomas Hardy's novels, such as Jude the Obscure (1895).
- A lively account of the Salisbury markets, as they were in 1842, is contained in Chapter 5 of Martin Chuzzlewit by Charles Dickens.
- The fictitious Kingsbridge Cathedral in TV miniseries, The Pillars of the Earth (2010), based on a historical novel by the same name by Ken Follett, is modelled on the cathedrals of Wells and Salisbury. The final aerial shot of the series is of Salisbury Cathedral.
- Kate Bush cites the city on the first song of her 1982 album The Dreaming.
- The 1987 novel Sarum by Edward Rutherfurd describes the history of Salisbury.
- The novel The Spire by William Golding tells the story of the building of the spire of an unnamed cathedral similar to Salisbury Cathedral.
- Band Uriah Heep released an album and song called Salisbury in 1971.
- Progressive rock band Big Big Train wrote two songs in their Folklore album in which the Salisbury Giant appears.
- The Salisbury Poisonings is a three-part television drama which portrays the 2018 Novichok poisoning crisis, first broadcast on BBC One in June 2020.

== Climate ==
Salisbury experiences an oceanic climate (Köppen climate classification Cfb) similar to almost all of the United Kingdom. The nearest Met Office weather station to Salisbury is Boscombe Down, about 6 miles to the north of the city centre. In terms of the local climate, Salisbury is among the sunniest of inland areas in the UK, averaging over 1650 hours of sunshine in a typical year. Temperature extremes since 1960 have ranged from −12.4 °C (9.7 °F) in January 1963 to 34.5 °C (94.1 °F) during July 2006. The lowest temperature to be recorded in recent years was −10.1 °C (13.8 °F) during December 2010.

Climate data for Boscombe Down, (Note: Weather station is located 7.0 miles (11.3 km) from the Salisbury city centre.) elevation: 128 m (420 ft), (1991–2020 normals, extremes 1957–present)
Month	Jan	Feb	Mar	Apr	May	Jun	Jul	Aug	Sep	Oct	Nov	Dec	Year
Record high °C (°F)	15.0 (59.0)	17.5 (63.5)	21.3 (70.3)	25.8 (78.4)	27.4 (81.3)	33.7 (92.7)	34.9 (94.8)	34.2 (93.6)	30.0 (86.0)	26.2 (79.2)	17.6 (63.7)	14.6 (58.3)	34.9 (94.8)
Mean daily maximum °C (°F)	7.6 (45.7)	8.1 (46.6)	10.7 (51.3)	13.7 (56.7)	17.0 (62.6)	19.8 (67.6)	22.1 (71.8)	21.6 (70.9)	18.9 (66.0)	14.7 (58.5)	10.6 (51.1)	8.0 (46.4)	14.4 (57.9)
Daily mean °C (°F)	4.6 (40.3)	4.9 (40.8)	6.8 (44.2)	9.1 (48.4)	12.3 (54.1)	15.0 (59.0)	17.1 (62.8)	16.9 (62.4)	14.5 (58.1)	11.1 (52.0)	7.4 (45.3)	5.0 (41.0)	10.4 (50.7)
Mean daily minimum °C (°F)	1.6 (34.9)	1.6 (34.9)	2.9 (37.2)	4.5 (40.1)	7.5 (45.5)	10.2 (50.4)	12.1 (53.8)	12.2 (54.0)	10.1 (50.2)	7.5 (45.5)	4.2 (39.6)	2.0 (35.6)	6.4 (43.5)
Record low °C (°F)	−12.4 (9.7)	−10.0 (14.0)	−9.6 (14.7)	−4.7 (23.5)	−2.4 (27.7)	−0.1 (31.8)	4.4 (39.9)	3.6 (38.5)	−0.1 (31.8)	−3.4 (25.9)	−7.2 (19.0)	−11.3 (11.7)	−12.4 (9.7)
Average precipitation mm (inches)	79.5 (3.13)	57.3 (2.26)	53.8 (2.12)	55.0 (2.17)	49.9 (1.96)	53.7 (2.11)	55.1 (2.17)	59.1 (2.33)	57.8 (2.28)	85.7 (3.37)	90.9 (3.58)	85.2 (3.35)	783.0 (30.83)
Average precipitation days (≥ 1.0 mm)	12.5	10.5	9.7	9.5	9.0	8.8	8.6	9.6	9.0	12.3	12.8	12.6	125.0
Mean monthly sunshine hours	62.1	79.4	124.4	178.9	211.8	216.1	223.5	199.4	155.9	112.9	75.0	59.9	1,699.2
Source 1: Met Office
Source 2: Starlings Roost Weather

== Freedom of the City ==
The following people and military units have received the Freedom of the City of Salisbury.

=== Individuals ===
- Horatio Nelson, 1st Viscount Nelson: 1800.

=== Military units ===
- The Royal Wiltshire Yeomanry: 1944.
- Royal Gloucestershire, Berkshire and Wiltshire Regiment: October 2004.
- The Rifles: 20 November 2010.
- 32nd Regiment, Royal Artillery: 7 July 2016.
- The Royal Military Police: 13 June 2018.

== See also ==
- List of Grade I listed buildings in Salisbury
- Listed buildings in Salisbury (city centre)
- Listed buildings in Salisbury (The Close)
- Listed buildings in Salisbury (outside the city centre)
