= Listed buildings in Salisbury (outside the city centre) =

Non-Civil Parish in Hampshire, England

Salisbury is a cathedral city and civil parish in Wiltshire, England. It contains 641 listed buildings that are recorded in the National Heritage List for England. Of these 38 are grade I, 139 are grade II* and 464 are grade II.

This list is based on the information retrieved online from Historic England. The quantity of listed buildings in Salisbury requires subdivision into geographically defined lists. This list includes all listed buildings located in the city center outside the city centre.

== Key ==
Grade	Criteria
I	Buildings that are of exceptional interest
II*	Particularly important buildings of more than special interest
II	Buildings that are of special interest

== Listing ==
Name	Grade	Location	Type	Completed (Note: The date given is the date used by Historic England as significant for the initial building or that of an important part in the structure's description.)	Grid ref. (Note: The grid reference is based on the British national grid reference system, sometimes known as OSGB36, used by the Ordnance Survey.) Geo-coordinates	Notes	Entry number (Note: The "List Entry Number" is a unique number assigned to each listed building and scheduled monument by Historic England.)	Image	Wikidata
Remains of Old Sarum Castle and Cathedral	I		cathedral		SU1375832699; 51°05′36″N 1°48′18″W		1248682	Remains of Old Sarum Castle and Cathedral More images	Q3663693
Salisbury Crematorium	II	Barrington Road, SP1 3JB			SU1528331339; 51°04′52″N 1°47′00″W		1410876	Upload Photo	Q26676180
Council House	II*	Bourne Hill	house		SU1473630355; 51°04′20″N 1°47′28″W		1023544	Council House More images	Q17534582
Memorial Urn in North West Corner of the Grounds of the Council House	II	Bourne Hill			SU1477230469; 51°04′24″N 1°47′26″W		1277751	Upload Photo	Q26567145
Porch Or Pavilion in the South East Corner of the Grounds of the Council House	II	Bourne Hill			SU1486130353; 51°04′20″N 1°47′21″W		1355854	Upload Photo	Q26638572
Sundial in Grounds of Council House	II	Bourne Hill			SU1475630354; 51°04′20″N 1°47′27″W		1023545	Upload Photo	Q26274527
Two Urns Placed Either Side of Canted Bays on East Garden Front of the Council House	II	Bourne Hill			SU1475430346; 51°04′20″N 1°47′27″W		1248780	Upload Photo	Q26540968
Walls Either Side of Entrance to Gardens Separating Them from Forecourt of Council House	II	Bourne Hill			SU1475130332; 51°04′20″N 1°47′27″W		1355853	Upload Photo	Q26638571
Western Boundary Wall and Return Section with Doorway to Street of the Council House	II	Bourne Hill			SU1471830326; 51°04′19″N 1°47′29″W		1248771	Upload Photo	Q26540960
Church of St Francis	II	Castle Road	church building		SU1434931549; 51°04′59″N 1°47′47″W		1243667	Church of St Francis More images	Q16900471
Milestone Immediately West of Church of St Francis of Assisi	II	Castle Road			SU1430731529; 51°04′58″N 1°47′50″W		1243653	Upload Photo	Q26536320
124-128, Castle Street	II	124-128, Castle Street			SU1439030394; 51°04′22″N 1°47′46″W		1249119	Upload Photo	Q26541282
132, Castle Street	II	132, Castle Street			SU1438830407; 51°04′22″N 1°47′46″W		1023568	Upload Photo	Q26274553
136-140, Castle Street	II	136-140, Castle Street			SU1439030420; 51°04′23″N 1°47′46″W		1249137	Upload Photo	Q26541300
142 and 144, Castle Street	II	142 and 144, Castle Street			SU1438930432; 51°04′23″N 1°47′46″W		1023569	Upload Photo	Q26274554
Milford Hall	II*	206, Castle Street	house		SU1434730632; 51°04′29″N 1°47′48″W		1355865	Milford Hall More images	Q17546423
Cherbury	II	Church Lane, Lower Bemerton			SU1235630619; 51°04′29″N 1°49′30″W		1243441	Upload Photo	Q26536120
The Hermitage	II	6, Crane Bridge Road			SU1404429949; 51°04′07″N 1°48′03″W		1355819	Upload Photo	Q26638552
The Poplars	II	8, Crane Bridge Road			SU1402029987; 51°04′09″N 1°48′05″W		1023635	Upload Photo	Q26274598
Milepost 100 Metres South of Junction with the Avenue	II	Devizes Road			SU1139333462; 51°06′01″N 1°50′19″W		1284376	Upload Photo	Q26573152
Water Board Pumping Station	II	Devizes Road			SU1331330855; 51°04′37″N 1°48′41″W		1355823	Upload Photo	Q26638554
Harnham Lodge	II	Downton Road, East Harnham			SU1469228625; 51°03′24″N 1°47′30″W		1240913	Upload Photo	Q26533809
St Paul's Home	II	1-6, Fisherton Street	almshouse		SU1380930270; 51°04′18″N 1°48′15″W		1242034	St Paul's Home More images	Q26534866
13, Fisherton Street	II	13, Fisherton Street			SU1411430012; 51°04′09″N 1°48′00″W		1242115	Upload Photo	Q26534939
38 and 40, Fisherton Street	II	38 and 40, Fisherton Street			SU1413130021; 51°04′10″N 1°47′59″W		1023668	Upload Photo	Q26274623
45 and 47, Fisherton Street	II	45 and 47, Fisherton Street			SU1405230062; 51°04′11″N 1°48′03″W		1023670	Upload Photo	Q26274625
59-63, Fisherton Street	II	59-63, Fisherton Street			SU1402830079; 51°04′12″N 1°48′04″W		1023671	Upload Photo	Q26274626
65, Fisherton Street	II	65, Fisherton Street			SU1402230083; 51°04′12″N 1°48′05″W		1260169	Upload Photo	Q26551222
89-93, Fisherton Street	II*	89-93, Fisherton Street			SU1393730124; 51°04′13″N 1°48′09″W		1355798	89-93, Fisherton Street	Q17546333
Church of St Paul	II	Fisherton Street	church building		SU1382230331; 51°04′20″N 1°48′15″W		1355796	Church of St Paul More images	Q7595153
Clock Tower Including Part of Former County Jail	II	Fisherton Street	clock tower		SU1420229946; 51°04′07″N 1°47′55″W		1260194	Clock Tower Including Part of Former County Jail More images	Q26551244
Congregational Church	II	Fisherton Street	church building		SU1418130003; 51°04′09″N 1°47′56″W		1355795	Congregational Church More images	Q26638536
Former Gwr Station	II	Fisherton Street			SU1377530210; 51°04′16″N 1°48′17″W		1242134	Upload Photo	Q26534953
General Infirmary	II	Fisherton Street			SU1413429958; 51°04′08″N 1°47′59″W		1023669	Upload Photo	Q26274624
London Hotel	II	Fisherton Street			SU1378030246; 51°04′17″N 1°48′17″W		1023672	Upload Photo	Q26274627
The Bull Public House	II	Fisherton Street			SU1411930008; 51°04′09″N 1°48′00″W		1355797	Upload Photo	Q26638538
2-14, Harnham Road	II	2-14, Harnham Road, East Harnham			SU1431629004; 51°03′37″N 1°47′50″W		1023676	Upload Photo	Q26274631
Rose and Crown Terrace	II	53-61, Harnham Road, East Harnham			SU1422428879; 51°03′33″N 1°47′54″W		1023678	Upload Photo	Q26274633
All Saints School	II	Harnham Road, East Harnham			SU1411928906; 51°03′34″N 1°48′00″W		1355802	Upload Photo	Q26638541
Church of All Saints	II	Harnham Road, East Harnham	church building		SU1408428906; 51°03′34″N 1°48′01″W		1242276	Church of All Saints More images	Q26535081
Churchyard Wall to Road of All Saints Church	II	Harnham Road, East Harnham			SU1409628893; 51°03′33″N 1°48′01″W		1023677	Upload Photo	Q26274632
Old Parsonage	II	Harnham Road, West Harnham			SU1358629117; 51°03′40″N 1°48′27″W		1260123	Upload Photo	Q26551177
Outbuilding to East of Old Parsonage	II	Harnham Road, West Harnham			SU1360429111; 51°03′40″N 1°48′26″W		1355803	Upload Photo	Q26638542
Outbuilding to West of Old Parsonage	II	Harnham Road, West Harnham			SU1355129138; 51°03′41″N 1°48′29″W		1023679	Upload Photo	Q26274635
The Rose and Crown Inn	II*	Harnham Road, East Harnham	hotel		SU1428428983; 51°03′36″N 1°47′51″W		1242271	The Rose and Crown Inn More images	Q17543756
London Road Inn	II*	London Road	inn		SU1485430049; 51°04′10″N 1°47′22″W		1023693	London Road Inn More images	Q17539109
64, Lower Road	II	64, Lower Road			SU1257230469; 51°04′24″N 1°49′19″W		1355769	Upload Photo	Q26638511
Bemerton House	II	71, Lower Road, Bemerton			SU1268730417; 51°04′23″N 1°49′13″W		1355770	Upload Photo	Q26638512
76, Lower Road	II	76, Lower Road, Bemerton			SU1252730505; 51°04′25″N 1°49′21″W		1023694	Upload Photo	Q26274647
The Manor House	II	83, Lower Road, Bemerton			SU1266730460; 51°04′24″N 1°49′14″W		1039166	Upload Photo	Q26290954
86, Lower Road	II	86, Lower Road, Bemerton			SU1247130497; 51°04′25″N 1°49′24″W		1243545	Upload Photo	Q26536217
Bemerton Rectory	II*	Lower Road	house		SU1233730522; 51°04′26″N 1°49′31″W		1065774	Bemerton Rectory More images	Q17542774
Bridge House	II	Lower Road, Bemerton			SU1266630361; 51°04′21″N 1°49′14″W		1260010	Upload Photo	Q26551074
Church of St Andrew	II*	Lower Road, Bemerton	church building		SU1233730538; 51°04′27″N 1°49′31″W		1023696	Church of St Andrew More images	Q17539122
Church of St John	II*	Lower Road, Bemerton	church building		SU1207430603; 51°04′29″N 1°49′45″W		1374113	Church of St John More images	Q17546790
Complex of Farm Buildings Including Dovecote and Labouers Cottage at Bemerton Farm	II	Lower Road			SU1180630737; 51°04′33″N 1°49′58″W		1243540	Upload Photo	Q26536212
Riversfield	II	Lower Road, Bemerton			SU1239730554; 51°04′27″N 1°49′28″W		1023695	Upload Photo	Q26274648
Little Manor	II	Manor Farm Road, Milford			SU1550929832; 51°04′03″N 1°46′48″W		1355771	Upload Photo	Q26638513
Hillcote	II	Manor Road			SU1504230338; 51°04′20″N 1°47′12″W		1245581	Upload Photo	Q26538097
The Cottages	II	5-9, Middle Street, West Harnham			SU1353929151; 51°03′42″N 1°48′29″W		1242792	Upload Photo	Q26535531
The Laurels	II	20, Middle Street, West Harnham			SU1339229383; 51°03′49″N 1°48′37″W		1242835	Upload Photo	Q26535566
Church of St George	II*	Middle Street, West Harnham	church building		SU1343229266; 51°03′45″N 1°48′35″W		1242798	Church of St George More images	Q17543786
Elim Hunters Cottage the Old Cottage	II	Middle Street, West Harnham			SU1347729325; 51°03′47″N 1°48′33″W		1242800	Upload Photo	Q26535538
Manor Farmhouse	II	Middle Street, West Harnham			SU1348729247; 51°03′45″N 1°48′32″W		1242796	Upload Photo	Q26535535
Old Mill Flats the Three Crowns Public House	II	Middle Street, West Harnham			SU1347129353; 51°03′48″N 1°48′33″W		1242808	Upload Photo	Q26535544
The Old House (also Known As the Old Fuel Store) with Attached Outbuilding	II	Middle Street, Harnham			SU1302529437; 51°03′51″N 1°48′56″W		1243576	Upload Photo	Q26536244
93, Milford Hill	II	93, Milford Hill			SU1488729919; 51°04′06″N 1°47′20″W		1242838	Upload Photo	Q26535568
94 and 96, Milford Hill	II	94 and 96, Milford Hill			SU1486129894; 51°04′05″N 1°47′21″W		1259859	Upload Photo	Q26550941
Milford Hill House (youth Hostel)	II	Milford Hill			SU1497529992; 51°04′09″N 1°47′16″W		1242882	Upload Photo	Q26535607
Summer House at Milford Manor	II*	Milford Mill Road			SU1559629682; 51°03′59″N 1°46′44″W		1272838	Upload Photo	Q17545804
2-5, Mill Road (see Details for Further Address Information)	II	2-5, Mill Race Close			SU1373929984; 51°04′08″N 1°48′19″W		1272875	Upload Photo	Q26562678
Nursing Home	II	4, Mill Road			SU1394529944; 51°04′07″N 1°48′08″W		1258081	Upload Photo	Q26549365
Clements Cottage	II	Mill Road, SP2 7RZ			SU1375529995; 51°04′09″N 1°48′18″W		1251505	Upload Photo	Q26543460
Fisherton Mill	II*	Mill Road	mill		SU1374429918; 51°04′06″N 1°48′19″W		1258197	Fisherton Mill More images	Q17544117
Wall Extending East from Milford Manor	II	Mlford Mill Road			SU1557029816; 51°04′03″N 1°46′45″W		1272778	Upload Photo	Q26562590
Scammells Bridge	II	Nelson Road			SU1422230678; 51°04′31″N 1°47′54″W		1243670	Upload Photo	Q26536337
Old School	II	2, Netherhampton Road, West Hanham			SU1352829129; 51°03′41″N 1°48′30″W		1258223	Upload Photo	Q26549483
Old Castle Inn	II	Old Castle Road	inn		SU1414432492; 51°05′30″N 1°47′58″W		1258431	Old Castle Inn More images	Q26549666
The Manor House	II	Phillips Lane			SU1302133017; 51°05′47″N 1°48′56″W		1181774	Upload Photo	Q26477072
Bowling Green House	II	Queen Elizabeth Gardens			SU1399729797; 51°04′02″N 1°48′06″W		1243469	Upload Photo	Q26536143
59-65, Rampart Road	II	59-65, Rampart Road			SU1486129890; 51°04′05″N 1°47′21″W		1273321	Upload Photo	Q26563075
The Wilderness	II	Shady Bower			SU1512229901; 51°04′06″N 1°47′08″W		1243147	Upload Photo	Q26535848
Buildings Fronting South Western Road and Attached Canopy	II	South Western Road			SU1368730133; 51°04′13″N 1°48′22″W		1392847	Upload Photo	Q26672052
Church of St Mark	II	St Mark's Avenue	church building		SU1506530691; 51°04′31″N 1°47′11″W		1259035	Church of St Mark More images	Q26550198
1-7, St Martin's Church Street	II	1-7, St Martin's Church Street			SU1492829696; 51°03′59″N 1°47′18″W		1259045	Upload Photo	Q26550207
14, St Martin's Church Street	II	14, St Martin's Church Street			SU1495429637; 51°03′57″N 1°47′17″W		1273165	Upload Photo	Q26562940
16, St Martin's Church Street	II	16, St Martin's Church Street			SU1496129632; 51°03′57″N 1°47′16″W		1259036	Upload Photo	Q26550199
18-24, St Martin's Church Street	II	18-24, St Martin's Church Street			SU1496429629; 51°03′57″N 1°47′16″W		1259040	Upload Photo	Q26550203
23-35, St Martin's Church Street	II	23-35, St Martin's Church Street			SU1496329660; 51°03′58″N 1°47′16″W		1259046	Upload Photo	Q26550208
Church of St Martin	I	St Martin's Church Street	church building		SU1502629597; 51°03′56″N 1°47′13″W		1259041	Church of St Martin More images	Q36873663
The Tollgate Inn Tollgate Inn	II	St Martin's Church Street			SU1492129709; 51°03′59″N 1°47′18″W		1243201	Upload Photo	Q26535891
2, St Nicholas's Road	II*	2, St Nicholas's Road			SU1437829228; 51°03′44″N 1°47′46″W		1259072	Upload Photo	Q17544162
St Nicholas's Hospital	II*	5, St Nicholas's Road	hospital building		SU1439629143; 51°03′41″N 1°47′45″W		1259077	St Nicholas's Hospital More images	Q17544171
De Vaux House	II*	6, St Nicholas's Road			SU1436029213; 51°03′43″N 1°47′47″W		1259073	Upload Photo	Q17544165
7, St Nicholas's Road	II	7, St Nicholas's Road			SU1437329083; 51°03′39″N 1°47′47″W		1273135	Upload Photo	Q26562917
8, St Nicholas's Road	II*	8, St Nicholas's Road			SU1435029186; 51°03′43″N 1°47′48″W		1273156	Upload Photo	Q17545834
9 and 11, St Nicholas's Road	II	9 and 11, St Nicholas's Road	tollhouse		SU1437029075; 51°03′39″N 1°47′47″W		1259088	9 and 11, St Nicholas's Road More images	Q26550241
10 and 12, St Nicholas's Road	II	10 and 12, St Nicholas's Road			SU1435629125; 51°03′41″N 1°47′47″W		1259074	Upload Photo	Q26550233
16 and 18, St Nicholas's Road	II*	16 and 18, St Nicholas's Road			SU1435329079; 51°03′39″N 1°47′48″W		1259075	Upload Photo	Q17544166
Ayleswade Bridge Old Harnham Bridge	I	St Nicholas's Road	road bridge		SU1436229099; 51°03′40″N 1°47′47″W		1273133	Ayleswade Bridge Old Harnham Bridge More images	Q17529850
Boundary Wall to East of Parsonage Farmhouse, Along Garden by Road	II	Stratford Road			SU1328832256; 51°05′22″N 1°48′42″W		1243248	Upload Photo	Q26535933
Avon Lodge	II	Stratford Road			SU1403631422; 51°04′55″N 1°48′04″W		1272997	Upload Photo	Q26562788
Avon Side	II	Stratford Road			SU1294332164; 51°05′19″N 1°49′00″W		1272990	Upload Photo	Q26562782
Barn of Parsonage Farmhouse Immediately to North West	II	Stratford Road			SU1322832283; 51°05′23″N 1°48′45″W		1243249	Upload Photo	Q26535934
Church Close	II	Stratford Road			SU1290632706; 51°05′37″N 1°49′02″W		1272954	Upload Photo	Q26562750
Church of St Lawrence	I	Stratford Road	church building		SU1303032620; 51°05′34″N 1°48′55″W		1272953	Church of St Lawrence More images	Q7593956
Cottage Approximately 173 Yards to North of Old Laundry on Same Side of Road	II	Stratford Road			SU1345931971; 51°05′13″N 1°48′33″W		1243207	Upload Photo	Q26535896
Dairy Cottage	II	Stratford Road			SU1333432208; 51°05′21″N 1°48′40″W		1243245	Upload Photo	Q26535931
Dean's Farmhouse	II	Stratford Road			SU1299032912; 51°05′43″N 1°48′57″W		1272955	Upload Photo	Q26562751
Flint Cottage Home Cottage	II	Stratford Road			SU1341832005; 51°05′14″N 1°48′35″W		1243208	Upload Photo	Q26535897
Forecourt Side Walls of Parsonage Farmhouse	II	Stratford Road			SU1326232278; 51°05′23″N 1°48′43″W		1272986	Upload Photo	Q26562778
Forecourt Wall to Marwarden Court and St Lawrence Reading Room	II	Stratford Road			SU1303532515; 51°05′30″N 1°48′55″W		1243258	Upload Photo	Q26535942
Former Stable Block of Marwarden Court to South	II	Stratford Road			SU1302332488; 51°05′30″N 1°48′56″W		1243257	Upload Photo	Q26535941
Granary to North of Dean's Farmhouse	II	Stratford Road			SU1301332960; 51°05′45″N 1°48′56″W		1243262	Upload Photo	Q26535946
Little Thatches Old Forge Cottage	II	Stratford Road			SU1331732201; 51°05′20″N 1°48′40″W		1243230	Upload Photo	Q26535917
Marwarden Court	II*	Stratford Road	building		SU1301532506; 51°05′30″N 1°48′56″W		1243256	Marwarden Court More images	Q17543829
Moreton Cottage Including Screen Wall and Outhouse	II	Stratford Road			SU1364431908; 51°05′11″N 1°48′24″W		1272998	Upload Photo	Q26562789
Orchard House	II	Stratford Road			SU1337032018; 51°05′14″N 1°48′38″W		1243213	Upload Photo	Q26535902
Parsonage Farmhouse	II*	Stratford Road			SU1325232260; 51°05′22″N 1°48′44″W		1243246	Upload Photo	Q17543825
Pittsmead	II	Stratford Road			SU1309532444; 51°05′28″N 1°48′52″W		1243254	Upload Photo	Q26535939
Post Office and Shop	II	Stratford Road			SU1319932350; 51°05′25″N 1°48′46″W		1243251	Upload Photo	Q26535936
Prebendal House	II	Stratford Road			SU1305532484; 51°05′29″N 1°48′54″W		1243255	Upload Photo	Q26535940
Railings and Gate in Front of Orchard House	II	Stratford Road			SU1338532039; 51°05′15″N 1°48′37″W		1243226	Upload Photo	Q26535913
Stratford-sub-castle War Memorial	II	Stratford Road, Stratford-sub-castle, SP1 3YP	war memorial		SU1300732619; 51°05′34″N 1°48′56″W		1441029	Stratford-sub-castle War Memorial More images	Q66478273
The Cottage	II	Stratford Road			SU1318232379; 51°05′26″N 1°48′47″W		1243252	Upload Photo	Q26535937
The Old Laundry	II	Stratford Road			SU1350331810; 51°05′08″N 1°48′31″W		1243206	Upload Photo	Q26535895
14-17, the Greencroft	II	14-17, The Greencroft			SU1480230131; 51°04′13″N 1°47′24″W		1355800	Upload Photo	Q26638539
18-24, the Greencroft	II	18-24, The Greencroft			SU1479630158; 51°04′14″N 1°47′25″W		1242204	Upload Photo	Q26535016
Mill House and Old Mill	I	Town Path, West Harnham	mill building		SU1353429413; 51°03′50″N 1°48′30″W		1272956	Mill House and Old Mill More images	Q17529841
Rose Cottage	II	Town Path, West Harnham			SU1353429469; 51°03′52″N 1°48′30″W		1272957	Upload Photo	Q26562752
Lantern Cottage	II	35, Upper Street, West Harnham			SU1290929264; 51°03′45″N 1°49′02″W		1243309	Upload Photo	Q26535992
Statue of Sidney Herbert	II	Victoria Park	statue		SU1426531241; 51°04′49″N 1°47′52″W		1243322	Statue of Sidney Herbert More images	Q26536005
Old Mill Cottage	II	Middle Street3, West Harnham			SU1346329359; 51°03′48″N 1°48′33″W		1242833	Upload Photo	Q26535564
Fountain in Forecourt of the Old Manor, at Old Manor Hospital	II	At Old Manor Hospital, Wilton Road			SU1344730400; 51°04′22″N 1°48′34″W		1243342	Upload Photo	Q26536025
Old School House	II	1, Wilton Road			SU1372530328; 51°04′20″N 1°48′20″W		1243571	Upload Photo	Q26536239
The Paragon	II	1 and 2, Wilton Road			SU1353930432; 51°04′23″N 1°48′29″W		1272930	Upload Photo	Q26683077
The Paragon	II	3 and 4, Wilton Road			SU1348230442; 51°04′23″N 1°48′32″W		1243325	Upload Photo	Q26536008
26 and 28, Wilton Road	II	26 and 28, Wilton Road			SU1355830430; 51°04′23″N 1°48′28″W		1243323	Upload Photo	Q26536006
Salisbury Quaker Meeting House	II	51, Wilton Road, SP2 7EF	villa		SU1357730391; 51°04′22″N 1°48′27″W		1243327	Salisbury Quaker Meeting House More images	Q26536010
Avon House	II	Wilton Road			SU1328130428; 51°04′23″N 1°48′43″W		1243343	Upload Photo	Q26536026
Emmanuel Free Evangelical Church	II	Wilton Road	church building		SU1366730415; 51°04′22″N 1°48′23″W		1272928	Emmanuel Free Evangelical Church More images	Q26562728
The Old Manor at Old Manor Hospital	II	Wilton Road			SU1339830408; 51°04′22″N 1°48′37″W		1272937	The Old Manor at Old Manor Hospital	Q26562736
St Marks Church Infant School	II	Wyndham Road			SU1469230713; 51°04′32″N 1°47′30″W		1272777	Upload Photo	Q26562589

== See also ==
- Grade I listed buildings in Wiltshire
- Grade II* listed buildings in Wiltshire

== Sources ==
- Orbach, Julian; Pevsner, Nikolaus; Cherry, Bridget (2021), Wiltshire, The Buildings of England, New Haven and London: Yale University Press, ISBN 978-0-300-25120-3
