= Salisbury City Council =

Local authority for Salisbury, Wiltshire, England

Type
- Type: Civil parish

Leadership
- Mayor: Cllr Jenny Bolwell

Structure
- Seats: 24
- Liberal Democrats: 11 / 24
- Labour: 4 / 24
- Conservative: 4 / 24
- Independent: 4 / 24
- Reform: 1 / 24

Elections
- Voting system: Plurality-at-large voting
- Last election: 1 May 2025

Meeting place
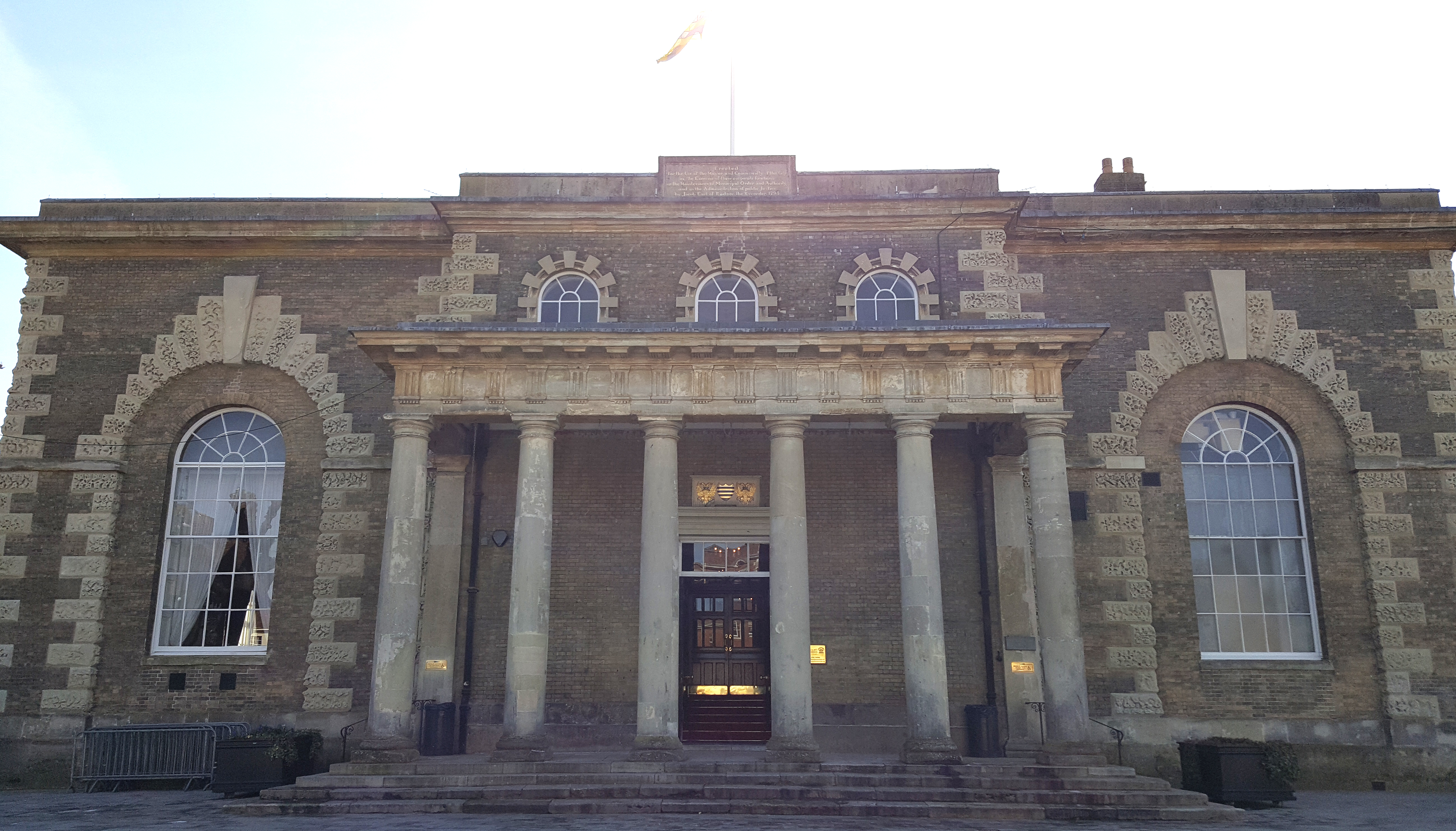
- The Guildhall, Salisbury

Website
- www.salisburycitycouncil.gov.uk

Salisbury City Council is a parish-level council for Salisbury, England. It was established in April 2009 and is based in the city's historic Guildhall. Following the May 2025 election, no party has an overall majority.

== Population ==
The civil parish of Salisbury – which excludes some of the city's suburbs and satellite villages such as Old Sarum, Laverstock, Hampton Park, Britford, Netherhampton and Odstock – had a population of 40,302 at the 2011 census.

== Establishment ==
As New Sarum, Salisbury has been ranked as a city since "time immemorial". The Local Government Act 1972, which took effect in 1974, eliminated the New Sarum City Council, administered under its charters, with the new Salisbury District Council taking over its administrative functions. However, the status of a city was preserved after 1974 by the Charter trustees of the City of New Sarum. That name was formally changed from "New Sarum" to "Salisbury" by the 2009 structural changes to local government in England which created a civil parish of Salisbury and a new Salisbury City Council as its first tier of local government. The parish was again granted city status by letters patent dated 1 April 2009.

The council met in temporary offices until 2011, while the 18th-century Salisbury Guildhall was adapted.

== Coat of arms ==
On 23 March 2010, the city council was granted a royal licence, transferring to it the armorial bearings of the previous City of New Sarum. The arms and supporters were originally recorded at the heraldic visitations of Wiltshire in 1565 and 1623. The blazon of the arms is:

Barry of eight Azure and Or. Supporters: On either side an eagle displayed with two heads Or, ducally gorged Azure.

There do not appear to be any meanings attached to the design. The traditional explanation that the blue stripes represent the rivers that meet in the city is now discounted. It has also been suggested that the eagles derive from the arms of the Bouverie family, Earls of Radnor, benefactors of the city. However, this also can be discounted, as the arms of the city were recorded before the family was connected with it.

== Membership ==
The council has 24 members, elected by eight wards which each elect three councillors. Boundary changes confirmed in 2020 and applied at the 2021 election redrew wards in the central, Harnham, Milford and Bishopdown areas and increased the number of councillors from 23.

Elections to the city council took place on Thursday 1 May 2025. The current makeup of the council is shown below; those marked * are also Wiltshire Councillors.

Ward	Councillor	Party	Term of office
Salisbury (Bemerton Heath)	Caroline Corbin	Labour	2021-
Salisbury (Bemerton Heath)	Richard Johnson	Liberal Democrats	2025-
Salisbury (Bemerton Heath)	Ed Rimmer*	Reform	2021-
Salisbury (Fisherton & Bemerton Village)	Jenny Bolwell	Labour	2021-
Salisbury (Fisherton & Bemerton Village)	Jeremy Nettle	Conservative	2021-
Salisbury (Fisherton & Bemerton Village)	Ricky Rogers*	Independent	2021-
Salisbury (Harnham East)	Mac Brown	Liberal Democrats	2025-
Salisbury (Harnham East)	Sven Hocking*	Conservative	2021-
Salisbury (Harnham East)	Ted Last	Liberal Democrats	2023-
Salisbury (Harnham West)	Brian Dalton*	Liberal Democrat	2021-
Salisbury (Harnham West)	Annie Riddle	Independent	2021-
Salisbury (Harnham West)	Andrew Suddards	Conservative	2025-
Salisbury (Milford)	Phil Beaven	Liberal Democrat	2025-
Salisbury (Milford)	Lawrence Gillies	Liberal Democrat	2026-
Salisbury (Milford)	Patricia Podger	Labour	2025-
Salisbury (St Edmunds)	Samuel Foster	Liberal Democrat	2025-
Salisbury (St Edmunds)	Valentina Milos	Liberal Democrat	2025-
Salisbury (St Edmunds)	Paul Sample*	Liberal Democrat	2021-
Salisbury (St Francis & Stratford)	Atiqul Hoque	Independent	2021-
Salisbury (St Francis & Stratford)	Sharon Rideout	Labour	2024-
Salisbury (St Francis & Stratford)	John Wells*	Independent	2021-
Salisbury (St Paul's)	Sam Charleston	Liberal Democrat	2021-
Salisbury (St Paul's)	Victoria Charleston	Liberal Democrat	2021-
Salisbury (St Paul's)	Chris Taylor*	Conservative	2024-

=== History of control ===
At the first elections to the city council in 2009, the Liberal Democrats won twelve seats, giving them a majority of one over all other parties.

At the next elections, on Thursday, 2 May 2013, no party had overall control. Days after the election, Jo Broom, who had been elected in Fisherton & Bemerton Village as a Liberal Democrat, joined the Conservatives. Then, following the resignation of a Conservative, there was a by-election in the St Martin's & Cathedral ward on 9 January 2014, won by Patricia Fagan for Labour.

In 2017, the Conservatives won an overall majority for the first time.

In 2021, the Conservatives narrowly lost their majority to no overall control, winning 11 out of 24 seats. During the council's term, membership changes reduced their seats to 6 and made Labour and the Liberal Democrats the largest or joint-largest party at various times. The council was governed by a coalition of Labour, the Liberal Democrats and independents.

In 2025, the Liberal Democrats returned to being the largest party on a council under no overall control, winning 10 out of 24 seats. The party subsequently won a by-election in St Edmunds Ward, bringing their total number of councillors to 11.

== Functions ==
The council had some sixty employees in 2018 and is responsible for the following properties and services:

- Parks and associated public conveniences
- Car parks
- Cemeteries and Salisbury Crematorium
- Play areas
- Sports pitches
- Open spaces
- Allotments
- Charter market
- Charter fair
- The Guildhall
- Bemerton Heath neighbourhood centre
- General fund shops and garages owned by the city prior to 1974
- Events: Christmas Lights, St George's Day, Salisbury Food Festival, Music in the Parks, Britain in Bloom
- City Centre management
- General Community Fund
