= Salisbury Guildhall =

Municipal building in Salisbury, Wiltshire, England

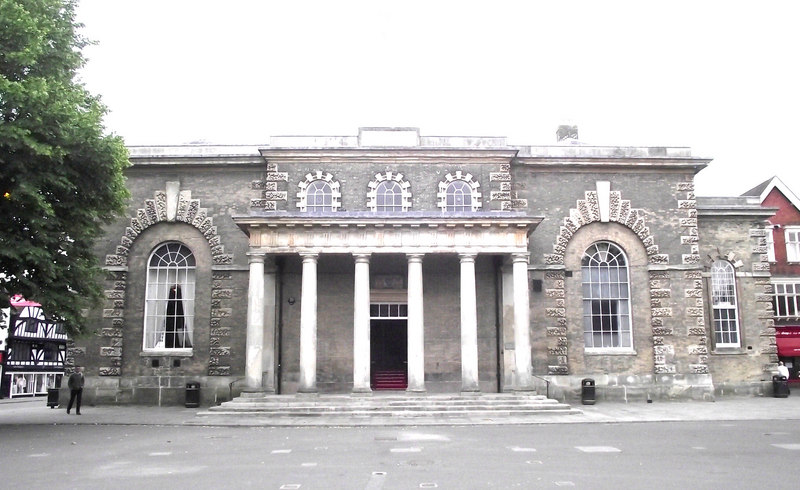

- Location within Wiltshire
- 51.0690°N 1.7945°W
- Location: Salisbury, Wiltshire, England

History
- Built: 1795

Site notes
- Architect(s): Sir Robert Taylor and William Pilkington

Listed Building – Grade II*
- Designated: 28 February 1952
- Reference no.: 1242739

Salisbury Guildhall is an 18th-century municipal building in the Market Place, Salisbury, England. The building, which is the meeting place of the Salisbury City Council, is a Grade II* listed building.

== History ==
The first guildhall, known as the "Bishop's Guildhall", was built on the initiative of the Bishop of Salisbury, Simon of Ghent, in around 1314. It was so-called because this was the place where the bishop would exercise his feudal rights. A second building, known as the "Council House" was built by the Merchants Guild to the north of the original building in 1585. After the Council House was burnt down in a fire at a banquet, it was rebuilt, with a gift from Jacob Pleydell-Bouverie, 2nd Earl of Radnor, in 1780.

In 1785 the bishop gave up his rights as clerk of the market and in return was released from his obligations to maintain the guildhall. This enabled the old Bishop's Guildhall, which had become dilapidated, to be demolished. The current building, which was designed by Sir Robert Taylor and William Pilkington, was built on the site of the former Bishop's Guildhall and completed in 1795. The design involved a portico with Doric order columns with triglyph frieze above; tall arched windows were inserted on each side of the portico. A grand jury room was added in 1829.

In the 19th century, the judicial functions of the county were discharged at Devizes Assize Court in the summer and at Salisbury Guildhall in the lent. There was a bomb explosion outside the guildhall in September 1884; according to the judge, the defendants had been "motivated by a mischievous desire to alarm the public".

The building, which had been the meeting place of the municipal borough of Salisbury throughout much of the 20th century, became the headquarters of Salisbury District in 1974. All magistrates' court hearings in Salisbury were held in the courtroom in the west wing of the guildhall. Additional judicial facilities, to accommodate the crown and county courts, were established in Alexandra House in St John's Street in the mid-1980s. Princess Diana visited the guildhall on 14 May 1991.

After the abolition of the district in 2009, the guildhall became the meeting place of the newly created Salisbury City Council. The Prince of Wales and the Duchess of Cornwall visited, in the aftermath of the Salisbury nerve agent attack, on 22 June 2018.

Works of art in the guildhall include a portrait by John de Critz of James VI and I, a portrait by Peter Lely of John Seymour, 4th Duke of Somerset and a painting by George Cole depicting a view of Salisbury from Harnham Hill. The Victoria Cross awarded to Lieutenant-Colonel Tom Adlam during the First World War is also on display in the guildhall.
