= Listed buildings in Salisbury (The Close) =

Non-Civil Parish in Hampshire, England

Salisbury is a cathedral city and civil parish in Wiltshire, England. It contains 641 listed buildings that are recorded in the National Heritage List for England. Of these 38 are grade I, 139 are grade II* and 464 are grade II.

This list is based on the information retrieved online from Historic England. The quantity of listed buildings in Salisbury requires subdivision into geographically defined lists. This list includes all listed buildings located in the cathedral close.

== Key ==
Grade	Criteria
I	Buildings that are of exceptional interest
II*	Particularly important buildings of more than special interest
II	Buildings that are of special interest

== Listing ==
Name	Grade	Location	Type	Completed (Note: The date given is the date used by Historic England as significant for the initial building or that of an important part in the structure's description.)	Grid ref. (Note: The grid reference is based on the British national grid reference system, sometimes known as OSGB36, used by the Ordnance Survey.) Geo-coordinates	Notes	Entry number (Note: The "List Entry Number" is a unique number assigned to each listed building and scheduled monument by Historic England.)	Image	
K6 Telephone Kiosk	II	Choristers Square			SU1424829703; 51°03′59″N 1°47′53″W		1272821	Upload Photo	Q26562628
Cathedral Church of St Mary	I	The Close	Anglican cathedral		SU1430229533; 51°03′54″N 1°47′50″W		1023581	Cathedral Church of St Mary More images	Q390150
5, the Close	II*	5, The Close			SU1442929568; 51°03′55″N 1°47′44″W		1251965	5, the Close	Q17543997
Bollards on Pavement in Front of Gate of No 5	II	The Close			SU1441529570; 51°03′55″N 1°47′44″W		1023585	Bollards on Pavement in Front of Gate of No 5	Q26274569
Garden Wall of No 5 Running South Parallel with Road	II	The Close			SU1441629554; 51°03′55″N 1°47′44″W		1251993	Upload Photo	Q26543903
Railings and Wall with Gate Across Front of Number 5	II	The Close			SU1441729570; 51°03′55″N 1°47′44″W		1023584	Railings and Wall with Gate Across Front of Number 5	Q26274568
Diocesan Registry	II*	6, The Close	architectural structure		SU1442329579; 51°03′55″N 1°47′44″W		1355832	Diocesan Registry More images	Q17546370
The Deanery	II*	7a and 8a, The Close			SU1442729592; 51°03′56″N 1°47′44″W		1252023	Upload Photo	Q17544001
8, the Close	II*	8, The Close			SU1444229614; 51°03′56″N 1°47′43″W		1023586	8, the Close	Q17534644
9, the Close	II*	9, The Close			SU1444829630; 51°03′57″N 1°47′43″W		1355833	9, the Close	Q17546376
10, the Close	II	10, The Close			SU1446429634; 51°03′57″N 1°47′42″W		1252031	Upload Photo	Q26543935
11, the Close	II*	11, The Close			SU1448029630; 51°03′57″N 1°47′41″W		1023587	11, the Close	Q17534655
Yard Wall Gates and Overthrow to No 11	II	The Close			SU1449229635; 51°03′57″N 1°47′40″W		1023588	Upload Photo	Q26274570
Surface of Stable Yard of No 11	II	The Close			SU1449229625; 51°03′57″N 1°47′40″W		1252042	Upload Photo	Q26543946
12, the Close	II*	12, The Close			SU1451129629; 51°03′57″N 1°47′39″W		1355834	12, the Close	Q17546381
13, the Close	II	13, The Close			SU1452129629; 51°03′57″N 1°47′39″W		1023589	Upload Photo	Q26274571
14 and 14a, the Close	II*	14 and 14a, The Close			SU1454029629; 51°03′57″N 1°47′38″W		1262463	14 and 14a, the Close	Q17544235
Malmesbury House	I	15, The Close	building		SU1454529642; 51°03′57″N 1°47′38″W		1252102	Malmesbury House More images	Q17529760
Wall Along North Walk Enclosing Forecourt of No 15 (Malmesbury House) Including Gatepiers and Doorway	II	The Close			SU1452229644; 51°03′57″N 1°47′39″W		1023591	Upload Photo	Q26274572
Summer House in Garden of No 15	II*	The Close			SU1453929713; 51°04′00″N 1°47′38″W		1023590	Upload Photo	Q17534662
16, the Close	II*	16, The Close			SU1449629658; 51°03′58″N 1°47′40″W		1252131	Upload Photo	Q17544007
Gateway and Overthrow in Garden of No 16	II	The Close			SU1451329656; 51°03′58″N 1°47′39″W		1023592	Upload Photo	Q26274574
Garden Wall of No 16 Along North Walk Including Doorway	II	The Close			SU1450329645; 51°03′57″N 1°47′40″W		1355836	Upload Photo	Q26638560
17, the Close	II*	17, The Close			SU1448929669; 51°03′58″N 1°47′41″W		1252153	Upload Photo	Q17544009
Garden Wall to North Walk of No 17 Including Rails and Gate	II	The Close			SU1448429646; 51°03′57″N 1°47′41″W		1355837	Upload Photo	Q26638561
West Party Wall to Front Garden of No 17	II	The Close			SU1448129655; 51°03′58″N 1°47′41″W		1023593	Upload Photo	Q26274575
18, the Close	II*	18, The Close			SU1447729668; 51°03′58″N 1°47′41″W		1023594	Upload Photo	Q17534673
Garden Wall and Rails to North Walk of No 18	II	The Close			SU1447429647; 51°03′58″N 1°47′41″W		1355838	Upload Photo	Q26638562
Gates, Piers Overthrow and Forecourt Wall to North Walk of No 19 and Its Extension to East in Front of Chapel	II	The Close			SU1442929650; 51°03′58″N 1°47′44″W		1355839	Upload Photo	Q26638563
Theological College	I	19, The Close	college		SU1443529670; 51°03′58″N 1°47′43″W		1023595	Theological College More images	Q7424719
20, the Close	II*	20, The Close	building		SU1439129664; 51°03′58″N 1°47′46″W		1023596	20, the Close More images	Q17534682
Railings and Gates Along North Walk to Front of Garden of Number 20	II	The Close			SU1438929652; 51°03′58″N 1°47′46″W		1355840	Upload Photo	Q26638564
21 and 21a, the Close	II*	21 and 21a, The Close	building		SU1435229676; 51°03′58″N 1°47′48″W		1023597	21 and 21a, the Close More images	Q17534694
Gate Piers and Overthrow of Nos 21 and 21a	II	The Close			SU1434829656; 51°03′58″N 1°47′48″W		1023600	Upload Photo	Q26274578
Garden Wall Along Lane on West Side, of Nos 21 and 21a	II	Of Nos 21 and 21a, The Close			SU1433629687; 51°03′59″N 1°47′48″W		1253070	Upload Photo	Q26544875
Former Stable Block of No 21 and 21a	II	The Close			SU1437029682; 51°03′59″N 1°47′47″W		1023598	Upload Photo	Q26274576
Commemorative Arch Set in Wall on East Side of Front Garden of Nos 21 and 21a	II	The Close			SU1436729658; 51°03′58″N 1°47′47″W		1023599	Upload Photo	Q26274577
22, the Close	II	22, The Close			SU1435129711; 51°04′00″N 1°47′48″W		1023601	Upload Photo	Q26274579
23, the Close	II*	23, The Close			SU1434229734; 51°04′00″N 1°47′48″W		1253075	23, the Close	Q17544079
24, the Close	II*	24, The Close			SU1432929719; 51°04′00″N 1°47′49″W		1023602	24, the Close	Q17534701
25, the Close	II*	25, The Close			SU1432329680; 51°03′59″N 1°47′49″W		1023603	25, the Close	Q17534712
Railings Along Pavement and Flanking Door of No 27	II	The Close			SU1430929656; 51°03′58″N 1°47′50″W		1023605	Railings Along Pavement and Flanking Door of No 27	Q26274581
Forecourt Railings of No 25	II	The Close			SU1432929680; 51°03′59″N 1°47′49″W		1253077	Forecourt Railings of No 25	Q26544881
26, the Close	II*	26, The Close			SU1432229662; 51°03′58″N 1°47′49″W		1355841	26, the Close	Q17546387
Basement and Step Railings of No 26	II	The Close			SU1432129656; 51°03′58″N 1°47′49″W		1023604	Basement and Step Railings of No 26	Q26274580
27, the Close	II*	27, The Close			SU1431029663; 51°03′58″N 1°47′50″W		1261925	27, the Close	Q17544202
28, the Close	II	28, The Close			SU1430229664; 51°03′58″N 1°47′50″W		1355842	Upload Photo	Q26638565
29, the Close	II*	29, The Close			SU1429529664; 51°03′58″N 1°47′51″W		1253156	29, the Close	Q17544086
30, the Close	II*	30, The Close			SU1428129663; 51°03′58″N 1°47′51″W		1023606	30, the Close	Q17534722
31, the Close	II*	31, The Close			SU1426929666; 51°03′58″N 1°47′52″W		1355843	31, the Close	Q17546391
Rails Along Pavement of No 31	II	The Close			SU1427029660; 51°03′58″N 1°47′52″W		1261929	Rails Along Pavement of No 31	Q26552839
33, the Close	II*	32, The Close			SU1426929639; 51°03′57″N 1°47′52″W		1023607	33, the Close More images	Q17534731
Garden Wall Adjoining to East, of Nos 32 and 33	II	The Close			SU1428629647; 51°03′58″N 1°47′51″W		1253213	Upload Photo	Q26544989
34, the Close	II*	34, The Close			SU1422729655; 51°03′58″N 1°47′54″W		1355844	34, the Close More images	Q17546396
35 and 35a, the Close	II*	35 and 35a, The Close			SU1421129656; 51°03′58″N 1°47′55″W		1023608	35 and 35a, the Close More images	Q17534740
36a and 36b, the Close	II*	36a and 36b, The Close	building		SU1425929669; 51°03′58″N 1°47′52″W		1253217	36a and 36b, the Close More images	Q17544089
Rails in Front of Nos 36a and 36b Including Footscrapers	II	The Close			SU1425229666; 51°03′58″N 1°47′53″W		1023609	Upload Photo	Q26274582
37, the Close	II*	37, The Close			SU1426329678; 51°03′59″N 1°47′52″W		1355845	37, the Close	Q17546401
Forecourt Rails and Gate of No 37	II	The Close			SU1425629679; 51°03′59″N 1°47′53″W		1261884	Forecourt Rails and Gate of No 37	Q26552803
38 the Close	II*	38, The Close			SU1426629690; 51°03′59″N 1°47′52″W		1023610	38 the Close	Q17534747
Forecourt Walls, Gate Piers and Gates of Nos 39 to 46	I	The Close	wall		SU1426829724; 51°04′00″N 1°47′52″W		1253963	Forecourt Walls, Gate Piers and Gates of Nos 39 to 46 More images	Q17529771
The Matron's College	I	39-46, The Close	college		SU1428029706; 51°03′59″N 1°47′51″W		1355846	The Matron's College More images	Q15211232
47, the Close	II	47, The Close			SU1429829734; 51°04′00″N 1°47′50″W		1023611	Upload Photo	Q26274584
48 and 48a, the Close	II*	48 and 48a, The Close	building		SU1428629752; 51°04′01″N 1°47′51″W		1253969	48 and 48a, the Close More images	Q17544101
50 and 50a, the Close	II*	50 and 50a, The Close			SU1426529754; 51°04′01″N 1°47′52″W		1355807	50 and 50a, the Close	Q17546349
51 and 52, the Close	II*	51 and 52, The Close			SU1426029731; 51°04′00″N 1°47′52″W		1261505	51 and 52, the Close More images	Q17544200
Mompesson House	I	53, The Close	building		SU1422829731; 51°04′00″N 1°47′54″W		1355808	Mompesson House More images	Q6897487
Screen Wall, Rails, Piers, Gates and Overthrow in Front of Mompesson House	I	The Close			SU1422329721; 51°04′00″N 1°47′54″W		1253989	Upload Photo	Q96263022
53a, the Close	II*	53a, The Close			SU1425029722; 51°04′00″N 1°47′53″W		1023613	53a, the Close More images	Q17534756
Hungerford Chantry	II*	54, The Close	house		SU1420729738; 51°04′00″N 1°47′55″W		1023614	Hungerford Chantry More images	Q17534767
East Boundary Wall to Back Garden of No 54	II	The Close			SU1421829758; 51°04′01″N 1°47′54″W		1355809	Upload Photo	Q26638545
Garden Wall and Gate in Front of No 54	II	The Close			SU1420429727; 51°04′00″N 1°47′55″W		1023615	Upload Photo	Q26274585
55, the Close	II*	55, The Close	building		SU1419629742; 51°04′01″N 1°47′56″W		1023616	55, the Close More images	Q17534778
Forecourt Wall, Rails, Piers and Gate of No 55	II	The Close			SU1419229732; 51°04′00″N 1°47′56″W		1355810	Upload Photo	Q26638546
55a, the Close	II*	55a, The Close			SU1419829767; 51°04′01″N 1°47′56″W		1023617	Upload Photo	Q17534790
Former Stable Block, Now Garage of No 56a and 56b	II*	The Close			SU1419029758; 51°04′01″N 1°47′56″W		1023619	Upload Photo	Q17534800
Wall and Gates with Rails in Front of 56a and 56b	II	The Close			SU1418529729; 51°04′00″N 1°47′56″W		1023618	Upload Photo	Q26274586
Hemingsby House	I	56a and 56b, The Close	building		SU1416629737; 51°04′00″N 1°47′57″W		1355811	Hemingsby House More images	Q17530006
Wren Hall	I	56c, The Close	house		SU1415929711; 51°04′00″N 1°47′58″W		1023620	Wren Hall More images	Q15979619
Boundary Wall to Pavement and Gates of No 56c	II	The Close			SU1417829705; 51°03′59″N 1°47′57″W		1023621	Upload Photo	Q26274587
Boundary Wall and Gate to Nos 57, 57a and 57b	II	57a and 57b, The Close			SU1417329689; 51°03′59″N 1°47′57″W		1023623	Upload Photo	Q26274588
Garden Wall and Gate Piers of No 58	II	The Close			SU1416929665; 51°03′58″N 1°47′57″W		1023624	Upload Photo	Q26274589
Arundells	II*	59, The Close	house		SU1411629644; 51°03′57″N 1°48′00″W		1254399	Arundells More images	Q15978881
Stable Block of No 59 (Arundalls)	II	The Close			SU1415229645; 51°03′57″N 1°47′58″W		1355812	Upload Photo	Q26638547
Screen Wall, Rails, Gate Piers, Gates and Overthrow of No 59 (Arundalls)	II	The Close			SU1416529640; 51°03′57″N 1°47′57″W		1023625	Screen Wall, Rails, Gate Piers, Gates and Overthrow of No 59 (Arundalls) More images	Q26274590
The North Canonry and the Gatehouse	II*	60, The Close, SP1 2EN	architectural structure		SU1415329600; 51°03′56″N 1°47′58″W		1261322	The North Canonry and the Gatehouse More images	Q17544196
Gate in Centre of Wall Dividing Garden at Beginning of Walk Down to River, of No 60	II	The Close			SU1408529610; 51°03′56″N 1°48′01″W		1355813	Upload Photo	Q26638548
Garden House of No 60 (North Canonry)	II	The Close			SU1398429657; 51°03′58″N 1°48′07″W		1023626	Upload Photo	Q26274591
Gate Piers and Gates and Over Throw of Former No 62 (college of Sarum St Michael)	II	The Close			SU1415029543; 51°03′54″N 1°47′58″W		1023627	Upload Photo	Q26274592
College of Sarum St Michael	II	63 and 64, The Close			SU1413929509; 51°03′53″N 1°47′59″W		1254423	College of Sarum St Michael More images	Q26546094
The King's House and College of Sarum St Michael	I	65, The Close	house		SU1410529487; 51°03′52″N 1°48′00″W		1355814	The King's House and College of Sarum St Michael More images	Q17530011
68, the Close	I	68, The Close, SP1 2EN	building		SU1411529412; 51°03′50″N 1°48′00″W		1261304	68, the Close More images	Q17529793
Retaining Wall, Screen Railings, Piers and Gates to Front Garden of 68, the Close	I	68, The Close, SP1 2EN	retaining wall		SU1414229407; 51°03′50″N 1°47′58″W		1023629	Retaining Wall, Screen Railings, Piers and Gates to Front Garden of 68, the Close More images	Q17529292
Two Urns in Front Garden of 68, the Close	II	68, The Close, SP1 2EN			SU1413129413; 51°03′50″N 1°47′59″W		1355815	Upload Photo	Q26638549
68a, the Close	II*	68a, The Close			SU1412629429; 51°03′50″N 1°47′59″W		1023628	Upload Photo	Q17534811
Forecourt Wall, Piers, Gates and Overthrow of 69 the Close	II	69, The Close, SP1 2EN			SU1414229383; 51°03′49″N 1°47′58″W		1023630	Upload Photo	Q26274594
The Walton Canonry	I	69, The Close, SP1 2EN	architectural structure		SU1411829379; 51°03′49″N 1°48′00″W		1261267	The Walton Canonry More images	Q17529787
Boundary Wall of 70 the Close Running to South Along Road	II	70, The Close, SP1 2EN			SU1415329299; 51°03′46″N 1°47′58″W		1355817	Upload Photo	Q26638550
Dwarf Wall, Rails, Piers, Gates and Overthrow to Road Across Front of 70 the Close	II	70, The Close, SP1 2EN			SU1414929329; 51°03′47″N 1°47′58″W		1240488	Upload Photo	Q26533411
Garden Walls of 70 the Close on South Side of House Including Fragments of Original Structure.	II	70, The Close, SP1 2EN			SU1404329272; 51°03′45″N 1°48′04″W		1254461	Upload Photo	Q26546130
Gate Lodges to Road and Archway and Screen Wall Along North Side of Front Garden of 70, the Close	II	70, The Close, SP1 2EN			SU1413329337; 51°03′48″N 1°47′59″W		1023631	Upload Photo	Q26274595
Leaden Hall	I	70, The Close, SP1 2EN	house		SU1411229321; 51°03′47″N 1°48′00″W		1355816	Leaden Hall More images	Q17530015
Entrance of 71 the Close from West Walk Into Screen Walls Gate Piers and Overthrow	II	71, The Close, SP1 2ER			SU1417929224; 51°03′44″N 1°47′57″W		1260983	Upload Photo	Q26551964
The South Canonry, Now Bishop's House	II	71, The Close, SP1 2ER			SU1414729170; 51°03′42″N 1°47′58″W		1023632	Upload Photo	Q26274596
Boundary Wall and Gateway to North of 71a and 71b the Close, Along West Walk	II	71a and 71b, The Close, SP1 2EN			SU1416029259; 51°03′45″N 1°47′58″W		1355818	Upload Photo	Q26638551
71a and 71b, the Close	II	71a and 71b, The Close, SP1 2EN			SU1416429234; 51°03′44″N 1°47′57″W		1023633	Upload Photo	Q26274597
72, the Close	II	72, The Close			SU1426229233; 51°03′44″N 1°47′52″W		1240553	Upload Photo	Q26533473
73, the Close	II*	73, The Close			SU1427029236; 51°03′44″N 1°47′52″W		1023634	Upload Photo	Q17534821
South Or Harnham Gate and South Gate House	I	74, The Close	architectural structure		SU1427129247; 51°03′45″N 1°47′52″W		1240556	South Or Harnham Gate and South Gate House More images	Q17529699
Bishop's Gate	I	The Close	architectural structure		SU1451729429; 51°03′50″N 1°47′39″W		1355830	Bishop's Gate More images	Q17530023
Braybrooke House	I	The Close	house		SU1413529697; 51°03′59″N 1°47′59″W		1023622	Braybrooke House More images	Q17529288
Cathedral School	I	The Close			SU1438529398; 51°03′49″N 1°47′46″W		1251561	Upload Photo	Q123153445
Churchyard Walls Surrounding Cathedral Lawn	II	The Close			SU1437629498; 51°03′53″N 1°47′46″W		1023582	Upload Photo	Q26274566
College of Sarum St Michael the Old Deanery	II*	The Close			SU1409829557; 51°03′55″N 1°48′01″W		1254416	Upload Photo	Q17544105
St Annes Gate	I	The Close	gate		SU1455029638; 51°03′57″N 1°47′37″W		1355835	St Annes Gate More images	Q17530027
The Close Wall	I	The Close			SU1453929534; 51°03′54″N 1°47′38″W		1251543	Upload Photo	Q17529748
The Wardrobe	II*	The Close	museum building		SU1413429668; 51°03′58″N 1°47′59″W		1254383	The Wardrobe More images	Q17544103
Wall Running North of Lodge, Parallel with Road	II	The Close			SU1441529508; 51°03′53″N 1°47′44″W		1355831	Upload Photo	Q26638559
Lodge and Gatepiers at North Entrance to Cathedral School	II	The Close			SU1441829493; 51°03′53″N 1°47′44″W		1023583	Upload Photo	Q26274567
North Gate	I	The Close	city gate		SU1427329754; 51°04′01″N 1°47′52″W		1023612	North Gate More images	Q17529286

== See also ==
- Grade I listed buildings in Wiltshire
- Grade II* listed buildings in Wiltshire

== Sources ==
- Orbach, Julian; Pevsner, Nikolaus; Cherry, Bridget (2021), Wiltshire, The Buildings of England, New Haven and London: Yale University Press, ISBN 978-0-300-25120-3
