= Altar poem =

An altar poem is a pattern poem in which the lines are arranged to look like the form of an altar. The text and shape relate to each other, the latter usually giving added meaning to the poem itself. The tradition of shaped poetry goes back to Greek poets writing in Alexandria before the Common Era but most examples date from later and were written by European Christian poets during the Baroque period.

== Classical examples ==
Three poems in the shape of altars date from Classical times, starting from the turn of the Common Era, and refer to Pagan altars, even though the last of the poets was a Christian.

The name of the creator of the earliest poem is known to be Dosiadas, but there is no other information about him. As in some of the shaped poems written before it, the 18 lines propose a riddle to which the shape gives a clue. Containing recondite allusions to Greek mythology which have to be penetrated first, they begin "I am the work of the husband of the man-mantled queen, the twice young mortal," by which one understands Jason, husband of Medea, who had once had to flee for her life in male disguise and who rejuvenated her husband by boiling him in a cauldron. The puzzle continues on for another sixteen longer and shorter lines arranged to represent an altar balanced on a pillared base.

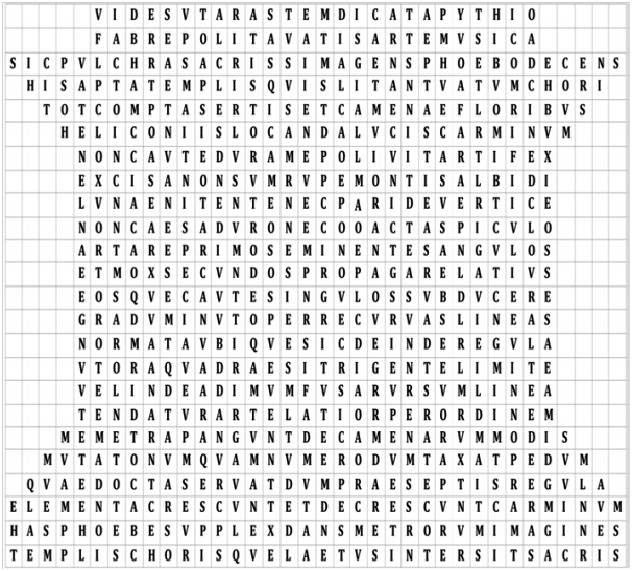
The altar poem (Carmen XXVI) by Optatianus

The second poem is also in Greek and was the work of Lucius Julius Vestinus, who describes himself as "High-priest of Alexandria and all Egypt, Curator of the Museum, Keeper of the Libraries of both Greek and Roman at Rome, Supervisor of the Education of Hadrian, and Secretary to the same Emperor." The 26 lines of the poem represent the altar's self-referential soliloquy, but the initial letters of the lines are also an acrostic that spell out a complimentary message to the Emperor.

Finally there is a poem written in Latin by Publilius Optatianus Porfyrius dating from the first quarter of the 4th century. In this the altar describes its construction as "polished by the craft of the poet's musical art (fabre polita vatis arte musica)…I am straightly confined and hold back my edges as they attempt to grow and then, in the succeeding portion, let them spread more broadly." It then elaborates in an equally self-descriptive way. The poem has been judged to be 'undoubtedly a direct imitation of "Jason's Altar"' by Dosidas.

== The English Baroque ==
Poems in the form of an altar reappear in the Baroque period, written by educated authors who had come across the shaped poems preserved in the Greek anthology. At the very beginning of this period, an altar was found to be a convenient shape for an epitaph, as in the anonymous tribute in Greek to the poet Philip Sydney in the Peplus Illustrissimi viri D. Philippi Sidnaei (1587), and there are later examples of such epitaphs in English by William Browne and Robert Baron.

There was an even earlier altar poem in Latin dating from 1573 by the English Catholic Richard Willis. Turning away from pagan associations, his poem declares itself "an altar of the Christian religion". In its presence, Willis represents himself as "Reborn in the holy/ washing of baptism"; though tried by perilous exile, he will keep the faith to the end. The dedicatory poems to King James the First, prefacing Joshua Sylvester's 1604 translation of a Christian epic by Du Bartas, occupy a position midway between Pagan and Christian. They are arranged as altar shapes centred upon each of the Classical Muses, but chiefly their names are only used as markers of the various aspects of the poem recommended to the king.

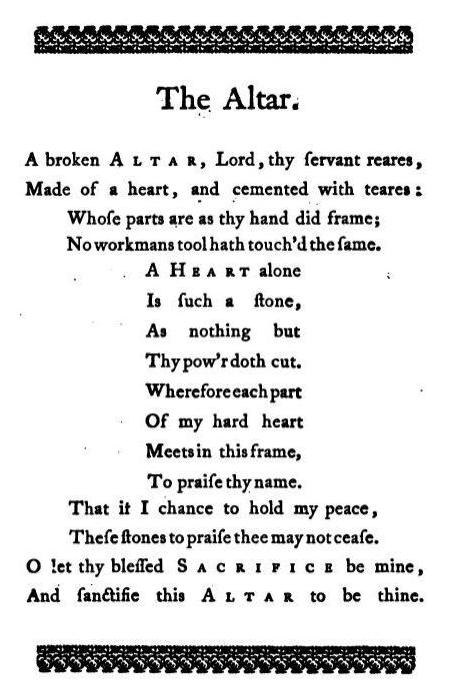
The 17th century text of George Herbert's "The Altar"

Most modern commentaries reflect on how altar poems of the period relate to the best known example, George Herbert's "The Altar" (1633). An earlier anonymous example in Francis Davison's Poetical Rhapsody (1602), the address of a rejected lover, approximates the form of George Herbert. A cross-rhymed octosyllabic quatrain is supported by three 4-syllabled quatrains which have as base another octosyllabic quatrain. Herbert's is quantitively different, however. It is rhymed throughout in couplets and has lines of differing length (a pentameter followed by tetrameter) at the head which are reversed at the base). His poem is also more serious in tone, for all that it is built on an extravagantly Baroque conceit. His altar, he declares, is constructed from a broken, stony heart that is offered as a sacrifice to God.

A nearly contemporary poem by William Bosworth (written about 1628, although not printed until 1651) matches the form of Herbert's altar exactly. It appears untitled near the end of the "Haemon and Antigone" episode in his The Chaste and Lost Lovers, beginning with the lines "Those that Idalia's wanton garments wear/ No Sacrifices for me must prepare". There too is a repetition of the word 'altar' in connection with the word 'sacrifice' which, more logically than in Herbert, appears on top of the altar. Edward Benlowes' poem "The Consecration", in his Theophila, or Loves sacrifice: A divine poem (1652), was dissimilar in form from Herbert, but was surrounded by a drawn outline to make the likeness to an altar clearer, as happened in some later editions of Herbert's poem. In the last quarter of the century appeared Samuel Speed's verbally "servile imitation" of Herbert, also titled "The Altar", in his Prison Pietie (1677).

The taste for this kind of production was now over in any case. John Dryden satirised the Baroque taste in his “Mac Flecknoe” and Joseph Addison singled out Herbert's "The Altar" and its companion piece, "Easter Wings", as a false and obsolete kind of wit. In Germany, too, where there had been a similar craze, Johann Leonhard Frisch composed some extreme examples, including an altar bearing a flaming heart, as satires upon the style. Few more shaped poems were to be written until centuries later, and then in the service of a completely different aesthetic.

== See also ==
- Carmen figuratum
- Concrete poetry
