= Carmen figuratum =

Poetic form

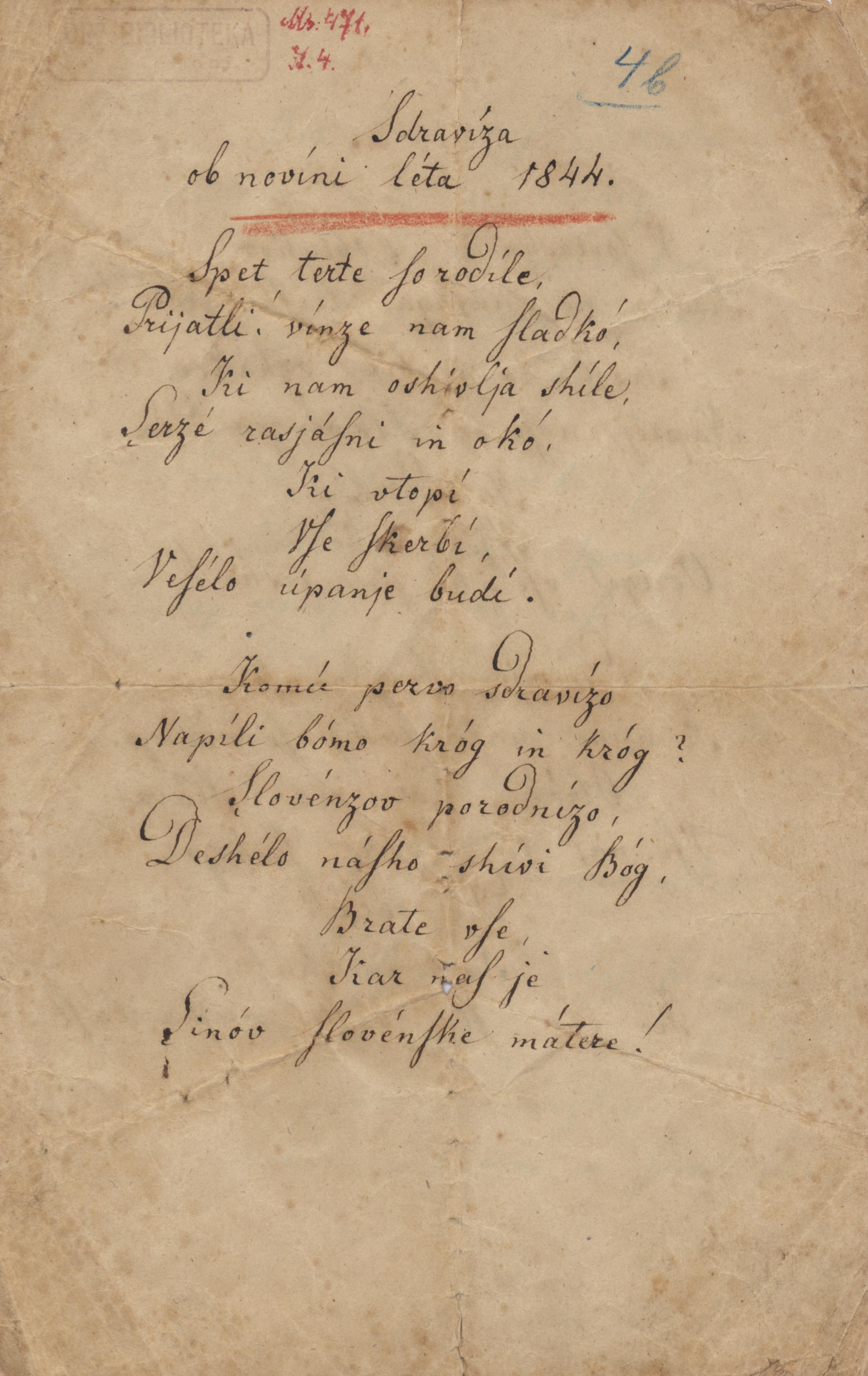
"Zdravljica", the poem by the Slovene poet France Prešeren, is a carmen figuratum in which each stanza has the shape of a wine cup.

Carmen figuratum (plural: carmina figurata "shaped poems") is a poem that has a certain shape or pattern formed either by some or all the words it contains. As a form of visual poetry, carmina figurata are similar to the calligram, notably the Calligrammes by Guillaume Apollinaire. Like calligraphy and typography, carmina figurata occupy a liminal space between graphic design and visual art. An example is France Prešeren's "Zdravljica", where the shape of each stanza resembles a wine goblet.

== Origin of the term ==
The term derives from the carmina figurata of Renaissance texts – works in which a sacred image was picked out in red letters against a field of black type so that a holy figure could be seen and meditated on during the process of reading. Carmina figurata spread in the Carolingian period to spread the use and study of Latin.

== Examples ==
=== Latin poetry ===
- Rabanus Maurus' De laudibus sanctae crucis ("On the Praises of the Holy Cross") or In honorem sanctae crucis ("In the Honor of the Holy Cross), a medieval collection of metrical Latin poetry from the Carolingian period that use a crossword puzzle-like grid in manuscripts to visually represent Cruciform imagery in a variety of colorful compositions that range in complexity from poems shaped into basic visual patterns, such as numbers and single words with Christian symbolism, to full-figure representations, including a Crucifix, a portrait of Louis the Pious, and Rabanus' own self-portrait.

Selected carmina figurata by Rabanus Maurus
Portrait of patron	Self-portrait of artist	Carolingian Cross
Contemporary depiction of Louis the Pious from 826 as a miles Christi (soldier of Christ), with a poem of Rabanus Maurus overlaid. Part of De laudibus Sanctae Crucis, a larger collection of cruciform carmina figurata (pattern poetry) by Rabanus Maurus, 9th-century manuscript at the Vatican Library: Vat. Reg.lat.124, f. 4v. https://digi.vatlib.it/view/MSS_Reg.lat.124/0012	Self-portrait of Abbot Rabanus Maurus of Fulda, 11th century manuscript of his Liber de laudibus Sanctae Crucis, Bern, Burgerbibliothek Cod. 9, f. 24v. https://www.e-codices.unifr.ch/en/list/one/bbb/0009	Carmen figuratum depicting a Carolingian cross in an 11th century manuscript of Rabanus Maurus' Liber de laudibus Sanctae Crucis, Bern, Burgerbibliothek, Codex 9, folio 2 verso

=== Poetry in other languages ===
- France Prešeren's "Zdravljica", written in Slovenian.

== See also ==
- Altar poem – A poem in which the lines are arranged to look like the form of an altar
- Calligram – Written work arranged in a way that creates a visual image
- Concrete poetry – Genre of poetry with lines arranged as a shape
- Haptic poetry – A liminal art form combining characteristics of typography and sculpture to create objects not only to be seen, but to be touched and manipulated
- Visual poetry – Poetry style that incorporates graphic and visual design elements
