= The Mouse's Tale =

1865 shaped poem by Lewis Carroll

"The Mouse's Tale" is a shaped poem by Lewis Carroll which appears in his 1865 novel Alice's Adventures in Wonderland. Though no formal title for the poem is given in the text, the chapter title refers to "A Long Tale" and the Mouse introduces it by saying, "Mine is a long and sad tale!" As well as the contribution of typography to illustrate the intended pun in this title, artists later made the intention clear as well. Translators of the story also encountered difficulty in conveying the meaning there, part of which was not recognised until well over a century later.

== Content ==
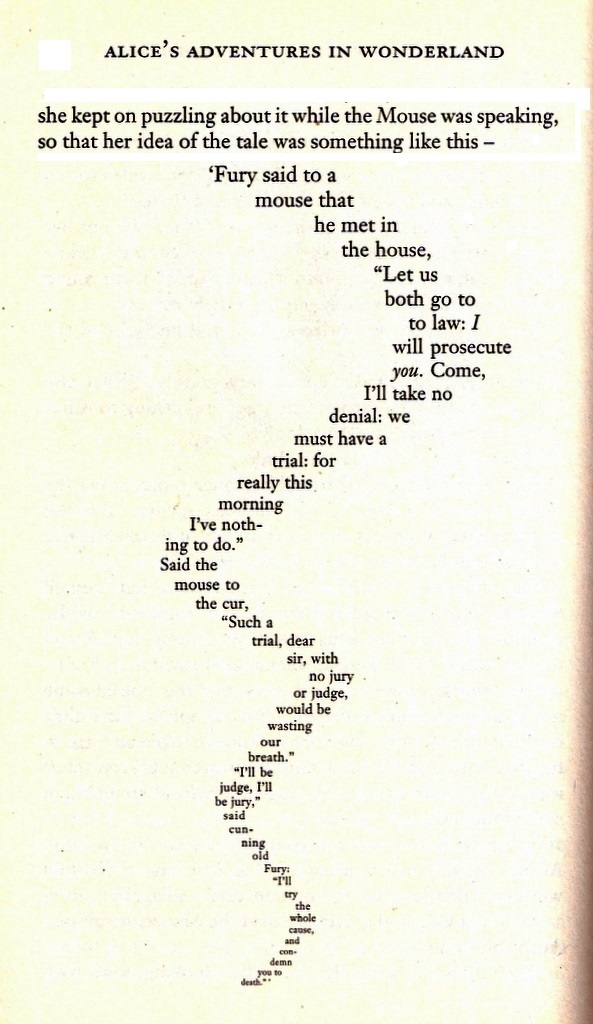
The printed version of "The Mouse's Tale", p.36 in the 1865 edition of Alice's Adventures in Wonderland

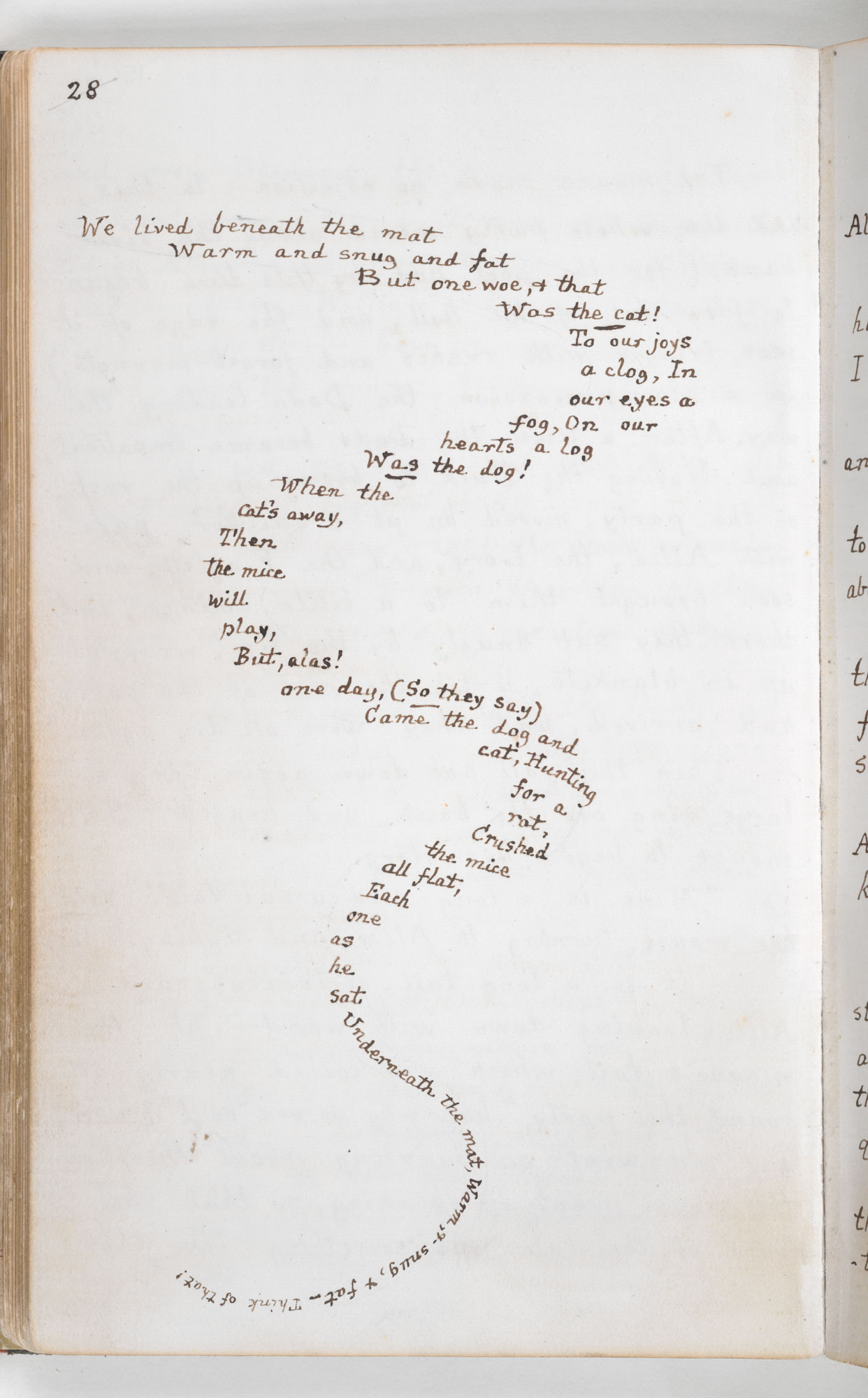
The original manuscript of Alice's Adventures Under Ground, 1863

During the course of the story's third chapter, a Mouse offers to tell Alice his history. "Mine is a long and a sad tale!" he begins, making Alice think that it means its tail, so that she pictures its recitation in the form of a twisted, tail-like shape.

It is a long tail, certainly, ...but why do you call it sad?" And she kept on puzzling about it while the Mouse was speaking, so that her idea of the tale was something like this:—

In the tale, the Mouse (speaking of itself in the third person) explains how a cur called Fury proposes the pastime of condemning it to death, himself serving as both judge and jury. "The Mouse's Tale" thus anticipates the nonsense trial at the end of the novel:

"Fury said to a mouse that he met in the house, 'Let us both go to law: I will prosecute you. Come, I'll take no denial: we must have a trial: for really this morning I've nothing to do.' Said the mouse to the cur, 'Such a trial, dear sir, with no jury or judge, would be wasting our breath.' 'I'll be judge, I'll be jury,' said cunning old Fury: 'I'll try the whole cause, and condemn you to death.'"

Although the Mouse claims that the "tale" will explain why he hates cats and dogs, the only villain in the printed poem is a dog; there is no actual explanation for the Mouse's animosity toward cats. However, Alice's Adventures Under Ground, the 1863 handwritten version of Alice in Wonderland, contains a different poem at this point (beginning, "We lived beneath the mat,/ Warm and snug and fat./ But one woe & that/ Was the cat!") which includes both cats and dogs as the enemies of the mice.

== Form ==
The poem foreshadows the 20th century calligramme in form, being not only in the shape of a tail but, in its handwritten version, allowing the final words to be inscribed upside-down. It has been variously described as shaped, patterned, figured or emblematic verse, in the tradition of such shaping that was later identified as the ancestor of concrete poetry. Carroll had control of the poem's layout in the original edition and it was he who stipulated that the font size should diminish as the poem progressed. Another commentator has explained that in this way “the poem works as a pictogram or concrete poem, in that its actual shape mimics an aspect of its subject matter. A tale told by a mouse is reproduced in the form of a mouse’s tail.”

The verbal relationship between the homonyms tale/tail was later made more explicit by some of the book's illustrators. Thus Willy Pogány juxtaposed the poem and a drawing of a mouse on the same page in a 1929 edition. And in Lisbeth Zwerger’s 1999 illustration the statement "Mine is a long and sad tale" is written along the Mouse's tail to make the same point. A student discovery in 1991 that the poem functioned as a "quadruple pun" was later widely reported. As well as the verbal play on tale/tail in the printed text, there were also visual puns in its original handwritten form. By reducing the poem there to its traditional stanza form, the first two are shaped like a mouse's body, with short dashes to indicate its paws, while a third longer line forms the tail. Furthermore, the technical term for the rhyme at the end is tail-rhyme. For the most part, the poem's page layout is so arranged that the rhyming words occur internally rather than at the end of lines. The rhyme right at the end is therefore truly made the tail-rhyme.

== Interpretation ==
Interpretations of the poem's function divide between finding a serious explanation of its playfulness, or else a more deeply hidden purpose. The former approach sees it as disrupting adult systems of logic, in line with the satire on the justice system in the trial at the end, the realisation of the futility of which finally awakens Alice. Another critic finds in it a summation of the plot of Aeschylus’ Oresteia. This too centred upon incompatibilities between different conceptions of justice, or between justice and equity.

== Translations ==
Translation of word-play, topical and cultural allusions are notoriously difficult from one language to another, a problem compounded when it is between different cultures. Warren Weaver’s study Alice in Many Tongues (University of Wisconsin, 1964) covered examples in some 42 languages and the strategies used to convey the various elements encountered there. The Chinese translation of 1922, for example, could not match the tale/tail pun but instead substituted an ingenious play on the word ‘sad’ in its place. Since then there have been several comparative studies of versions within a single language, including Swedish, French, Polish, and Hungarian.

== Artistic versions ==
There have been various vocal settings of the poem, the earliest of which was in Liza Lehmann’s Nonsense songs from Alice in Wonderland, a song-cycle for soprano, contralto, tenor and bass (London 1908). György Ligeti adapted the text as no.8 in his Nonsense Madrigals (1988–93), and Rena Geli for performance for chamber ensemble and female voice in 2003. Both the original and the printed versions were set as Mouse Tales for choir and piano by Bob Chilcott (Oxford University Press 2015).
