= Ideogramme =

Form of poetry

An ideogramme is a form of poetry that relies heavily on typographical elements, design, and layout.

It comparable in manner to onomatopoetics or onomatopoeia. With onomatopoeia the word said sounds like what it represents: Moo, Whack, Bang, etc. etc.. In an ideogramme a word or group of words visually embody their content.

One of the first and most recognizable ideogrammes is Guillaume Apollinaire's Il Pleut (It's Raining), written in 1916. It was published in his book Calligrammes: Poems of Peace and War. Often this form is grouped within the Futurist movement. But, it extends beyond it. ee cummings was not a Futurist and his poem l(a is often cited for use of the ideogramme.

In November 1917 at Vieux Colombier Apollinaire stated in his lecture New Spirit and the Poets that "Typographical artifices worked out with great audacity have the advantage of bringing to life a visual lyricism which was almost unknown before our age."
