= Easter Wings =

Poem by George Herbert

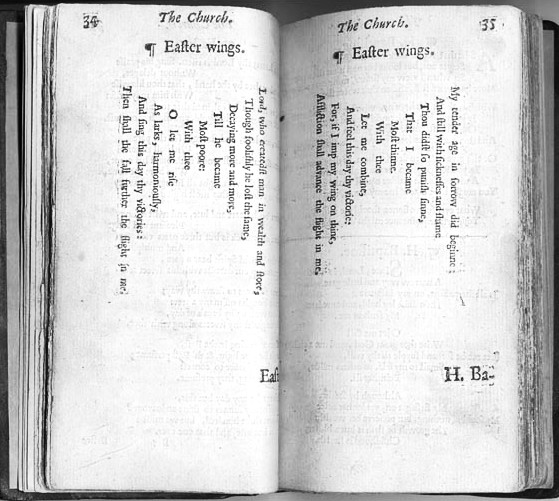
"Easter Wings" in the 1633 edition of The Temple

Easter Wings is a poem by George Herbert which was published in his posthumous collection, The Temple (1633). It was originally formatted sideways on facing pages and is in the tradition of shaped poems that goes back to ancient Greek sources.

== Literary background ==
The Renaissance revival of interest in ancient Greek poetry brought to light a few poems preserved in the Greek anthology in which the shape of the lay-out mimics the poem's sense. Among these was one in the shape of wings by Simmias of Rhodes. The poem is in the form of an allusive riddle whose subject is Eros, the god of love, but where the only hint of his wings is contained in the adjective referring to him, "swift-flying". These poems and their like were later imitated in Renaissance Neo-Latin verse and the fashion then spread to vernacular literatures as well.

Stephen Hawes was the first English author to take this up in his intricate "A pair of wings" in about 1500. But whereas the Classical example is shaped so that the wings rise and fall from the centre, as happens also in Herbert's "Easter Wings", Hawes makes the lines diminish to wing tips in a crescent from the wider body of the poem's centre and backs it up with an alternative short poem lying behind the main text.

== George Herbert and his contemporaries ==
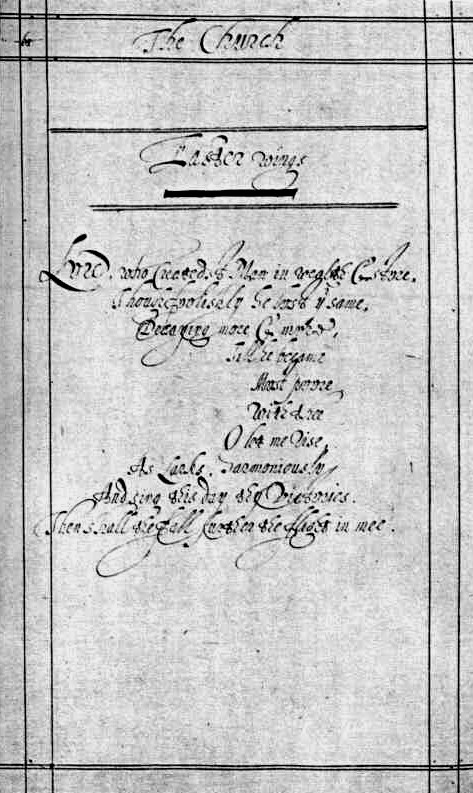
A copy of the manuscript written for presentation to the Cambridge University press in 1633

Herbert's poetry may be referred to the 16th century tradition of the emblem, which combines a motto with a simple symbolic picture and poetic explanation, as well as, in the case of "Easter Wings", the example of Greek shaped poetry. The poem's two-stanzas were originally formatted sideways across opposite pages on its first publication, making the likeness to two sets of wings more obvious. Another pattern poem appearing near the start of his collection, The Temple, was "The Altar".

There were three other poems in the shape of wings published later than Herbert's. One may have been written about the same time, but as in Herbert's case was not published until after the author's death. It appeared as a lyrical insert towards the end of William Bosworth's The Chaste and Lost Lovers (1651). In the case of Patrick Carey's "O that I had wings like a dove", the poem was written about 1651 but not printed until 1820. The 4-stanza poem is in a radically different form, with long lines at the beginning, middle and end, punctuated by shorter lines dividing them within the stanza.

Christopher Harvey's The Synagogue, originally published anonymously in 1640, announced itself on the title page to be "in imitation of Mr George Herbert". Their kinship was so close that subsequently the two collections were often published together. The six wing-shaped stanzas of Harvey's Cordis Volatus are on the same theme as Herbert's but lack his subtlety of treatment.

== Overview ==
"Easter Wings" is a religious meditation that focuses on the atonement of Jesus Christ. Its celebration of bodily and spiritual resurrection draws its theme from 1 Corinthians 15, and it is specially notable that the word 'victory' found in the Biblical text is repeated in both stanzas of the poem. As well as the poem's being emblematic of the redeemed soul overall, the expansion and contraction of the lines imitates the meaning of the words. Thus in the first stanza the line "O let me rise" occurs as the wing unfurls again and is answered by the theme of climbing in the second. There is also similar imitative wording at the centre of both stanzas, "Till he became/ Most poore" in the first being answered by "That I became/ Most thinne" in the second.

There was a reaction against this kind of writing in Augustan literature, with Herbert's poetry singled out as the most recognisable example of 'false taste'. In John Dryden's satire Mac Flecknoe, the new monarch of literary Nonsense is dismissed to pursue Baroque invention in

Some peaceful province in acrostic land.
There thou may'st wings display and altars raise,
And torture one poor word ten thousand ways.

And in case any doubt should remain, Joseph Addison went on to name the author that Dryden had in mind in an essay in The Spectator. It was Herbert, he maintained, who had helped revive "this obsolete kind of wit". That disapproval was to remain in place until the revival of critical interest in the Metaphysical Poets at the start of the 20th century. Since then Herbert's typography has been recognised as a significant adjunct to the poem's meaning.
