= George Herbert =

English poet, orator and Anglican priest (1593–1633)

The Reverend George Herbert
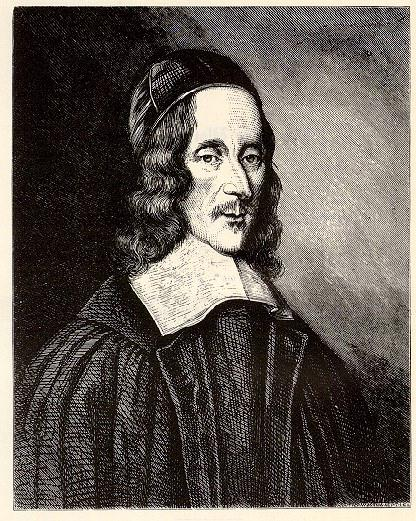
- Portrait by Robert White, 1674 (National Portrait Gallery)
- Born: 3 April 1593; Montgomery, Montgomeryshire, Wales
- Died: 1 March 1633 (aged 39); Bemerton, Wiltshire, England
- Education: Trinity College, Cambridge
- Occupations: Poet; priest; theologian; orator
- Writing career
- Notable works: Easter Wings; The Altar; The Collar
- Movement: Metaphysical poetry

George Herbert (3 April 1593 – 1 March 1633) was an English poet, orator, and priest of the Church of England. His poetry is associated with the writings of the metaphysical poets, and he is recognised as "one of the foremost British devotional lyricists." He was born in Wales into an artistic and wealthy family and largely raised in England. He received a good education that led to his admission to Trinity College, Cambridge, in 1609. He enrolled intending to become a priest, but became the University's Public Orator and attracted the attention of King James I. He sat in the Parliament of England in 1624 and briefly in 1625.

After the death of King James, Herbert renewed his interest in ordination. He gave up his secular ambitions in his mid-thirties and took holy orders in the Church of England, spending the rest of his life as the rector of the rural parish of Fugglestone St Peter, just outside Salisbury. He was noted for unfailing care for his parishioners, bringing the sacraments to them when they were ill, and providing food and clothing for those in need. Henry Vaughan called him "a most glorious saint and seer". He was never a healthy man and died of consumption at age 39.

== Biography ==
=== Early life and education ===
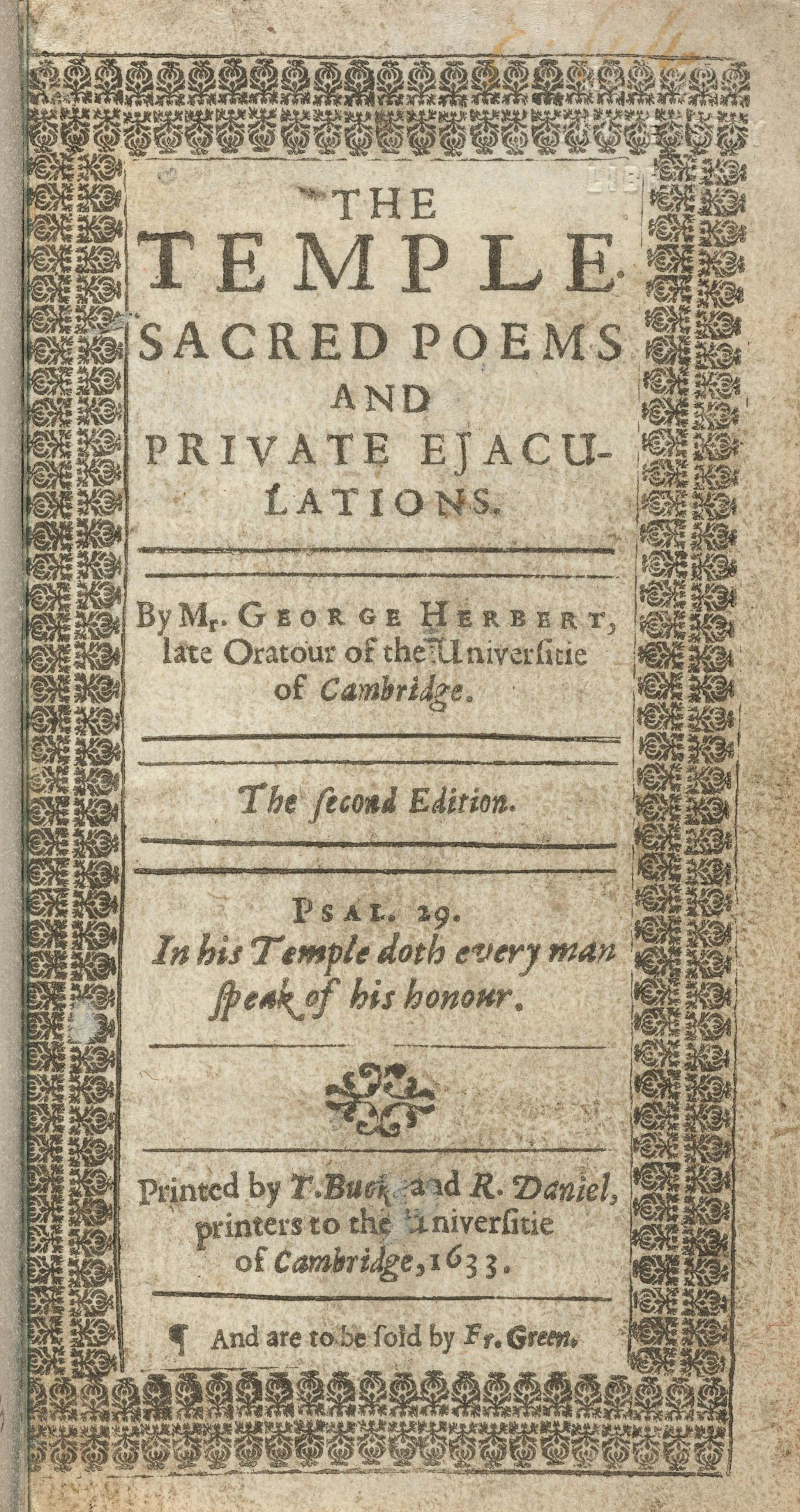
Herbert's The Temple

George Herbert was born on 3 April 1593 in Montgomery, Montgomeryshire, Wales, the son of Richard Herbert (died 1596) and his wife Magdalen née Newport, the daughter of Sir Richard Newport (1511–1570). George was one of 10 children. The Herbert family was wealthy and powerful in both national and local government, and George was descended from the same stock as the Earls of Pembroke. His father was a member of parliament, a justice of the peace, and later served for several years as custos rotulorum (keeper of the rolls) of Montgomeryshire. His mother was a patron and friend of John Donne and other poets, writers and artists. As George's godfather, Donne stood in after Richard Herbert died when George was three years old. Herbert and his siblings were then raised by his mother, who pressed for a good education for her children.

Herbert's eldest brother Edward (who inherited his late father's estates and was ultimately created Baron Herbert of Cherbury) became a soldier, diplomat, historian, poet, and philosopher whose religious writings led to his reputation as the "father of English deism". Herbert's younger brother was Sir Henry Herbert, Master of the Revels to Kings Charles I and II.

Herbert entered Westminster School at or around the age of 12 as a day pupil, although he later became a residential scholar. He was admitted on a scholarship to Trinity College, Cambridge in 1609, and graduated first with a Bachelor's and then with a Master's degree in 1616 at the age of 23. Subsequently, Herbert was elected a major fellow of his college and then appointed Reader in Rhetoric. In 1620 he stressed his fluency in Greek and Latin and attained election to the post of the University's Public Orator, a position he held until 1627.

In 1624, supported by his kinsman the 3rd Earl of Pembroke, Herbert became a member of parliament, representing Montgomery. While these positions normally presaged a career at court and King James I had shown him favour, circumstances worked against Herbert: the King died in 1625, and two influential patrons also died at about the same time. However, his parliamentary career may have ended already because, although a Mr Herbert is mentioned as a committee member, the Commons Journal for 1625 never mentions Mr. George Herbert, despite the preceding parliament's careful distinction. In short, Herbert made a shift in his path away from the political future he had been pursuing, and turned more fully toward a future in the church.

Herbert was presented with the prebend of Leighton Bromswold in the Diocese of Lincoln in 1626, whilst he was still a don at Trinity College, Cambridge, but not yet ordained. He was not present at his institution as prebend, and it is recorded that Peter Walker, his clerk, stood in as his proxy. In the same year his close Cambridge friend Nicholas Ferrar was ordained Deacon in Westminster Abbey by Bishop Laud on Trinity Sunday 1626 and went to Little Gidding, two miles down the road from Leighton Bromswold, to found a small community. Herbert raised money (and contributed his own) to restore the neglected church building at Leighton.

=== Marriage ===
In 1628 or 1629, Herbert lodged at Dauntsey House in the north of Wiltshire, the home of his stepfather's brother Henry Danvers and Henry's elderly widowed mother Elizabeth. A day's ride to the south, at Baynton House in Edington, lived the family of Henry's cousin Charles Danvers (died 1626) who is said to have had a desire for Herbert to marry his daughter Jane. It was arranged for Herbert and Jane to meet, and they found mutual affection; Jane was ten years younger than George. They were married at Edington church on 5 March 1629.

=== Priesthood ===
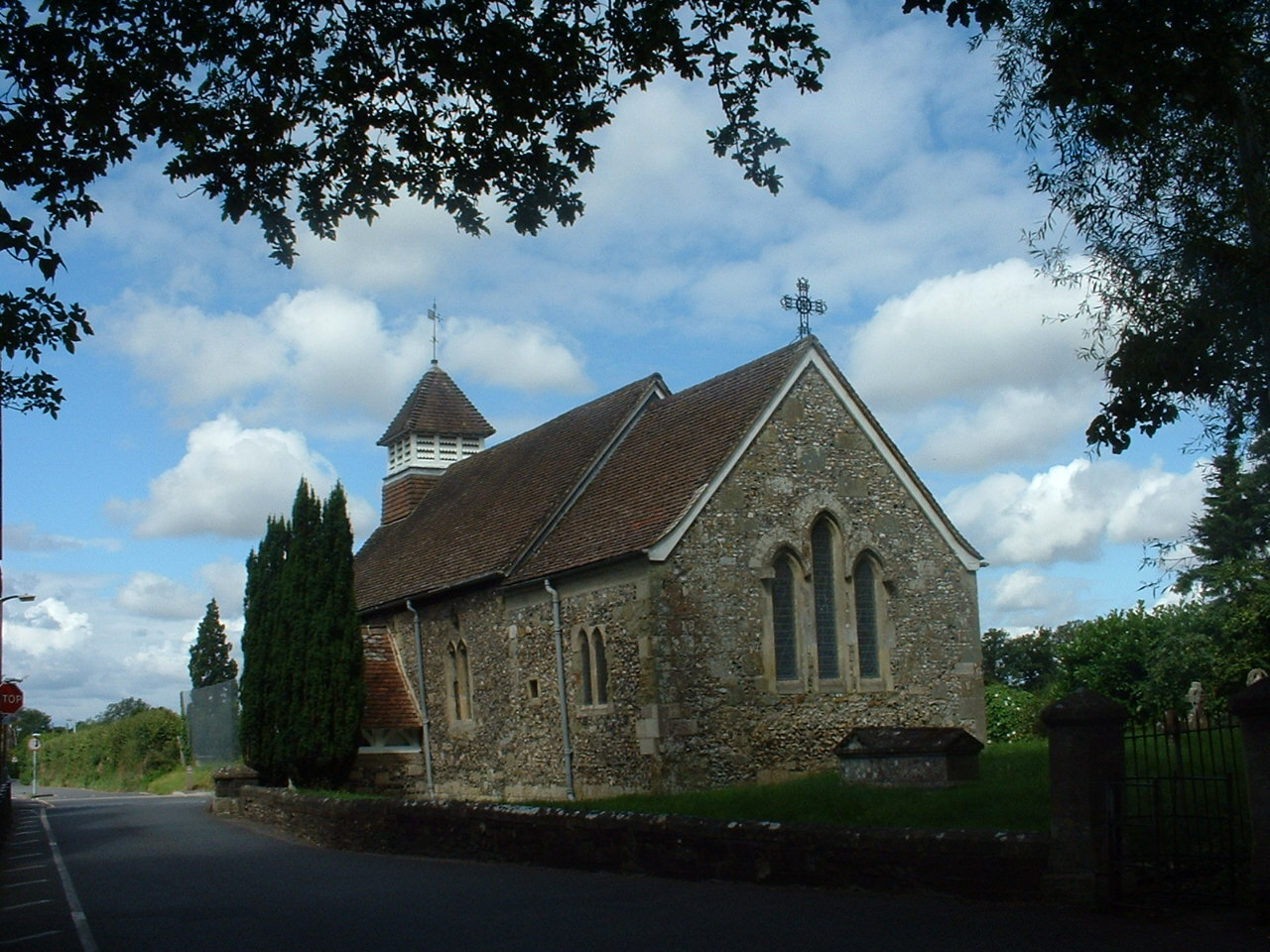
St Andrew's Church in Bemerton, Wiltshire, where Herbert served as rector and in which he was buried

In 1629, Herbert decided to enter the priesthood and the next year was appointed rector of the rural parish of Fugglestone St Peter with Bemerton, near Salisbury in Wiltshire, about 75 miles south-west of London. He was responsible for two small churches: the 13th-century parish church of St Peter at Fugglestone, near Wilton, and the 14th-century chapel of St Andrew at Bemerton, closer to Salisbury at the other end of the parish. Here he lived, preached and wrote poetry; he also helped to rebuild the Bemerton church and adjacent rectory out of his own funds. His appointment may have again been assisted by the Earl of Pembroke, whose family seat at Wilton House lay close to Fugglestone church.

While at Bemerton, Herbert revised and added to his collection of poems entitled The Temple. He also wrote a guide to rural ministry, entitled A Priest to the Temple or, The Country Parson His Character and Rule of Holy Life, which he himself described as "a Mark to aim at", and which has remained influential to the present day. Having married shortly before taking up his post, he and his wife gave a home to three orphaned nieces. Together with their servants, they crossed the lane for services in the small St Andrew's church twice every day. Twice a week Herbert made the short journey into Salisbury to attend services at the cathedral, and afterwards would make music with the cathedral musicians.

=== Death ===
Herbert's time at Bemerton was short. Having suffered for most of his life from poor health, in 1633 he died of consumption, only three years after taking holy orders. Jane died in 1661.

== Poetry ==
Herbert wrote poetry in English, Latin and Greek. Shortly before his death, he sent a literary manuscript to his friend Nicholas Ferrar, reportedly telling him to publish the poems if he thought they might "turn to the advantage of any dejected poor soul", otherwise to burn them. In 1633 all of his English poems were published in The Temple: Sacred Poems and Private Ejaculations, with a preface by Ferrar. The book went through eight editions by 1690. According to Izaak Walton, when Herbert sent the manuscript to Ferrar, he said that "he shall find in it a picture of the many spiritual conflicts that have passed between God and my soul, before I could subject mine to the will of Jesus, my Master". In this Herbert used the format of the poems to reinforce the theme he was trying to portray. Beginning with "The Church Porch", they proceed via "The Altar" to "The Sacrifice", and so onwards through the collection.

All of Herbert's surviving English poems are on religious themes and are characterised by directness of expression enlivened by original but apt conceits in which, in the Metaphysical manner, the likeness is of function rather than visual. In "The Windows", for example, he compares a righteous preacher to glass through which God's light shines more effectively than in his words. Commenting on his religious poetry later in the 17th century, Richard Baxter said, "Herbert speaks to God like one that really believeth in God, and whose business in the world is most with God. Heart-work and heaven-work make up his books". Helen Gardner later added "head-work" to this characterisation in acknowledgement of his "intellectual vivacity". It has also been pointed out how Herbert uses puns and wordplay to "convey the relationships between the world of daily reality and the world of transcendent reality that gives it meaning. The kind of word that functions on two or more planes is his device for making his poem an expression of that relationship."

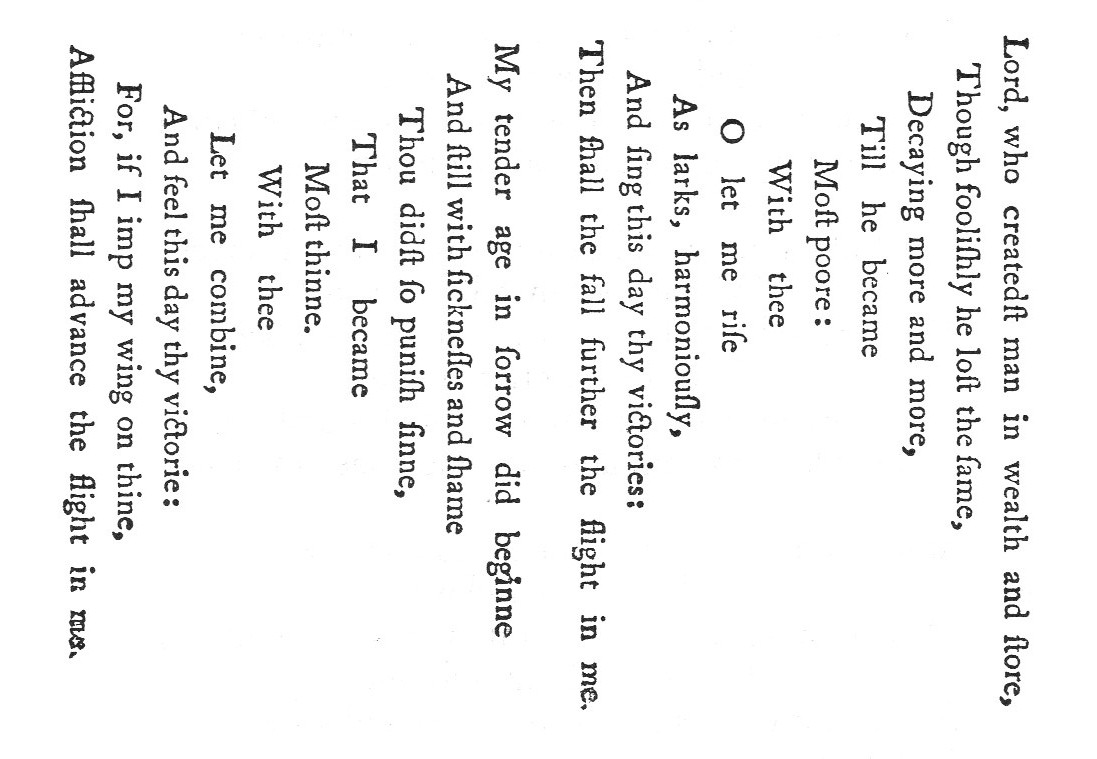
Herbert's "Easter Wings" printed sideways on facing pages

Visually too the poems are varied in such a way as to enhance their meaning, with intricate rhyme schemes, stanzas combining different line lengths and other ingenious formal devices. The most obvious examples are pattern poems like "The Altar", in which the shorter and longer lines are arranged on the page in the shape of an altar. The visual appeal is reinforced by the conceit of its construction from a broken, stony heart, representing the personal offering of himself as a sacrifice upon it. Built into this is an allusion to Psalm 51:17: "The sacrifices of God are a broken spirit; a broken and a contrite heart." In the case of "Easter Wings" (illustrated here), the words were printed sideways on two facing pages so that the lines there suggest outspread wings. The words of the poem are paralleled between stanzas and mimic the opening and closing of the wings. In Herbert's poems formal ingenuity is not an end in itself but is employed only as an auxiliary to its meaning.

The formal devices employed to convey that meaning are wide in range. In his meditation on the passage "Our life is hid with Christ in God", the capitalised words "MY LIFE IS HID IN HIM THAT IS MY TREASURE" move across successive lines and demonstrate what is spoken of in the text. Opposites are brought together in "Bitter-Sweet" for the same purpose. Echo and variation are also common. The exclamations at the head and foot of each stanza in "Sighs and Grones" are one example. The diminishing truncated rhymes in "Paradise" are another. There is also an echo-dialogue after each line in "Heaven", other examples of which are found in the poetry of his brother Lord Herbert of Cherbury. Alternative rhymes are offered at the end of the stanzas in "The Water-Course", while the "Mary/Army Anagram" is represented in its title. In "The Collar", Joseph Summers argues, Herbert goes so far as to use apparent formlessness as a formal and thematic device: "the poem contains all the elements of order in violent disorder" until the end, when the final four lines' regularity restores the reader's sense of "the necessity of order".

Once the taste for this display of Baroque wit had passed, the satirist John Dryden was to dismiss it as so many means to "torture one poor word ten thousand ways." Though Herbert remained esteemed for his piety, the poetic skill with which he expressed his thought had to wait centuries to be admired again.

== Prose ==
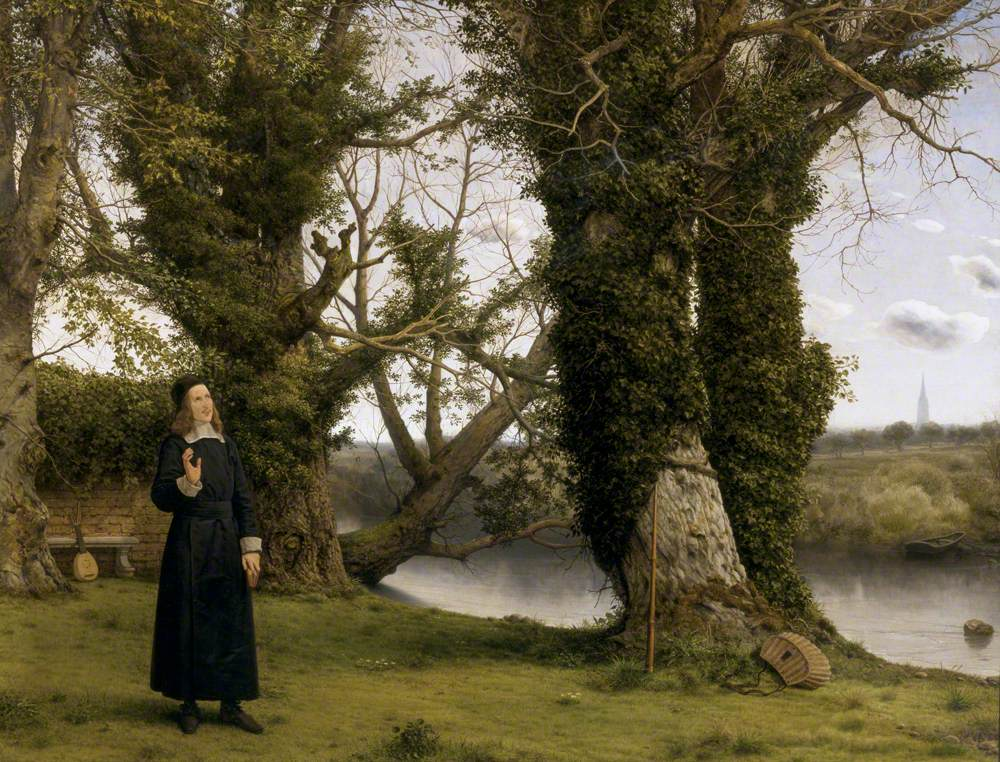
George Herbert at Bemerton by William Dyce, 1860

Herbert's only prose work, A Priest to the Temple (usually known as The Country Parson), offers practical advice to rural clergy. In it, he advises that "things of ordinary use" such as ploughs, leaven, or dances, could be made to "serve for lights even of Heavenly Truths". It was first published in 1652 as part of Herbert's Remains, or Sundry Pieces of That Sweet Singer, Mr. George Herbert, edited by Barnabas Oley. The first edition was prefixed with unsigned preface by Oley, which was used as one of the sources for Izaak Walton's biography of Herbert, first published in 1670. The second edition appeared in 1671 as A Priest to the Temple or the Country Parson, with a new preface, this time signed by Oley.

Like many of his literary contemporaries, Herbert was a collector of proverbs. His Outlandish Proverbs was published in 1640, listing over 1000 aphorisms in English, but gathered from many countries (in Herbert's day, 'outlandish' meant foreign). The collection included many sayings repeated to this day, for example, "His bark is worse than his bite" and "Who is so deaf, as he that will not hear?" These and an additional 150 proverbs were included in a later collection entitled Jacula Prudentum (sometimes seen as Jacula Prudentium), dated 1651 and published in 1652 as part of Oley's Herbert's Remains.

== Musical settings ==
Herbert came from a musical family. His mother Magdalen Herbert was a friend of the composers William Byrd and John Bull, and encouraged her children's musical education; his brother Edward Herbert of Cherbury was a skilled lutenist and composer. George Herbert played the lute and viol, and "sett his own lyricks or sacred poems". Musical pursuits interested him all through his life and his biographer, Izaak Walton, records that he rose to play the lute during his final illness. Walton also gave it as his opinion that he composed "such hymns and anthems as he and the angels now sing in heaven", while Walton's friend Charles Cotton described him as a "soul composed of harmonies".

More than ninety of Herbert's poems have been set for singing over the centuries, some of them multiple times. In his own century, there were settings of "Longing" by Henry Purcell and "And art thou grieved" by John Blow. Some forty were adapted for the Methodist hymnal by the Wesley brothers, among them "Teach me my God and King", which found its place in one version or another in 223 hymnals. Another poem, "Let all the world in every corner sing", was published in 103 hymnals, of which one is a French version. Other languages into which his work has been translated for musical settings include Spanish, Catalan and German.

In the 20th century, "Vertue" alone achieved ten settings, one of them in French. Among modern composers who set Herbert's poems were Ralph Vaughan Williams, who used four in Five Mystical Songs (1911), of which "Easter" was the first and "Antiphon II" the last; Edmund Rubbra, who set "Easter" as the first of his Two songs for voice and string trio (op. 2, 1921); and Benjamin Britten and William Walton, who both set "Antiphon" too. Eva Ruth Spalding's setting of 'Easter Words' is used in her Three Melodies (1929); and Robin Milford used the original Fitzwilliam manuscript's setting of the second part of "Easter" for his cantata Easter Morning (1932), set in two parts for soprano soloist and choir of children's or women's voices.

Post-war settings include Mary Plumstead's of "Grateful Heart" for unison voices and piano (1977) and Kenneth Leighton's of "The Flower" for voice and organ, which he renamed "These Are Thy Wonders" (Op.84, 1981). Ned Rorem included one Herbert setting in his "10 poems for voice, oboe and strings" (1982), and Judith Weir set three poems in her 2005 choral work Vertue.

== Legacy ==
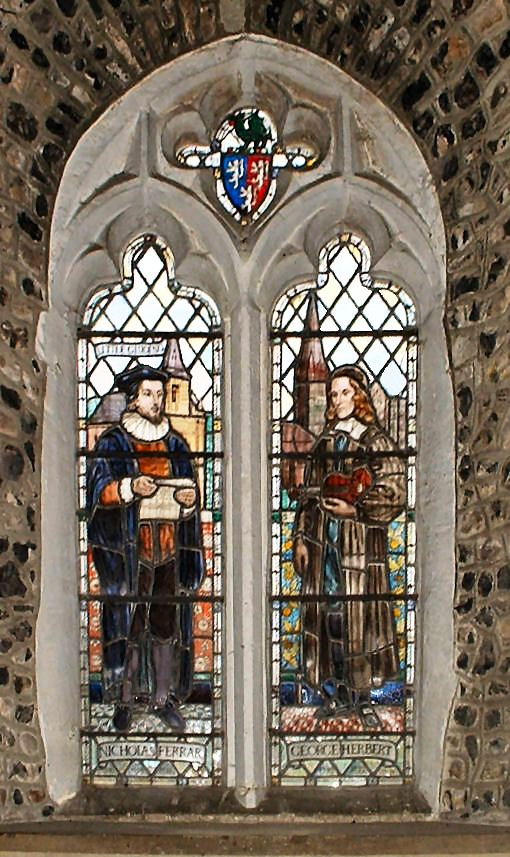
Memorial window to Herbert and Nicholas Ferrar in St Andrew's Church, Bemerton

The earliest portrait of Herbert was engraved long after his death by Robert White for Walton's biography of the poet in 1674. Now in London's National Portrait Gallery, it served as basis for later engravings, such as those by White's apprentice John Sturt and by Henry Hoppner Meyer in 1829.

Among later artistic commemorations is William Dyce's oil painting of "George Herbert at Bemerton" (1860) in the Guildhall Art Gallery, London. The poet is pictured in his riverside garden, prayerbook in hand. Over the meadows is Salisbury Cathedral, where he used to join in the musical evensong; his lute leans against a stone bench and against a tree a fishing rod is propped, a reminder of his first biographer, Isaac Walton. There is also a musical reference in Charles West Cope's "George Herbert and his mother" (1872), which is in Gallery Oldham: the mother points a poem out to him in a room that has a virginals in the background.

Most representations of Herbert, however, are in stained glass windows, of which there are several in churches and cathedrals. They include Westminster Abbey, Salisbury Cathedral and All Saints' Church, Cambridge. His own St Andrew's Church in Bemerton installed in 1934 a memorial window, which he shares with Nicholas Ferrar. In addition, there is a statue of Herbert in his canonical robes, based in part on the Robert White portrait, in a niche on the West Front of Salisbury Cathedral.

== Veneration ==
Saint George Herbert
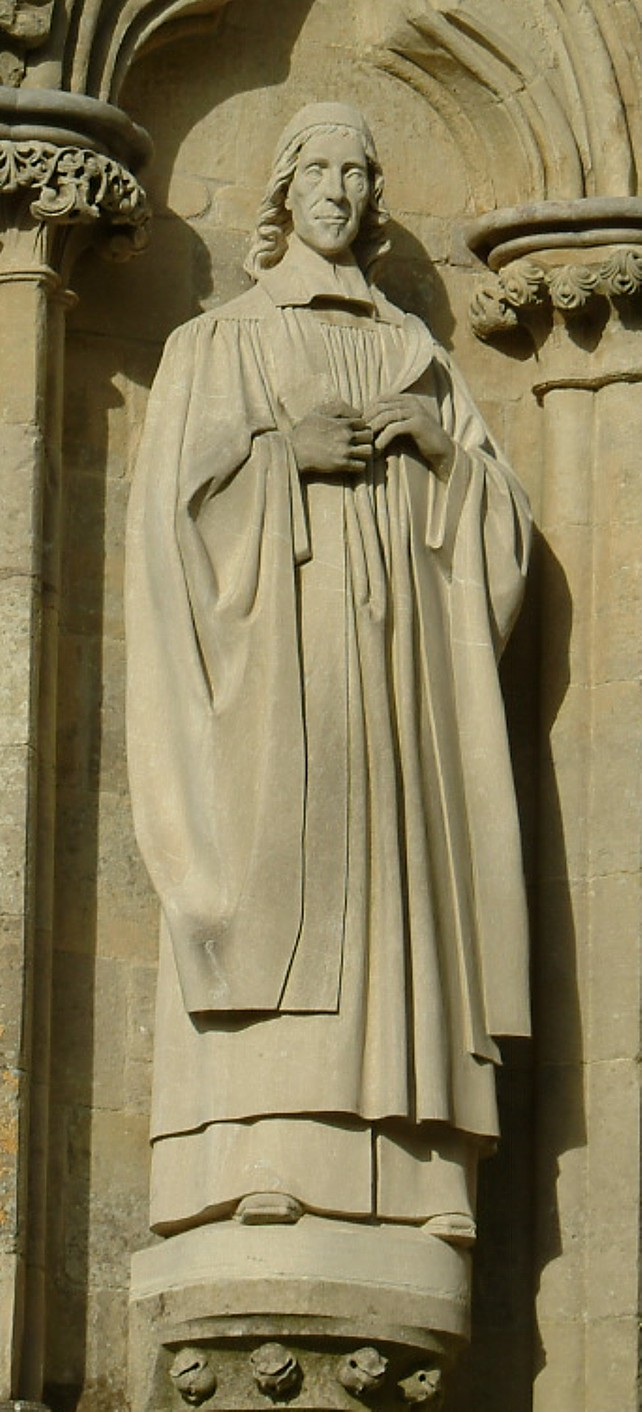
- The Herbert niche, Salisbury Cathedral
- Venerated in: Anglican Communion, Lutheranism
- Feast: 27 February (Anglican), 1 March (Lutheran)

In the liturgy Herbert is remembered in the Church of England and the Episcopal Church on 27 February; also on 1 March in, for example, the Calendar of Saints of the Evangelical Lutheran Church in America, being the day of his death. There are various collects for the day, of which one is based on his poem "The Elixir":

Our God and King, who called your servant George Herbert from the pursuit of worldly honors to be a pastor of souls, a poet, and a priest in your temple: Give us grace, we pray, joyfully to perform the tasks you give us to do, knowing that nothing is menial or common that is done for your sake ... Amen.

The quote "All may have, if they dare try, a glorious life, or a grave" from Herbert's "The Church Porch" is inscribed on the outer wall of St. John's Church, Waterloo.

== Works ==
- 1623: Oratio Qua auspicatissimum Serenissimi Principis Caroli.
- 1627: Memoriae Matris Sacrum, printed with A Sermon of commemoracion of the ladye Danvers by John Donne... with other Commemoracions of her by George Herbert (London: Philemon Stephens and Christopher Meredith).
- 1633: The Temple, Sacred Poems and Private Ejaculations (Cambridge: Printed by Thomas Buck and Roger Daniel).
- 1640: Outlandish Proverbs, reissued in 1651 under the title Jacula Prudentum [Arrows of the Wise]. Or Outlandish Proverbs, Sentences, &c.
- 1652: Herbert's Remains, Or, Sundry Pieces Of that sweet Singer of the Temple consisting of his collected writings from A Priest to the Temple, Jacula Prudentum, Sentences, & c., as well as a letter, several prayers, and three Latin poems (London: Printed for Timothy Garthwait).
- Herbert, George (1703). The Temple: sacred poems and private ejaculations. London: Jeffery Wale.
- T. Y. Crowell, ed. (1881). The Works of George Herbert in Prose and Verse: Edited from the Latest Editions, with Memoir, Explanatory Notes, Etc. New York: John Wurtele Lovell.
- Blythe, Ronald, ed. (2003). A Priest to the Temple Or the Country Parson: With Selected Poems. Hymns Ancient and Modern. ISBN 978-1-85311-532-5.
