= The Collar (poem) =

Poem by George Herbert

"The Collar" is a poem by Welsh poet George Herbert published in 1633, and is a part of a collection of poems within Herbert's book The Temple. The poem depicts a man who is experiencing a loss of faith and feelings of anger over the commitment he has made to God. He feels that his efforts in committing himself to his faith have been fruitless, and begins to manifest a life for himself without religious parameters. He denounces his commitments and proclaims himself "free". The poem's themes include the struggle with one's beliefs and the desire for autonomy in defiance of religious restriction. The speaker is trying to create his own limits, to lead himself, rather than following God. He tries to convince himself that a life of freedom will bring him the satisfaction that his faith has failed to provide.

== The Collar ==
Modern Version

The Collar

I struck the board, and cried, "No more;
I will abroad!
What? shall I ever sigh and pine?
My lines and life are free, free as the road,
Loose as the wind, as large as store.
Shall I be still in suit?
Have I no harvest but a thorn
To let me blood, and not restore
What I have lost with cordial fruit?
Sure there was wine
Before my sighs did dry it; there was corn
Before my tears did drown it.
Is the year only lost to me?
Have I no bays to crown it,
No flowers, no garlands gay? All blasted?
All wasted?
Not so, my heart; but there is fruit,
And thou hast hands.
Recover all thy sigh-blown age
On double pleasures: leave thy cold dispute
Of what is fit and not. Forsake thy cage,
Thy rope of sands,
Which petty thoughts have made, and made to thee
Good cable, to enforce and draw,
And be thy law,
While thou didst wink and wouldst not see.
Away! take heed;
I will abroad.
Call in thy death's-head there; tie up thy fears;
He that forbears
To suit and serve his need
Deserves his load."
But as I raved and grew more fierce and wild
At every word,
Me thought I heard one calling, Child!
And I replied My Lord.

Original Version

The Collar

I struck the board, and cry'd, No more,
I will abroad.
What? Shall I ever sigh and pine?
My lines and life are free; free as the rode,
Loose as the winde, as large as store.
Shall I be still in fruit?
Have I no harvest but a thorn
To let me bloud, and not restore
What I have lost with cordiall fruit?
Sure there was wine
Before my sighs did drie it: there was corn
Before my tears did drown it.
Is the yeare onely lost to me?
Have I no bayes to crown it?
No flowers, no garlands gay? All blasted?
All wasted?
Not so, my heart: but there is fruit,
And thou hast hands.
Recover all thy sigh-blown age
On double pleasures: leave thy cold dispute
Of what is fit, and not forsake thy cage,
Thy rope of sands,
Which pettie thoughts have made, and made to thee
Good cable, to enforce and draw,
And by thy law,
While thou didst wink and wouldst not see.
Away; take heed:
I will abroad.
Call in thy deaths head there: tie up thy fears.
He that forbears
To suit and serve his need,
Deserves his load.
But as I rav'd and grevv more fierce and wilde
At every word,
Me thoughts I heard one calling, Childe:
And I reply'd, My Lord.

== Synopsis ==
"The Collar" portrays a man who is relaying a previous struggle he has had with his faith. The poem begins with the speaker striking a board, most likely a pulpit or altar. The physical outburst is then followed quickly by a verbal one, as the speaker declares that he "...will abroad!", or leave his current place. The speaker questions his religious commitment, which has not brought him the fulfillment he seeks. He thinks he can lead a life which will yield “double” the pleasures he sought while living as a Christian. The speaker then announces that his life will be as “free as the road” and as “loose as the wind”, meaning that he plans to live boundlessly, without restriction. The speaker admits that there were things which he did treasure, but his sadness and lack of appreciation ruined each one. The speaker also asks if there is anything of beauty left, wonders if he is alone in this loss, and laments that he has nothing to show for the life he has lived for God.

The speaker then decides to abandon this state of pining and misery, to no longer worry about living a pious life. He chooses instead to live only for himself, instead of occupying his "cage" that he has seemingly made of his own doing; he claims his cage was built upon “petty thoughts”, meaning that God himself did not place the speaker in the cage, but rather the speaker placed himself there by believing in a false spirituality.

The speaker again tells himself to "abroad", to leave this life behind. He assures himself that he will make preparations by “tying up” his fears, so that they do not hang over him any longer. He claims that anyone who would serve to God the way he chose "deserves" the load he bears as a result. The speaker suddenly begins to rave, flying into a mad state of anger. The speaker suddenly hears a voice call, "Child!" and the man immediately calms himself, replies to the voice with the simple acknowledgement: "My Lord". The speaker has recognized God's presence, feels chided and immediately submissive to a greater One than himself alone, once again. His ravings are forgotten once God shows himself to the speaker, suggesting that his commitment to his faith has not been fruitless after all, or is at least ongoing.

== Analysis ==
The title of the poem, The Collar, is symbolic; it seems to represent the relationship between the man within the poem and God. "Collar" in this poem may refer to a clerical collar, which priests wear as a religious symbol. To take off the collar is to revoke one's dedication to ministry. The title may also refer to the term "to slip the collar" or to slip out and avoid the restraints of the church.

Herbert portrays the collar as a form of restraint for priests and as a play on words, conveying that the collar can be seen as one for a slave to it, or rather to Christianity. A collar, after all, is a restrictive garment, often a symbol of ownership. Paul M. Levitt and Kenneth G. Johnston introduce the idea that the use of the word "collar" by Herbert can be seen in a nautical sense—as the rope that supports and maintains the main mast of a ship, preventing it from moving from its position. Levitt and Johnston compare the poem's speaker to the mast of a ship, and the mast of the ship to a clerical collar: each are being held in place by restraints.

There is also the possibility that the poem uses the title sonically, because "collar" sounds like the words "caller" and "choler." Dale B. J. Randall points out that this poem is a story of a choleric man who has a burst of strong emotion, connecting the illness to the line "...But as I raved and grew more fierce and wild...". Randall also points out that the pun pertaining to "caller" is the idea that the "caller" is God, who is calling on the speaker in the line, "Me thought I heard one calling Child..." at the end of the poem.

Barbara Leah Harman points out that the beginning of the poem starts at the end of a man's journey and the beginning of a new one. The speaker isn't a "present-tense speaker" but a "duplicator of present-tense speech". Harman explains the speaker has reaped what he has sown, and the poem signifies the use of the word "harvest" as metaphorical, meaning the fruit of his labor has not been bountiful.

"I struck the board, and cried, "No more;

I will abroad!

What? shall I ever sigh and pine?

My lines and life are free, free as the road,

Loose as the wind, as large as store.

Shall I be still in suit?"

In the first six lines, the reader is clued in to the conflict: a man struggling with his faith. The speaker has decided to abroad, or to abandon his current life. In another poem by Herbert, "Content", the speaker warns himself to avoid "abroading" and listening to his "muttering thoughts". Herbert's poetry often follows this theme; man's relationship to his faith.

The speaker declares, "My lines and life are free, free as the road, loose as the wind..."(lines 3-4), meaning that his restraints aren't physical but spiritual, and he is considering why he should remain in God's service. He is declaring that there is a whole world beyond the life he's currently living and much to experience. The man is yearning earthly desires and has been blinded by the fact that God has not provided the riches he feels he deserves.

The words "no more" in line 1 introduce the man's feelings, as if he has experienced too much turmoil, but now feels angry enough to leave his present life. He declares, "I will abroad!"

Levitt and Johnston make the claim that the "board" the speaker strikes in line 1 is meant to represent the deck of a ship. However, Dale B. J. Randall points out that the use of the word could be multi-layered, the most sensible option being a communion table. Daniel Rubey backs this idea, pointing out that the board may indeed be correlated to a Communion table, keeping with the religious theme of the poem.

"Have I no harvest but a thorn

To let me blood, and not restore

What I have lost with cordial fruit?

Sure there was wine

Before my sighs did dry it; there was corn

Before my tears did drown it.

Is the year only lost to me?

Have I no bays to crown it,

No flowers, no garlands gay? All blasted?

All wasted?"

In lines seven to fifteen, the speaker explains that his harvest—his work—hasn't produced the kind of abundance he desires. The line, "Have I no harvest but a thorn..." relates to the Bible verse Jeremiah 12:13: "They will sow wheat but reap thorns; they will wear themselves out but gain nothing. They will bear the shame of their harvest..." The speaker questions why he hasn't received this, which he feels he has earned through his dedication to God. He admits reluctantly that "Sure there was wine...there was corn..." (Lines 10-11), but these payments are washed away by his inability to be grateful for such things. Wine and corn may symbolize bread and wine used in Communion, which calls back to the image of the speaker slamming his hand down on a communion table.

In line thirteen, the speaker wonders, "...the year only lost to me?", showing that he questions whether he is the only one not receiving God's favor. By this point the speaker has become so concerned with his desire for freedom that he gets lost in the idea of being a slave to God; he forgets that while following God means to bear a burden, it is not one which is difficult or impossible. This alludes to the Bible verse Matthew 11:30: "For my yoke is easy and my burden is light."

"Not so, my heart; but there is fruit,

And thou hast hands.

Recover all thy sigh-blown age

On double pleasures: leave thy cold dispute

Of what is fit and not. Forsake thy cage,

Thy rope of sands,

Which petty thoughts have made, and made to thee

Good cable, to enforce and draw,

And be thy law,

While thou didst wink and wouldst not see.

Away! take heed;

I will abroad."

In lines sixteen to twenty-seven, the speaker discusses other ways to enjoy life's pleasures and how he can achieve them on his own. He appears to be convincing himself that there are better ways of living than the life he has chosen for himself. The speaker no longer seems concerned with being sinful or sinless. He decides to end his avoidance of "double pleasures", which he couldn't partake in because of his faith. He seems less concerned with what is right or wrong and determined to forsake the ties that bind him to a life of religious servitude.

The line, "While thou didst wink and wouldst not see" may connect to the Bible verse, "Who winks with their eye is plotting perversity; whoever purses their lips is bent on evil." (Proverbs 16:30). The speaker may be insinuating that these thoughts have been building over time, and his plot to desert his religion has been growing in his mind until now: the breaking point.

"Call in thy death's-head there; tie up thy fears;

He that forbears

To suit and serve his need

Deserves his load."

But as I raved and grew more fierce and wild

At every word,

Me thought I heard one calling, Child!

And I replied My Lord."

In this section, the speaker refers to a memento mori, a figure which exists as a reminder of the fact that death comes for all in the end. The speaker is aware that he is not immortal, and this realization inspires him to seek fulfillment while he is physically present on earth. He decides to "tie up his fears" or reign them in, so they can no longer hang over him and threaten his happiness. He then declares that those who would sacrifice their personal desires and ambitions to commit to a life of servitude "deserve" the load they bear; this judgment seems to be a criticism upon himself for not abandoning his religion sooner.

As his ravings increase in intensity, his dedication to this new decision more solidified, it seems the speaker will never calm himself. Then he hears the voice of God calling to him: "Child!" In the end, the man regains his faith in the Lord because he realizes he is not shouting into an abyss: God hears him, and that is all the speaker needs to know to re-enter his life of servitude. The speaker replies to God with "My Lord", the possessive language signifying his spiritual dedication.

Michael Martin explains that the speaker didn't hear from God because of his decision to stray away from Him, or because he spoke against Him, but because of God's grace; his desire to comfort the speaker is what motivated the gentle admonishment. Martin explains that this immediate forgiveness of the speaker's outcry against God is meant to show His boundless grace. Martin also points out that Hebert purposefully rhymes "word" with "Lord" in order to show that the speaker finds immediate comfort in receiving nothing but a single word from God.

R. L. Colie discusses the idea of "muteness with grace" or becoming silent after seeing or hearing from God. Colie also explains the speaker has no difficulty in defying God, speaking against him and discarding the sanctity of communion, but with one word from God, the speaker is placated.

=== Poetic structure ===
The rhyme scheme of the poem is:

Poem

1.)I struck the board, and cried, "No more;

2.)I will abroad!

3.)What? shall I ever sigh and pine?

4.)My lines and life are free, free as the road,

5.)Loose as the wind, as large as store.

6.)Shall I be still in suit?

7.)Have I no harvest but a thorn

8.)To let me blood, and not restore

9.)What I have lost with cordial fruit?

10.)Sure there was wine

11.)Before my sighs did dry it; there was corn

12.)Before my tears did drown it.

13.)Is the year only lost to me?

14.)Have I no bays to crown it,

15.)No flowers, no garlands gay? All blasted?

16.)All wasted?

17.)Not so, my heart; but there is fruit,

18.)And thou hast hands.

19.)Recover all thy sigh-blown age

20.)On double pleasures: leave thy cold dispute

21.)Of what is fit and not. Forsake thy cage,

22.)Thy rope of sands,

23.)Which petty thoughts have made, and made to thee

24.)Good cable, to enforce and draw,

25.)And be thy law,

26.)While thou didst wink and wouldst not see.

27.)Away! take heed;

28.)I will abroad.

29.)Call in thy death's-head there; tie up thy fears;

30.)He that forbears

31.)To suit and serve his need

32.)Deserves his load."

33.)But as I raved and grew more fierce and wild

34.)At every word,

35.)Methought I heard one calling, Child!

36.)And I replied My Lord.

Rhyme Scheme

1.) A

2.) B

3.) C

4.) B

5.) A

6.) D

7.) E

8.) A

9.) D

10.) C

11.) E

12.) F

13.) G

14.) F

15.) H

16.) H

17.) D

18.) I

19.) J

20.) D

21.) J

22.) I

23.) G

24.) K

25.) K

26.) G

27.) L

28.) B

29.) M

30.) M

31.) L

32.) B

33.) N

34.) O

35.) N

36.) O

Syllables per line

1.) 8 syllables

2.) 4 syllables

3.) 8 syllables

4.) 10 syllables

5.) 8 syllables

6.) 6 syllables

7.) 8 syllables

8.) 8 syllables

9.) 8 syllables

10.) 4 syllables

11.) 10 syllables

12.) 7 syllables

13.) 8 syllables

14.) 7 syllables

15.) 10 syllables

16.) 3 syllables

17.) 8 syllables

18.) 4 syllables

19.) 8 syllables

20.) 10 syllables

21.) 10 syllables

22.) 4 syllables

23.) 10 syllables

24.) 8 syllables

25.) 4 syllables

26.) 8 syllables

27.) 4 syllables

28.) 4 syllables

29.) 10 syllables

30.) 4 syllables

31.) 6 syllables

32.) 4 syllables

33.) 10 syllables

34.) 4 syllables

35.) 8 syllables

36.) 6 syllables

Scansion

" I struck the board, and cried 'No more;                    UX UX UX UX

                     I will abroad!                                UX UX

What? shall I ever sigh and pine?                            XX UX UX UX

My lines and life are free, free as the road,                UX UX UX XU UX

Loose as the wind, as large as store.                        XU UX UX UX

      Shall I be still in suit?                              UX UX UX

Have I no harvest but a thorn                                UX UX UX UX

To let me blood, and not restore                             UX UX UX UX

What I have lost with cordial fruit?                         UX UX UX UX

      Sure there was wine                                    UX UX

Before my sighs did dry it; there was corn                   UX UX UX UX UX

Before my tears did drown it.                                UX UX UX U

    Is the year only lost to me?                             UUX UUX UX

      Have I no bays to crown it,                            UX UX UX U

 No flowers, no garlands gay? All blasted?                   UX UX UX UX U

               All wasted?                                   UXU

   Not so, my heart; but there is fruit,                     UX UX UX UX

         And thou hast hands.                                UX UX

Recover all thy sigh-blown age                               UXU UXU UX

 On double pleasures: leave thy cold dispute                 UX UX UX UX UX

Of what is fit and not. Forsake thy cage,                    UX UX UX UX UX

           Thy rope of sands,                                UX UX

Which petty thoughts have made, and made to thee             UX UX UX UX UX

Good cable, to enforce and draw,                             UX UX UX UX

        And be thy law,                                      UX UX

While thou didst wink and wouldst not see.                   UX UX UX UX

  Away! take heed;                                           XX UX

   I will abroad.                                            UX UX

Call in thy death's-head there; tie up thy fears;            UX UX UX UX UX

       He that forbears                                      UX UX

      To suit and serve his need                             UX UX UX

       Deserves his load.'                                   UX UX

But as I raved and grew more fierce and wild                 UX UX UX UX UX

       At every word,                                        UX UX

 Me thought I heard one calling, Child!                      UX UX UX UX

       And I replied My Lord.                                UX UX UX

P

== Critical reception ==
In "Herbert's 'The Collar': A Nautical Metaphor" Paul M. Levitt and Kenneth G. Johnston claim that the poem portrays the idea that people must experience spiritual turmoil and then be able to find peace and strength at the end. They explain that the man within the poem was able to find peace at the end instead of feeling controlled by religion or the Church, because his desire for adventures he wasn't given disappeared along with the discontent of his life.

In the book The Poetry of Meditation by Louis L. Martz, he explains the speaker within the poem eventually returns to following God, and the poem represents a "convincing" situation that expresses the "blasphemous thoughts" of the speaker against God.

In God in the Darkness: Mysticism and Paradox in the Poetry of George Herbert and Henry Vaughan, Elizabeth Anne Acker points out that "The Collar", along with Herbert's poem "Affliction", shouldn't be regarded as poems that represents "The Temple" as a whole, or as a book about doubt and the loss of faith and questioning, but as a moment that is temporary. Acker points out that Herbert shares these types of poems in order to share the complexity of being a servant and child of God in a place where people act on their own actions, instead of acknowledging rules of God.

In George Herbert: His Religion and Art, Joseph Summers argues that the formal disorder in the poem's structure portrays the speaker's internal conflict. Summers also notes that the speaker's resistance relents only the voice the speaker calls "My Lord" enters the poem.

Barbara Leah Harman explains in The Fiction of Coherence that "The Collar" expresses a conflict between following one's own will and following the will of God. She also points out the boundary between internal and external speech and how this interesting line introduces the idea of the speaker making an appearance both by physical actions and internal thought.

Elizabeth Anne Acker also points out that the poet never truly needs to know the purpose of why he was being afflicted or going through a trial of doubt and a desire to live one's own life. She explains as long as the person who is suffering is surrounded by other people who believe in God and understand he suffering, there is no reason to truly know everything. Acker also points out "The Collar" doesn't define Herbert.

In "Body Vs. Soul in George Herbert's 'The Collar'", Larry S. Champion discusses the poem's surprising ending, and describes the duality Herbert creates between the physical body and spirituality.

In "Me thoughts I Heard One Calling, Child!: Herbert's 'The Collar'", John R. Roberts comments on the poem's religious focus, discussing how the title functions on a symbolic level.

"Herbert's 'The Collar'", by Barbara Harman and David Leigh, discusses the double layers of the poem: both the reflective lens of obedience, and the immediacy of the speaker's rage and desperation.
