= The Altar (poem) =

Poem by George Herbert

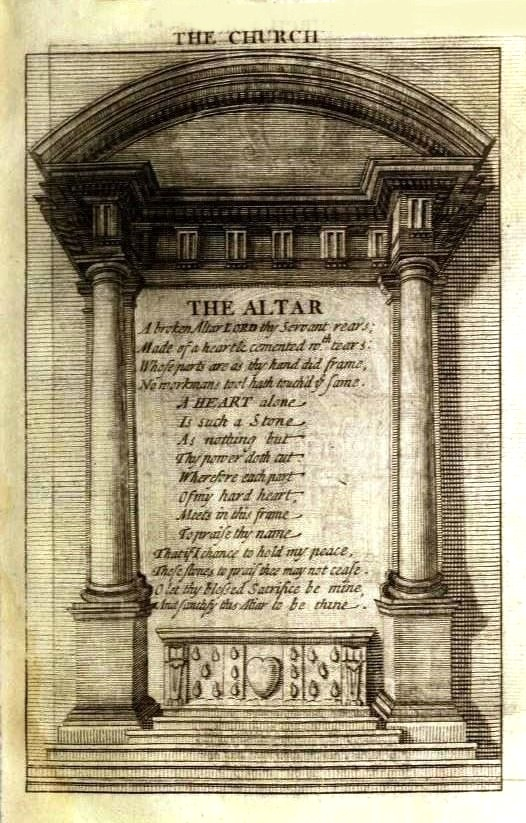
The poem in a Baroque architectural frame from the 1670 edition of George Herbert's The Temple

"The Altar" is a shaped poem by the Welsh-born poet and Anglican priest George Herbert, first published in his posthumous collection The Temple (1633). The poem is founded on a Baroque metaphor with a long history of prior use of coalescing verbal and visual image. The popularity of the collection in which it appeared is attested by eleven editions during the 17th century and a musical setting of this particular poem in 1671.

== Publication and shape ==
The Baroque aesthetic of "The Altar" is both visual and devotional. In the case of the first, its typographical form joins the long line of poems in the shape of an altar since Classical times. In fact, this was the second poem written by Herbert on the subject. The other was in Greek and had no formal resemblance to the later poem written in English.

The poem in English is founded on the poetic conceit that the altar has been fashioned from the author's stony heart by the power of Christ and, being so reared, now binds both the poet and his Lord in a lasting relationship. The balanced construction of its sixteen lines rhymed in couplets emphasizes the shape of this altar. It begins with two lines of ten syllables underlain by two of eight syllables. Below that are eight lines of just four syllables each, balanced on a reversed order of longer lines where those of eight syllables now rest on those of ten. Visually this gives a supported platform resting on a narrow pedestal with steps at its foot, as it is traditionally laid out on the printed page.

"The Altar" opens “The Church” section of Herbert’s poems, following immediately after a liminal "Church Porch" section and then proceeding to allied themes of sacrifice and thanksgiving. Though Herbert's collected poems were not published until 1633, it has been argued that this poem was originally written in 1617 at a time when the communion tables that had replaced the former stone structures in reformed English churches were beginning to be succeeded by stone altars once again.

The manuscript of The Temple was bequeathed to Nicholas Ferrar after the poet's death and was published from Cambridge in 1633. In his introduction to the work, Ferrar assured readers that the book came to them as he had received it, "without addition either of support or ornament", although that statement has since been questioned. So far as the poem "The Altar" is concerned, capitalization of the whole words ALTAR and HEART at the start, and of SACRIFICE and ALTAR at the end, does not correspond to how they are written in either of the now surviving manuscripts. Later editions also make the poem's shaped intention clearer in a number of different ways. In the book's 5th edition (1638) an outline was drawn around the poem to emphasize the way in which the layout of the lines corresponds to the shape of an altar, and more variations were introduced once publication of The Temple shifted to London.

In the Cambridge editions, the positioning of "The Altar" in the book emphasizes the beginning of The Church section, appearing on the left-hand page opposite the opening of the related "The Sacrifice". By the London 8th edition of 1670, however, the page's left-hand side is devoted to the poem "Superliminare" and appears at the foot of a Baroque-style doorway, a design which fills most of the page, illustrating the title's meaning of 'on the threshold'. "The Altar" is now on the right-hand page, framed by a Baroque archway over a substantial stone altar with steps leading up to it at its foot. The word Altar only appears capitalized in the title but not elsewhere; in the poem itself the word LORD in the first line is given reverential capitalization but otherwise only the word HEART in the fifth line is capitalized. By the 10th edition of 1674 the text of the poem is uncomfortably constricted within an elaborate archway and has the word heart alone spelt in capitals in the fifth line. It has been argued that these later changes in the poem's presentation reflect ecclesiastical attitudes in the re-established Anglican church after the Stuart Restoration - and even an attempt to re-evaluate the significance of poet's ministry.

== The poetic image ==
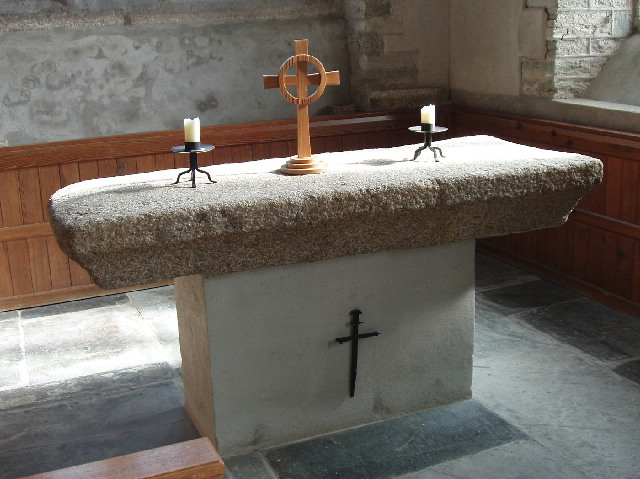
An ancient English altar stone

Scriptural and liturgical allusions contribute to the phrasing of the poem's imagery. The altar’s fabric is reared of stone that “no workman’s tool hath touched”, which is in line with the divine commandment to the Jews after their exodus from Egypt that "if thou wilt make me an altar of stone, thou shalt not build it of hewn stone: for if thou lift up thy tool upon it, thou hast polluted it." In addition, the heart of stone that contributes to its building is referred to in the prophetical book of Ezekiel, where it is promised to God's people that "I will take the stony heart out of their flesh and will give them an heart of flesh: that they may walk in my statutes and keep mine ordinances".

The vocal stones in the lines that follow are mentioned in the account of the triumphal entry of Jesus into Jerusalem; when the acclamations of his disciples were rebuked, he replied that "If these should hold their peace, the stones would immediately cry out". In reality, this entry into Jerusalem was the prelude to the crucifixion of Jesus, a self-sacrifice in which Herbert asks to share. He does this both as an ordained priest and on behalf of his readers, in line with the wording of the communion service in the 1559 Book of Common Prayer: "We offer and presente unto thee, O Lord, our selves, our soules and bodies, to be a reasonable, holy, and lively sacrifice." The altar at which he pays his devotions, therefore, is a fabrication not solely of stone but also of Holy writ.

The meaning of the poem is supplemented by the illustration in the eighth edition of The Temple (above). The words are framed in a columned Baroque archway, at the foot of which is the altar with steps leading up to it. The altar is decorated with a heart at its centre, with on either side the tears that the poet affirms have bound it together again ("cemented") after it was broken. Built into this idea is an allusion to Psalm 51:17: "The sacrifices of God are a broken spirit; a broken and a contrite heart", in acknowledgement of the personal sin for which Christ gave himself as a propitiatory sacrifice. Conceptually, too, the eight tears on either side of the heart carved at the altar's centre are the rhymed lines that cement the poem together, with the shorter lines at its heart. Image and word are brought together by this emblematic means.

The poem is ostensibly a dialogue with Christ, who is addressed by the poet at its very beginning. There is, however, a deliberate ambiguity to what is taking place. On one level it is the prayer of an individual. But in that Herbert speaks as a priest before an altar, specifically named as such rather than the "table" mentioned in The Book of Common Prayer, there is also a more sacramental dimension to the poem. The poet keeps the wording unspecific so that interpretation of the "sacrifice" taking place may be understood eucharistically by those of a High Church tendency, or at the interpersonal level of Puritan understanding.

Evidence of such an intention is found in the emendation to the poem's penultimate line in an earlier manuscript. There the wording "onely sacrifice" has been changed to "blesséd" so as to avoid the extreme Protestant emphasis that Christ's sacrifice was once for all and so allow others the traditional understanding that the divine sacrifice is being re-enacted on the altar during the communion service. In light of this, therefore, just as the poem is a skilful wedding of scriptural and visual image, so it also covertly combines opposite points of view at the doctrinal level.

== Musical settings ==
Settings of the poem have been infrequent. A 17th century arrangement has been identified as by John Playford as part of his Psalms and Hymns in Solemn Musick of Foure Parts On the Common Tunes to the Psalms in Meter: used in Parish Churches. Also Six Hymns for One Voyce to the Organ (1671). In her study of it, Louise Schleiner comments on how the composer endeavoured to express its form through the music (1671).

Others followed only centuries later and on different continents. In Australia there was a 1989 a capella choral setting by Becky Llewellyn. An American a capella setting by Nicholas White followed a decade later in 1999, and one by Hal H. Hopson in 2009. In his 2011 setting for accompanied choir, Roland E. Martin notes that ""The Altar" opens with a choral fugue that symbolizes the building of the altar as the voices are stacked one on top of the other".
