= Concrete poetry =

Movement in art and poetry involving the visual arrangement of language

"Constantinople", a 'ferro-concrete poem' from Tango with Cows by the Russian Futurist Vasily Kamensky, 1914

Concrete poetry is an arrangement of linguistic elements in which the typographical effect is more important in conveying meaning than verbal significance. It is sometimes referred to as visual poetry, a term that has now developed a distinct meaning of its own. Concrete poetry relates more to the visual than to the verbal arts although there is a considerable overlap in the kind of product to which it refers. Historically, however, concrete poetry has developed from a long tradition of shaped or patterned poems in which the words are arranged in such a way as to depict their subject.

== Development ==
Though the term 'concrete poetry' is modern, the idea of using letter arrangements to enhance the meaning of a poem is old. Such shaped poetry was popular in Greek Alexandria during the 3rd and 2nd centuries BCE, although only the handful which were collected together in the Greek Anthology now survive. Examples include poems by Simmias of Rhodes in the shape of an egg, wings and a hatchet, as well as Theocritus' pan-pipes.

The post-Classical revival of shaped poetry seems to begin with the Gerechtigkeitsspirale (spiral of justice), a relief carving of a poem at the pilgrimage church of St. Valentin, Kiedrich. The text is carved in the form of a spiral on the front of one of the church pews and created in 1510 by master carpenter Erhart Falckener. But the heyday of the revival of shaped poetry came in the Baroque period when poets, in the words of Jeremy Adler, "did away with the more-or-less arbitrary appearance of the text, turned the incidental fact of writing into an essential facet of composition, and thereby…created a union of poetry with the visual arts". There were already precedents for this in Micrography, a technique for creating visual images used by Hebrew artists, which involves organizing small arrangements of Biblical texts such that they form images which illustrate the subject of the text. Micrography allowed the creation of images of natural objects by Jews without directly breaking the prohibition of creating "graven images" that might be interpreted as idolatry. The technique is now used by both religious and secular artists and is similar to the use of Arabic texts in Islamic calligraphy.

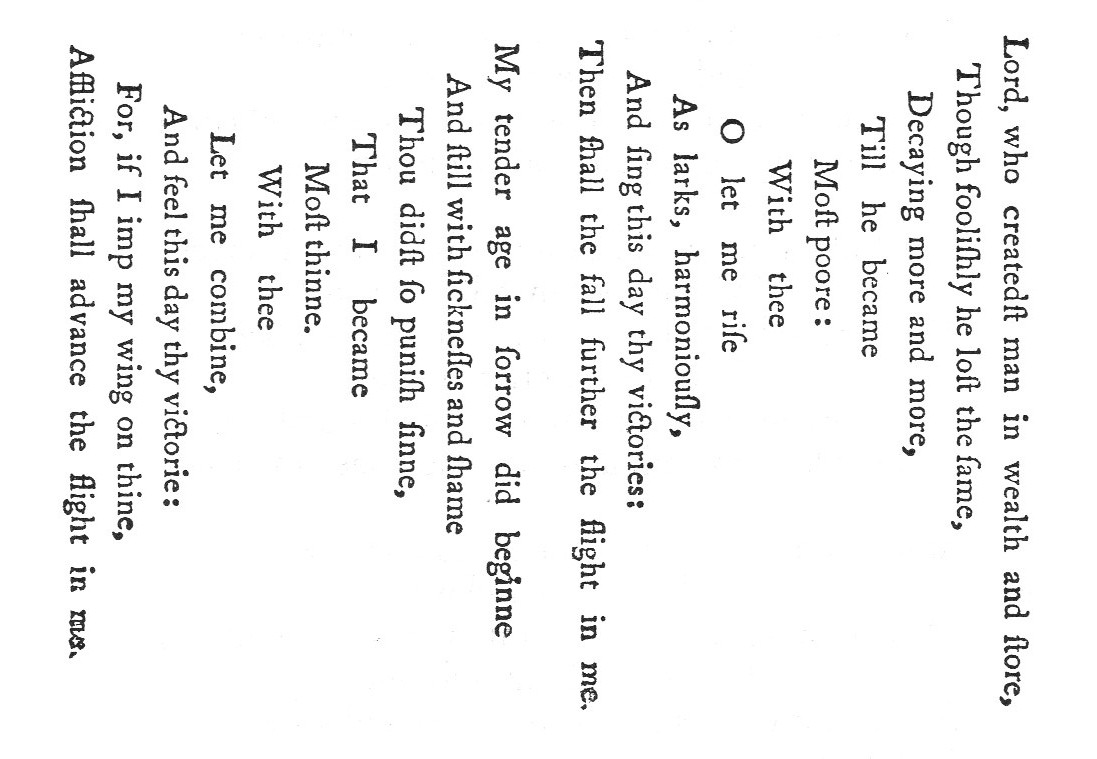
George Herbert's "Easter Wings" (1633), printed sideways on facing pages so that the lines would call to mind angels flying with outstretched wings

Early religious examples of shaped poems in English include "Easter Wings" and "The Altar" in George Herbert's The Temple (1633) and Robert Herrick's "This crosstree here", which is set in the shape of a cross, from his Noble Numbers (1647). Secular examples include poems on the subject of drinking in the shape of wine flagons by Rabelais and Charles-François Panard (1750), supplemented by the elaborate goblet of Quirinus Moscherosch (1660), the playful "A Toast" (Zdravljica, 1844) by France Prešeren, with stanzas in the shape of wine-glasses, and "The Mouse's Tale", a shaped poem published in 1865 by Lewis Carroll.

The approach reappeared at the start of the 20th century, initially in the Calligrammes (1918) of Guillaume Apollinaire, with poems in the shape of a necktie, a fountain, and raindrops running down a window, among other examples. In that era also there were typographical experiments by members of avant-garde movements such as Futurism, Dada, and Surrealism in which layout moved from an auxiliary expression of meaning to artistic primacy. Thus the significance of the sound poetry in Marinetti's Zang Tumb Tumb (1912) is expressed through pictorial means. Similarly in Germany, Raoul Hausmann claimed that the typographic style of his "Phonemes" allowed the reader to recognize what sound was intended. In Russia the Futurist poet Vasily Kamensky went so far as to term the typography of his Tango with Cows, published in 1914, "ferro-concrete poems" (zhelezobetonnye poemy), long before the name became current elsewhere.

A further move away from overt meaning occurred where "poems" were simplified to a simple arrangement of the letters of the alphabet. Louis Aragon, for example, exhibited the sequence from A to Z in his work Suicide (1926), while Kurt Schwitters' ZA (elementary) has the alphabet in reverse, and the Catalan writer Josep Maria Junoy (1885–1955) placed just the letters Z and A at the top and bottom of the page in his work Ars Poetica.

== Post-war concrete poetry ==
During the early 1950s, two Brazilian artistic groups producing abstract and impersonal work were joined by poets linked to the São Paulo magazine Noigandres who began to treat language in an equally abstract way. When they exhibited in the National Exhibition of Concrete Art (1956/57), their work was termed "concrete poetry". The poets included Augusto de Campos, Haroldo de Campos and Décio Pignatari, who were joined in the exhibition by Ferreira Gullar, Ronaldo Azeredo and Wlademir Dias Pino from Rio de Janeiro. In 1958, a Brazilian concrete poetry manifesto was published and an anthology in 1962.

Dom Sylvester Houédard claimed that it was the 1962 publication in The Times Literary Supplement of a letter from the Portuguese E.M. de Melo e Castro that awakened British writers such as himself, Ian Hamilton Finlay and Edwin Morgan to the possibilities of Concrete Poetry. However, there were by this time other European writers producing similar work. In 1954 the Swedish poet and visual artist Öyvind Fahlström had published the manifesto Hätila Ragulpr på Fåtskliaben. Similarly in Germany Eugen Gomringer published his manifesto vom vers zur konstellation (from line to constellation), in which he declared that a poem should be "a reality in itself" rather than a statement about reality, and "as easily understood as signs in airports and traffic signs". The difficulty in defining such a style is admitted by Houédard's statement that "a printed concrete poem is ambiguously both typographic-poetry and poetic-typography".

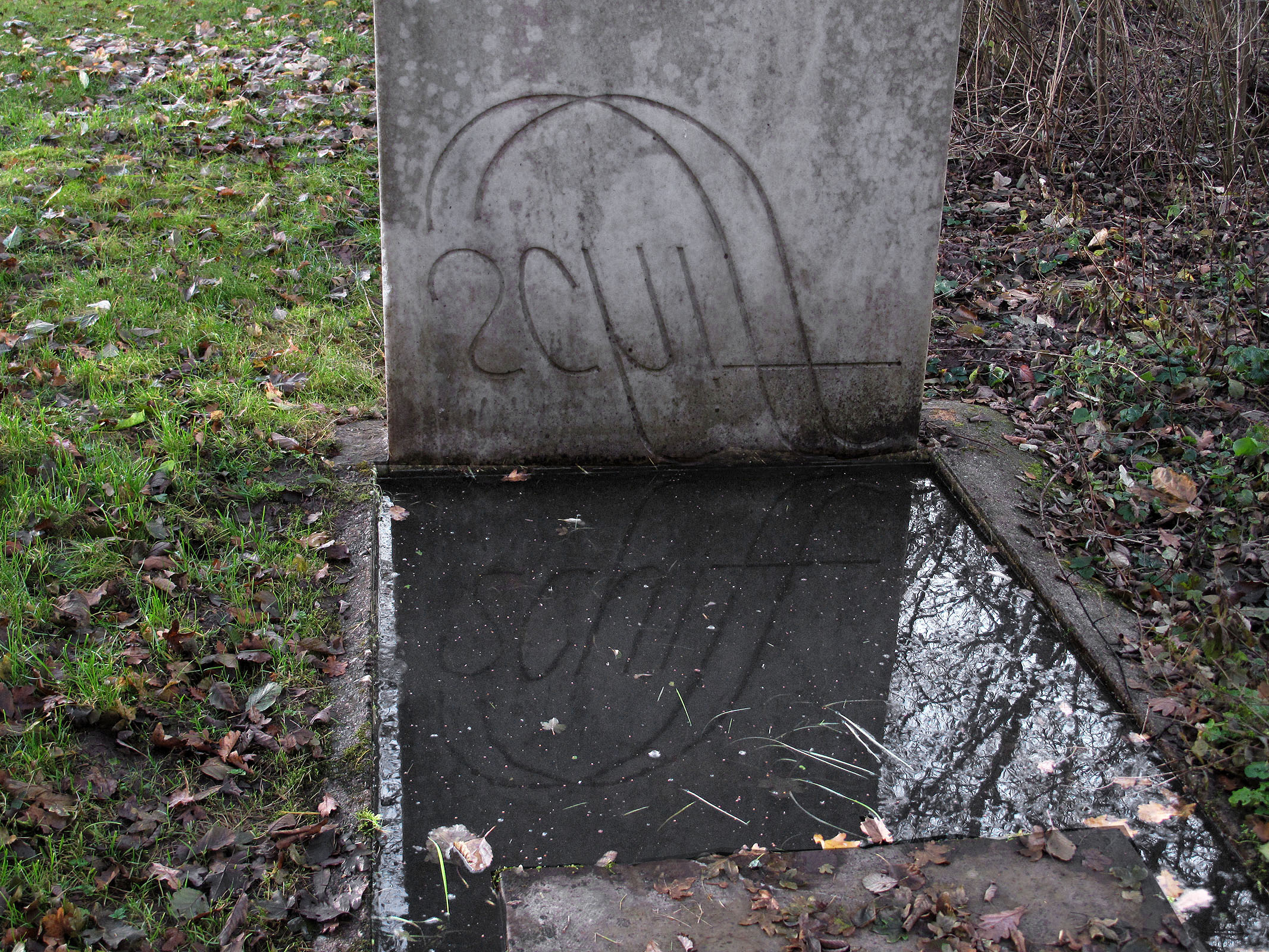
Ian Hamilton Finlay sculpture in Stuttgart, 1975; the word schiff (ship) is carved in reverse and can only be decoded when it floats reflected on water.

Another difficulty of definition is caused by the way such works cross artistic boundaries into the areas of music and sculpture, or can alternatively be defined as sound poetry, visual poetry, found poetry and typewriter art. Henri Chopin's work was related to his musical treatment of the word. Kenelm Cox (1927–68) was a kinetic artist "interested in the linear, serial aspects of visual experience but particularly in the process of change," whose revolving machines transcended the static page in being able to express this. Ian Hamilton Finlay's concrete poetry began on the page but then moved increasingly towards three dimensional figuration and afterwards to site-specific art in the creation of his sculpture garden at Little Sparta. The Italian Maurizio Nannucci's Dattilogrammmi experiments (1964/1965) were also transitional, preluding his move into light art.

Bob Cobbing, who was also a sound poet, had been experimenting with typewriter and duplicator since 1942. Of its possibilities in suggesting the physical dimension of the auditory process, he declared that "One can get the measure of a poem with the typewriter's accurate left/right & up & down movements; but superimposition by means of stencil and duplicator enable one to dance to this measure." Houédard's entirely different work was also produced principally on the typewriter but approximates more to painterly and sculptural procedures. So too does that of the American Minimalist artist Carl Andre, beginning from about 1958 and in parallel with his changing artistic procedures. And in Italy Adriano Spatola (1941–1988) developed the artistic fragmentation of language using various visual techniques in his Zeroglifico (1965/6).

Edwin Morgan's experiments with concrete poetry covered several other aspects of it, including elements of found poetry 'discovered' by misreading and isolating elements from printed sources. "Most people have probably had the experience of scanning a newspaper page quickly and taking a message from it quite different from the intended one. I began looking deliberately for such hidden messages…preferably with the visual or typographical element part of the point." Another aspect of the search for unintended concordances of meaning emerges in A Humument, the lifework of the visual artist Tom Phillips, who uses painterly and decorative procedures to isolate them on the page.

Despite such blurring of artistic boundaries, concrete poetry can be viewed as taking its place in a predominantly visual tradition stretching over more than two millennia that seeks to draw attention to the word in the space of the page, and to the spaces between words, as an aid to emphasising their significance. In recent years, this approach has led Mario Petrucci to suggest that the "extreme example" of concrete poetry can be seen as nested within the larger concept of Spatial Form. Starting from the observation that poetry can usually be told from prose simply by looking at it, this reading of Spatial Form encompasses the many aspects of subtle visual significance that are held, for instance, by typeface or in the textures of repeated letters, as well as the more overt visual signals generated by the poem's layout.

== See also ==
- ASCII Art – Computer art form using text characters
- Calligram – Written work arranged in a way that creates a visual image
- Carmen figuratum – Poetic form
- List of concrete and visual poets
- Musique concrete – Form of electroacoustic music
- Lyco art – Canadian painter and poet (born 1936)
- Something Else Press – Former American intermedia publisher
- Visual poetry – Poetry style that incorporates graphic and visual design elements

== Bibliography ==
- Adler, Jeremy (1982). "Technopaignia, Carmina Figurata and Bilder-Reime. Seventeenth¬Century Figured Poetry in Historical Context". Comparative Criticism (IV): 107–147.
- Adler, Jeremy; Ernst, Ulrich (1990). Text als Figur. Visuelle Poesie von der Antike bis zur Moderne [Text as Character. Visual Poetry from Antiquity to Modern Times] (in German) (Third ed.). Herzog August Bibliothek, Wolfenbüttel; Weinheim: Acta Humaniora / VCH.
- Bäckström, Per (2012). "Words as things. Concrete Poetry in Scandinavia" (PDF). Cahiers de la Nouvelle Europe: Transfers, Appropriations and Functions of Avant-Garde in Central and Northern Europe, 1909–1989. Paris: L'Harmattan.
- Cobbing, Bob, ed. (1974). Gloup and Woup. Gillingham: Arc Publications. ISBN 9780902771277.
- Dencker, Klaus Peter (2000). "From Concrete to Visual poetry". Light & Dust Anthology of Poetry. Translated by Harry Polkinhorn. Kaldron On-line.
- Finch, Peter, ed. (1972). Typewriter Poems. Cardiff: Something Else Press/Second Aeon Publications.
- Higgins, Dick (1987). Pattern Poetry: Guide to an Unknown Literature. State University of New York Press. ISBN 978-0887064142.
- McLoughlin, Nigel, ed. (2017). The Portable Poetry Workshop. Vol. I:12, Spatial Form. Palgrave.; print ISBN 978-1-137-60703-4, electronic ISBN 978-1-137-60596-2
- Nannucci, Maurizio (1970). Anthology of concrete and visual poetry. Florence.
- Sharkey, John, ed. (1971). Mindplay, an Anthology of British Concrete Poetry. London: Lorrimer Publishing Limited.
