= Johann Leonhard Frisch =

German linguist, entomologist and ornithologist

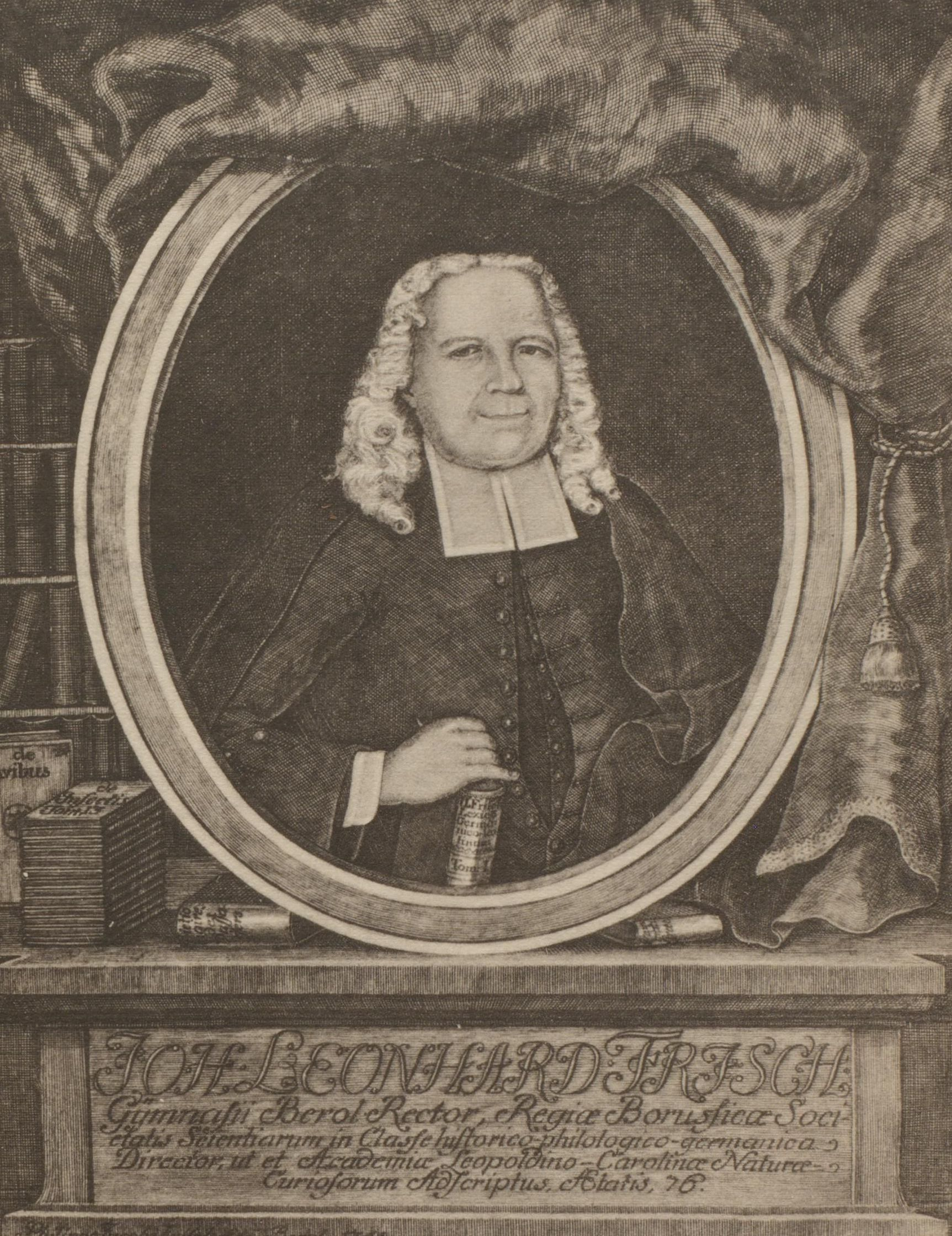
Johann Leonhard Frisch

Johann Leonhard Frisch (19 March 1666 – 21 March 1743) was a German linguist, entomologist and ornithologist.
