= William Bosworth =

English poet

William Bosworth (died 1650?) was an English poet, known for a posthumous volume of verse from 1651.

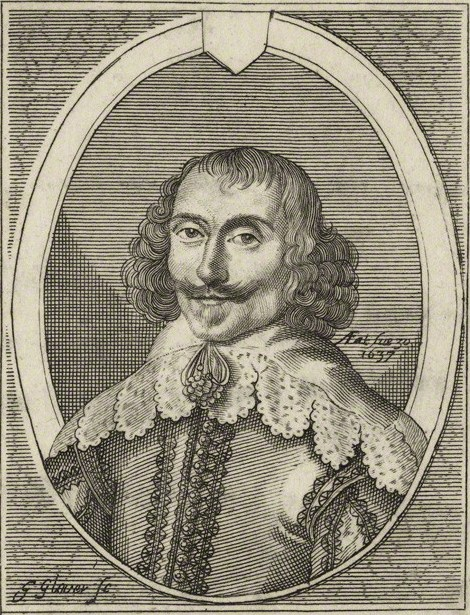
William Bosworth, engraving by George Glover, as identified in 1811 by Francis Allison.

== Life ==
He belonged to a family (whose name is sometimes spelt Boxworth) of Boxworth in Cambridgeshire. He wrote much poetry in his youth, but published nothing. He died about 1650.

== Works ==
In 1651 an admiring friend (R. C.) issued The Chast and Lost Lovers Lively shadowed in the persona of Arcadius and Sepha .... To this is added the Contestation betwixt Bacchus and Diana, and certain Sonnets of the Author to Avrora. Digested into three Poems by Will. Bosworth, Gent., London, 1651. It contained Bosworth's poetry, with a dedication to John Finch, Lord Chief Justice of the Common Pleas. Five copies of verses signed respectively L. B., F. L. (Francis Lovelace), E. G. (Edmund Gayton), S. P., and L. C., lament Bosworth's death.

The major poem of the volume is the Historie of Arcadius and Sepha in two books. It was a romance in the style of Sir Philip Sidney, and non-political, making it unusual for its period.

== Notes ==
Attribution

This article incorporates text from a publication now in the public domain: "Bosworth, William". Dictionary of National Biography. London: Smith, Elder & Co. 1885–1900.
