= Calligrammes =

1918 poetry collection by Guillaume Apollinaire

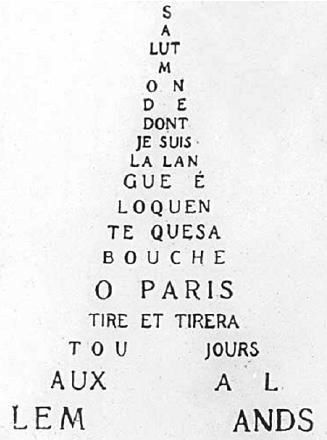
A calligram from Calligrammes

Calligrammes: Poems of Peace and War 1913–1916, is a collection of poems by Guillaume Apollinaire which was first published in 1918. Calligrammes is noted for how the typeface and spatial arrangement of the words on a page plays just as much of a role in the meaning of each poem as the words themselves – a form called a calligram. In this sense, the collection can be seen as either concrete poetry or visual poetry.

Apollinaire described his work as "an idealisation of free verse poetry and typographical precision in an era when typography is reaching a brilliant end to its career, at the dawn of the new means of reproduction that are the cinema and the phonograph".

== Gallery ==
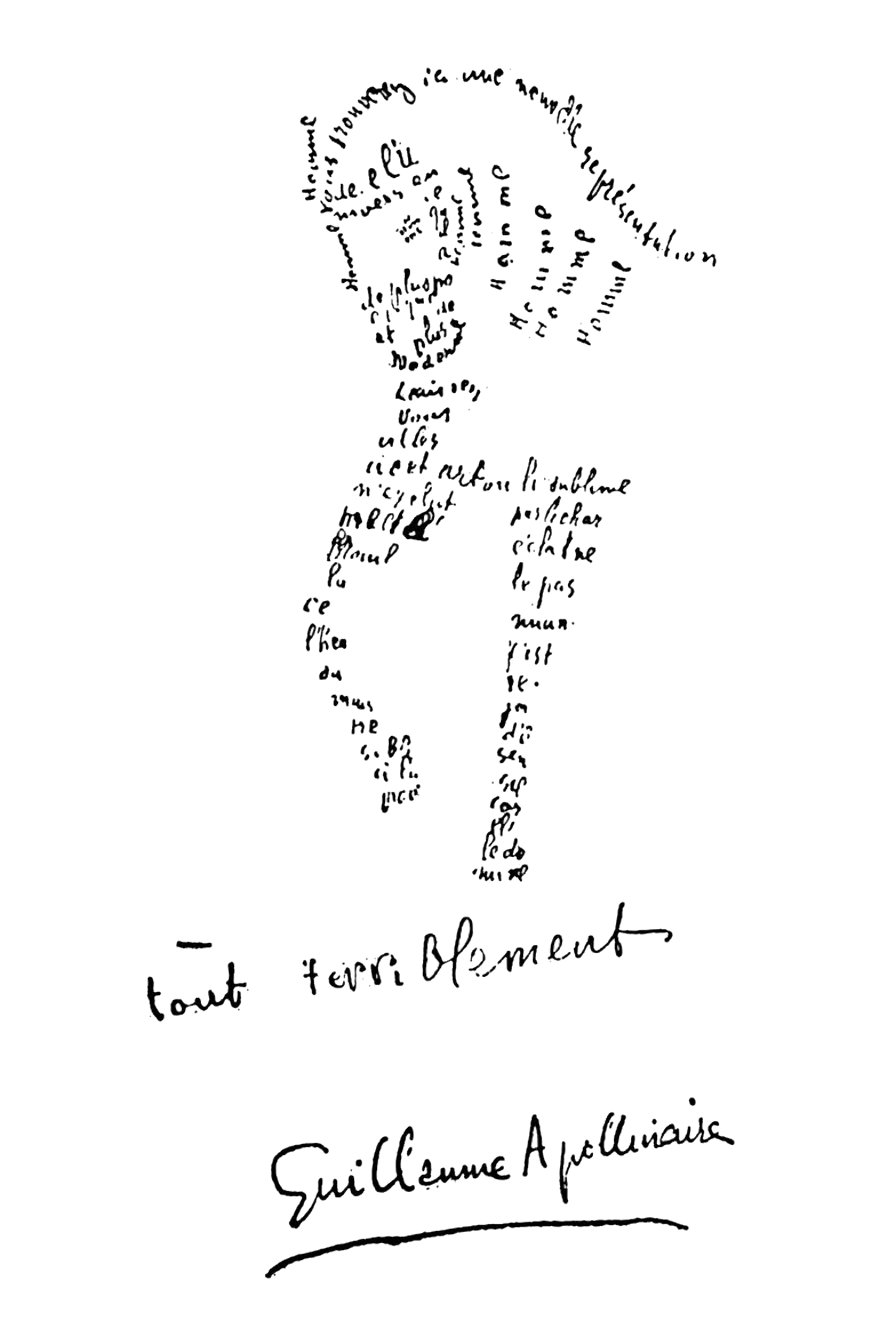
Cheval

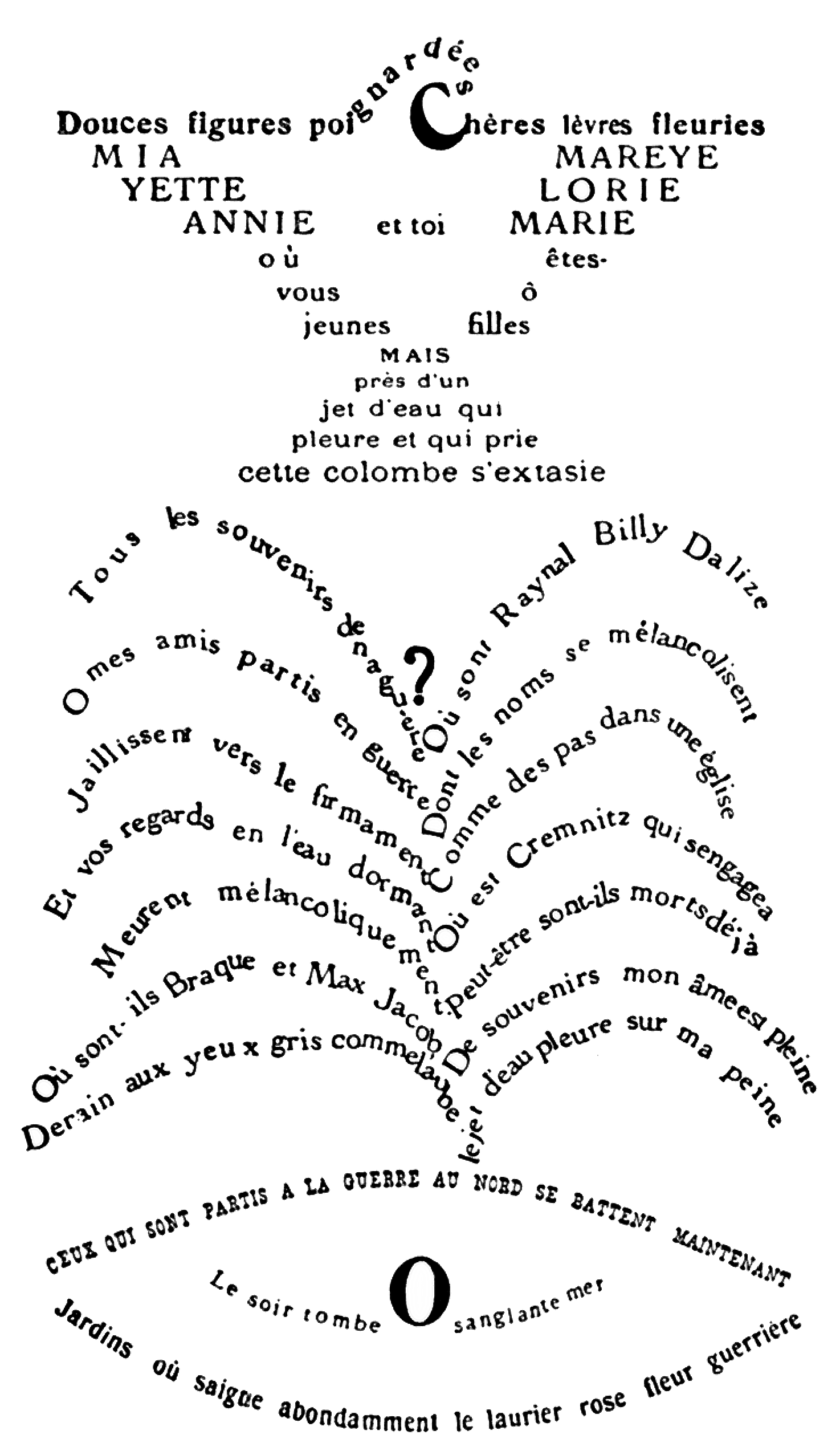
La Colombe poignardée et le Jet d’eau

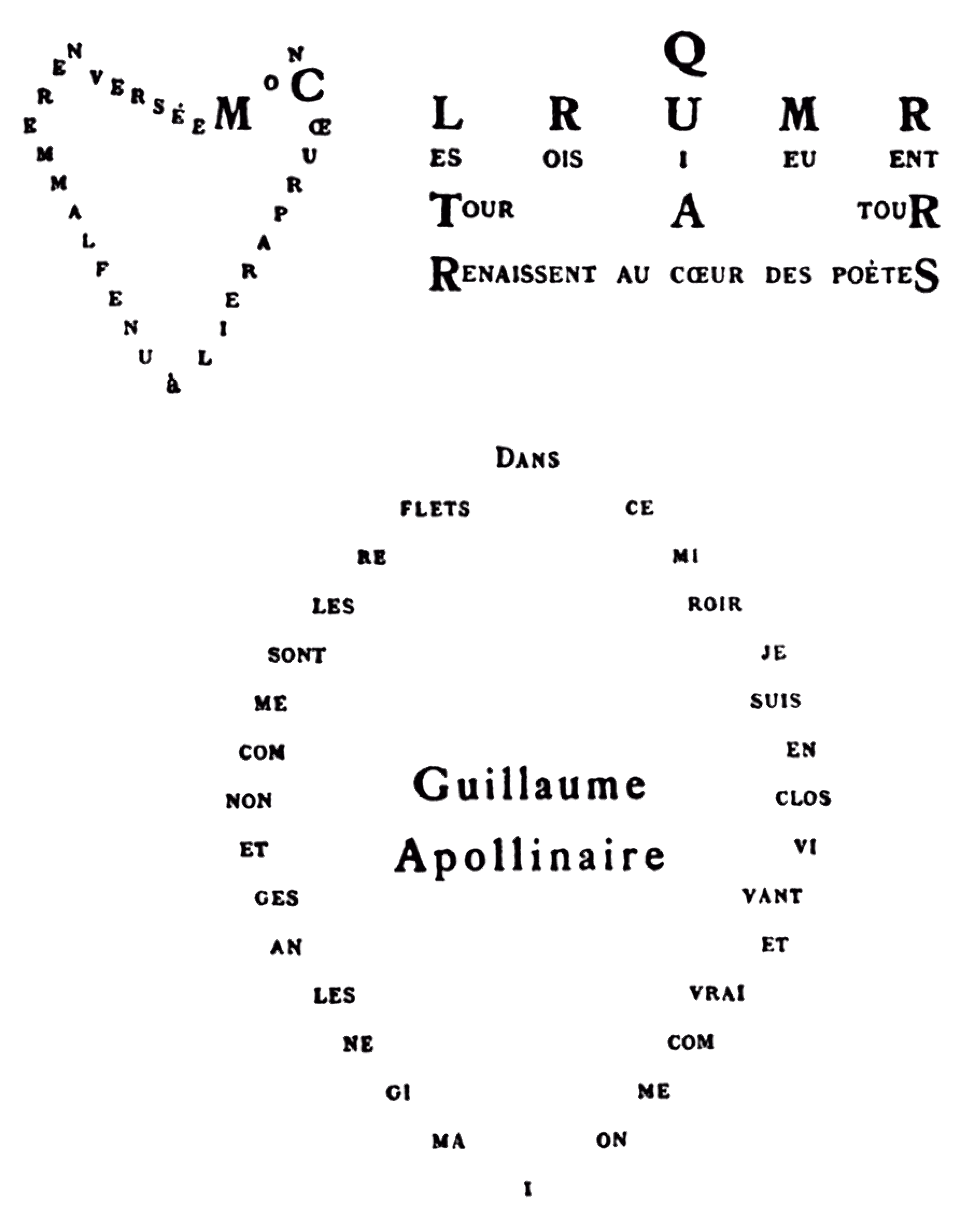
Cœur, couronne et miroir

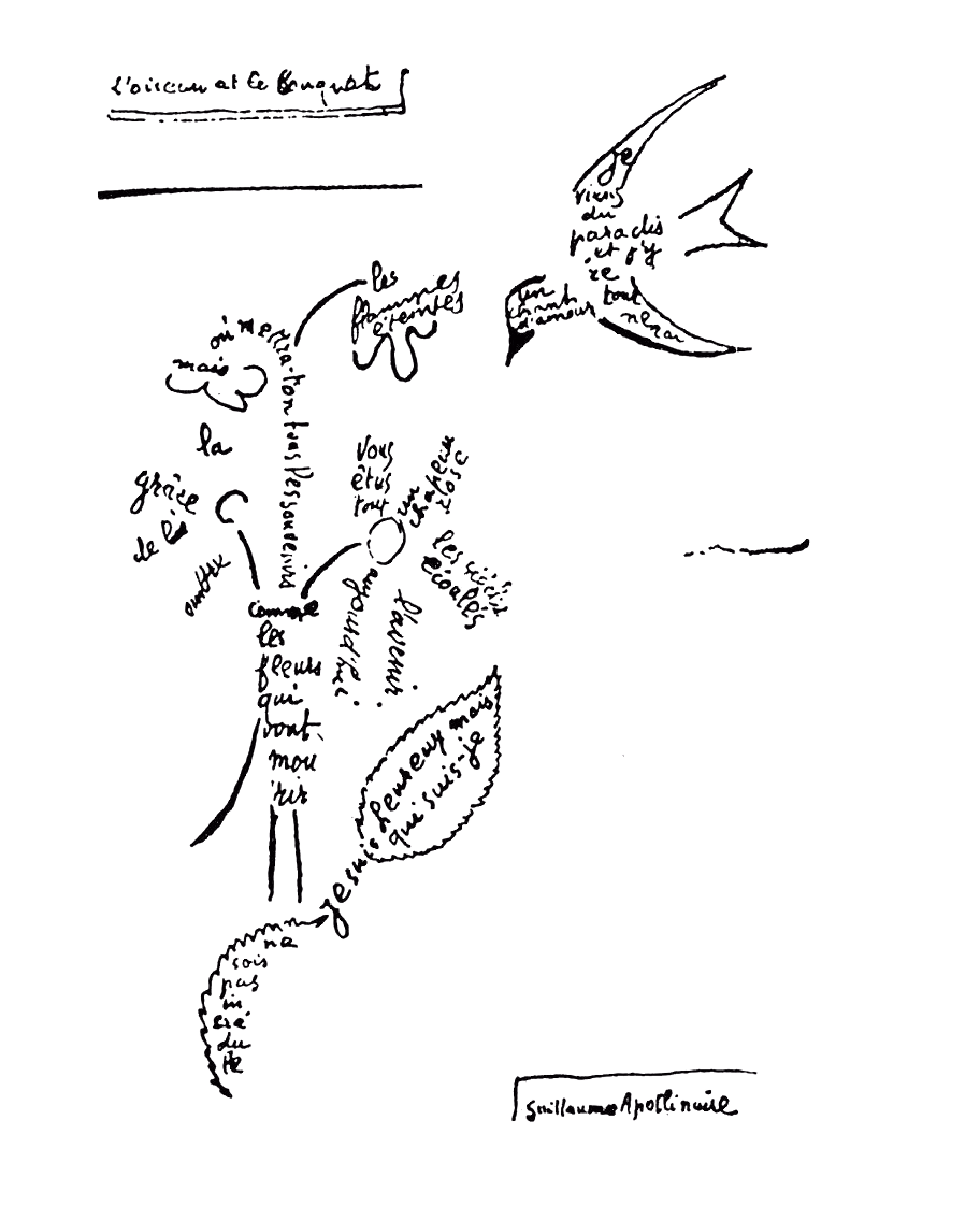
L'oiseau et le bouquet

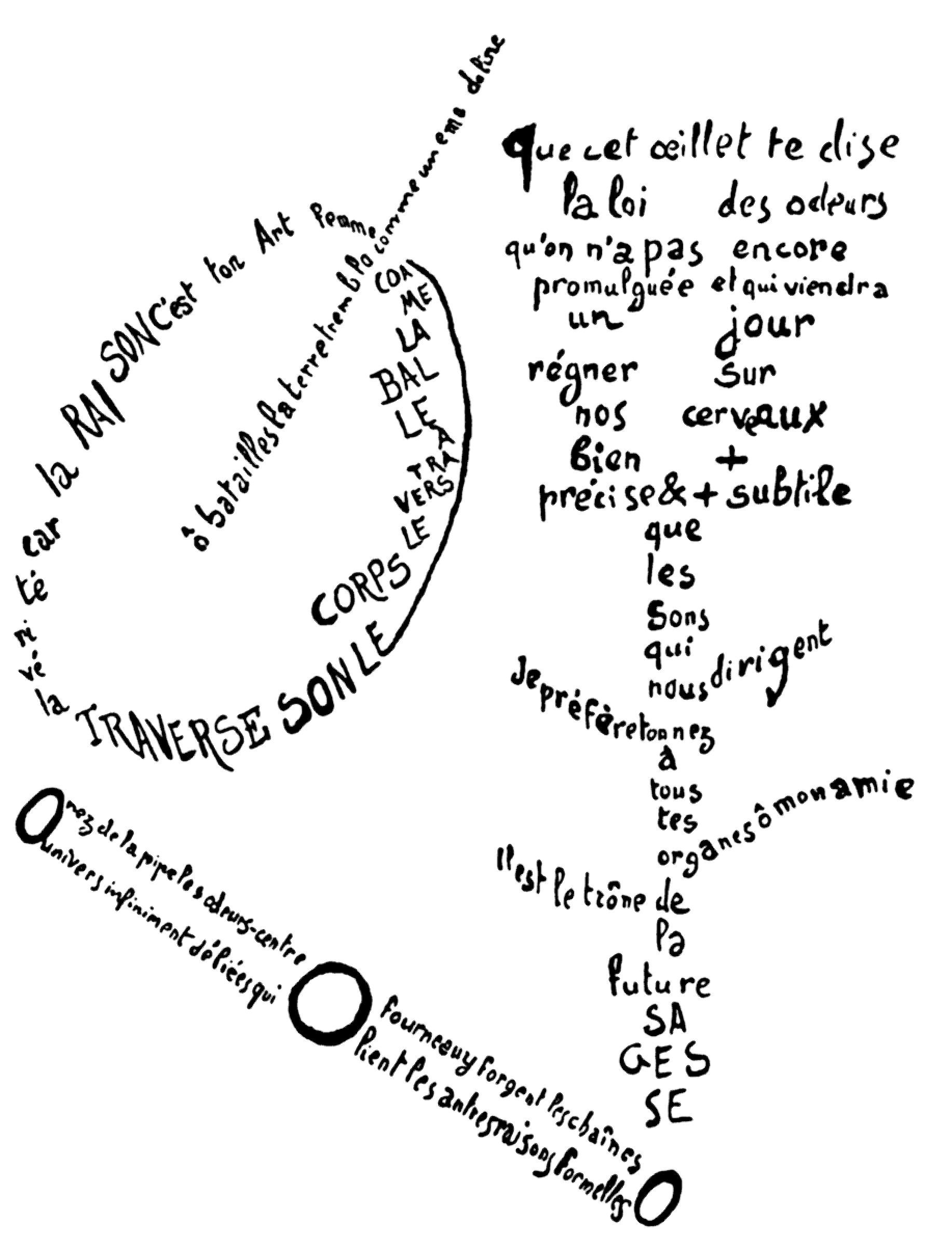
La Mandoline, l’œillet et le bambou

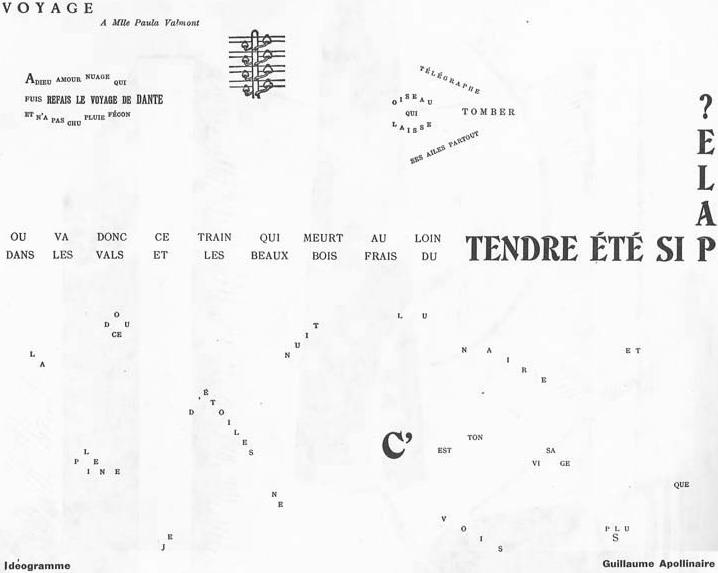
Voyage

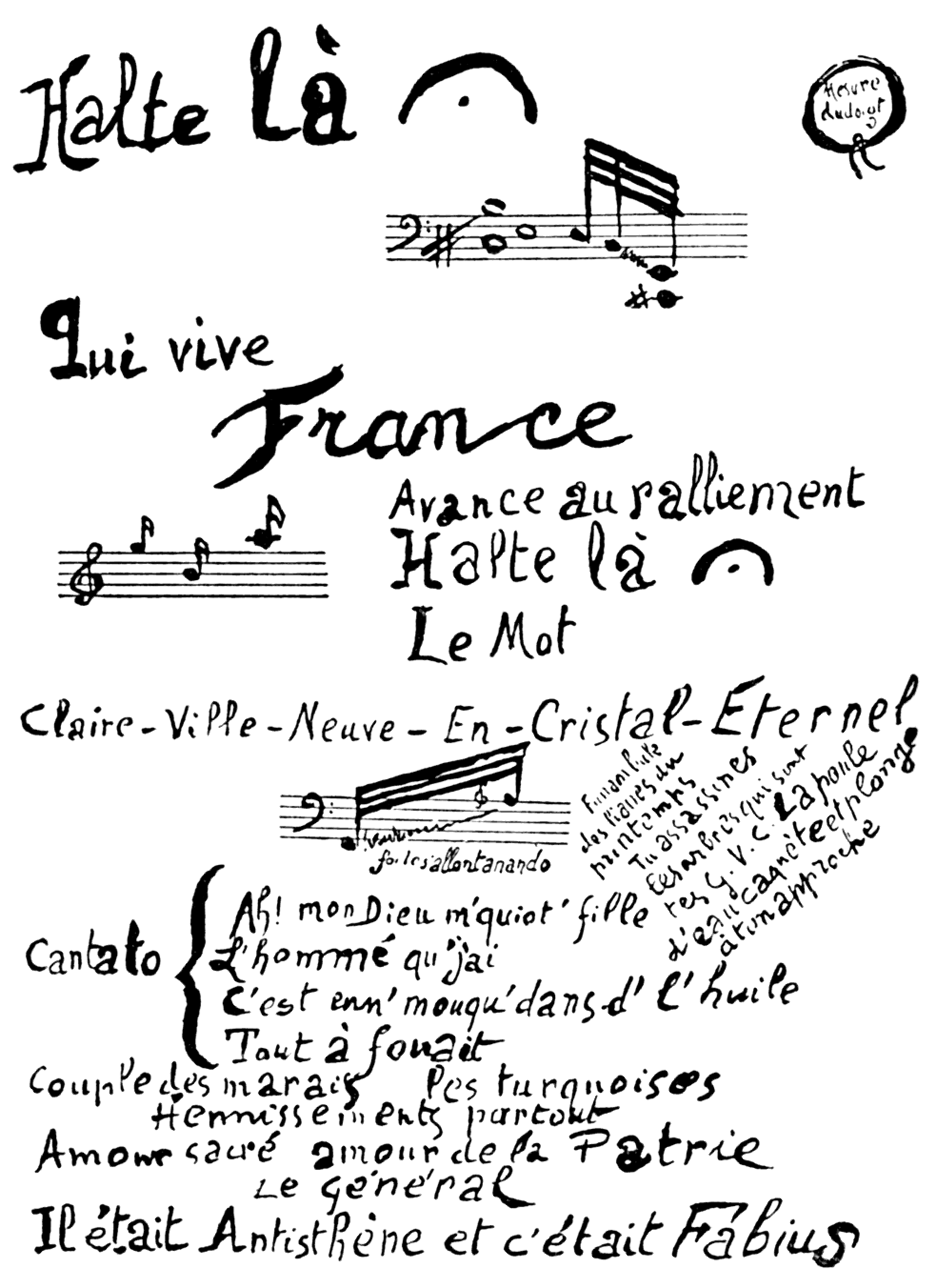
Venu de Dieuze

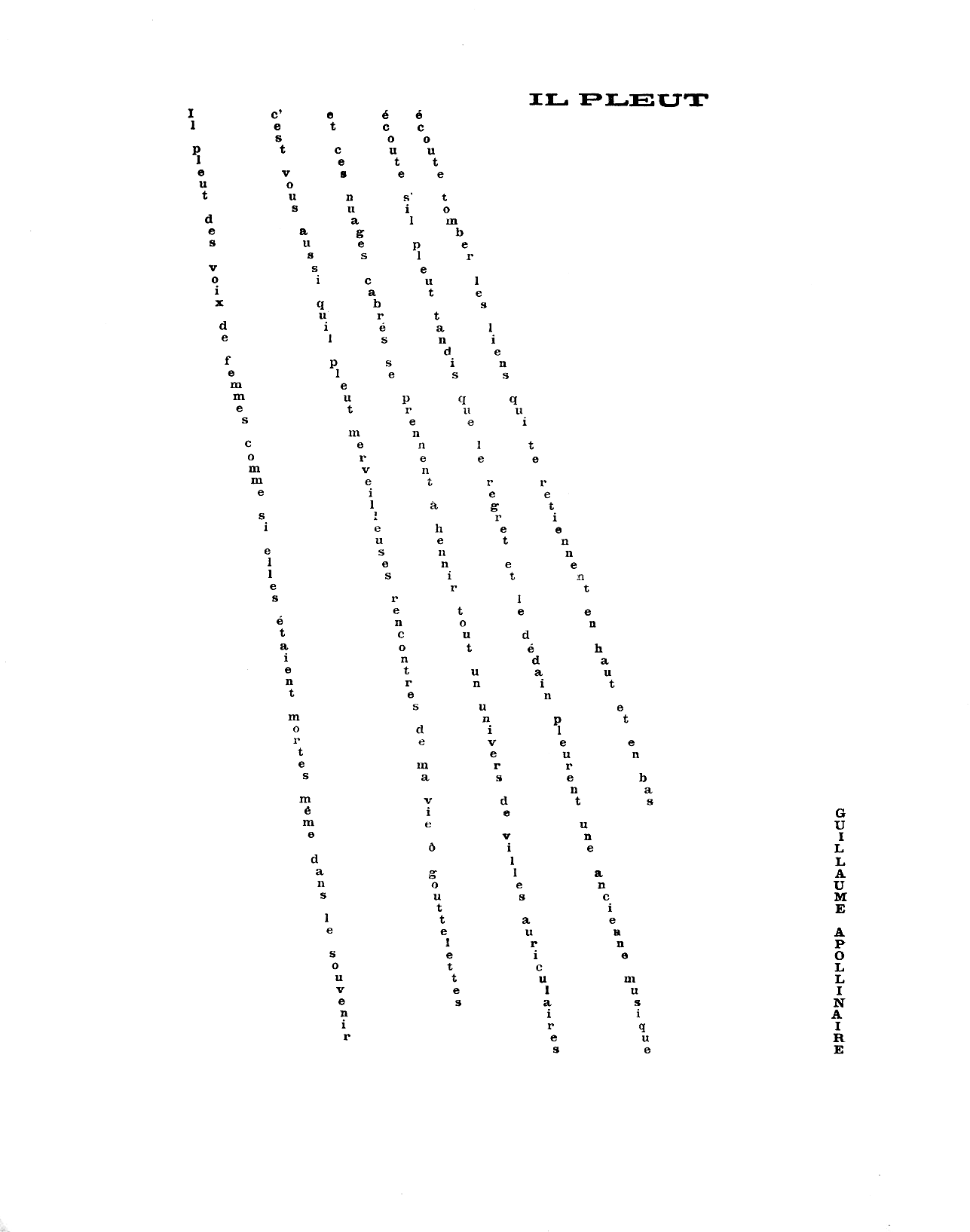
Il pleut

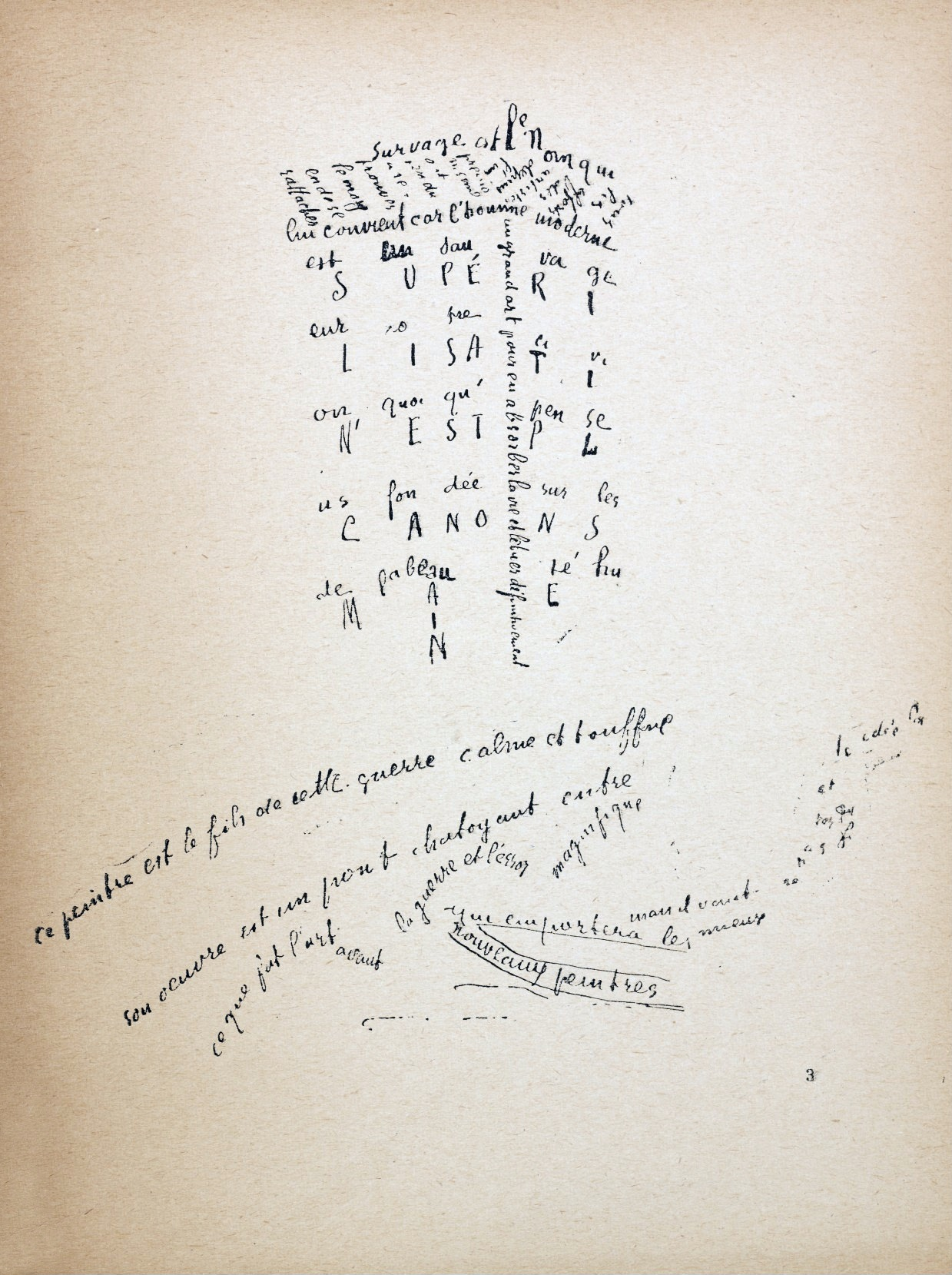
A calligram from Calligrammes

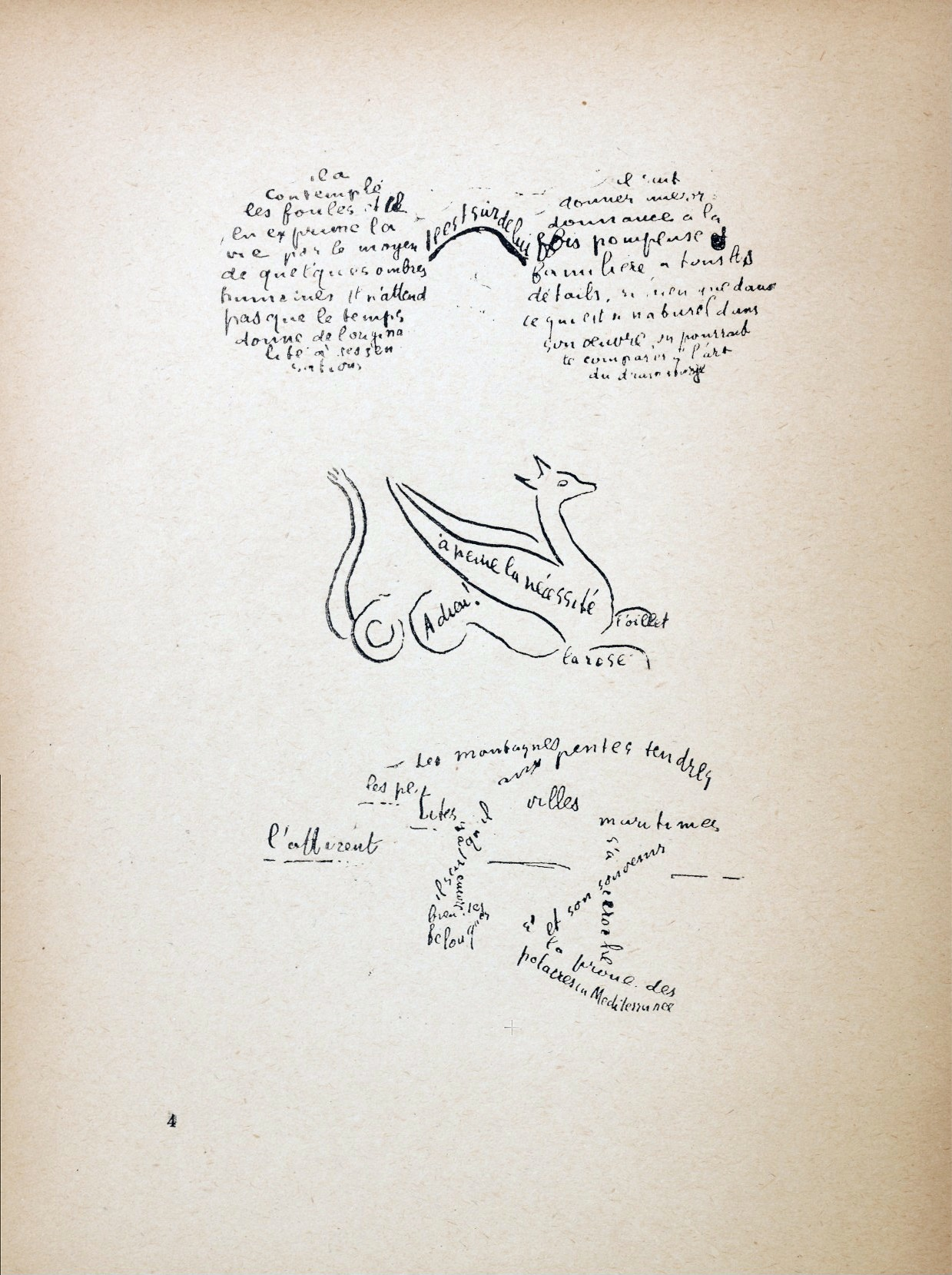
A calligram from Calligrammes
