= Harnham =

Suburb of Salisbury, England

Coordinates: 51.060°N 1.810°W

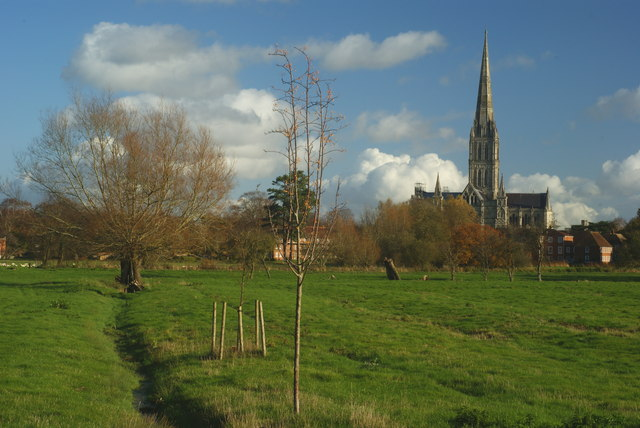
- View across the water meadows from lower Harnham

- Location within Wiltshire
- Population: 4,992 (Ward, 2011)
- OS grid reference: SU 134 290
- Civil parish: Salisbury
- Unitary authority: Wiltshire
- Ceremonial county: Wiltshire
- Region: South West
- Country: England
- Sovereign state: United Kingdom
- Post town: Salisbury
- Postcode district: SP2
- Dialling code: 01722
- Police: Wiltshire
- Fire: Dorset and Wiltshire
- Ambulance: South Western
- UK Parliament: Salisbury

Harnham is a suburb of the city of Salisbury in Wiltshire, England, centred about 0.6 miles (1 km) south of Salisbury Cathedral and across the River Avon. Harnham is split into the areas of West Harnham and East Harnham.

== History ==
=== Early history ===
The area has had human habitation since the Iron Age; a settlement is marked on Ordnance Survey maps underneath several modern houses in Harnwood Road / Old Blandford Road, a straight Roman road. (Note: A road which just one mile further south forms a Scheduled Ancient Monument, Roman Road by Knighton)

=== Middle Ages ===
Until the 19th-century formation of urban and rural districts, the area lay within the Cawdon and Cawsworth Hundred of Wiltshire.

Road access to the city was improved in 1244 by the building of Ayleswade bridge, in two sections across an island in the Avon, leading traffic from the south through Harnham instead of the older route to the west through Wilton. The old bridge survives inside an outer casing added in the 16th or 17th century.

St Nicholas Hospital, sometimes described as being in Harnham, was built earlier than the bridge, just north of it. Parts of the medieval almshouses survive, including two chapels, and the site continues to provide sheltered housing for a Christian community.

The manors of East and West Harnham were still owned by the 13th-century College of the Valley Scholars, which stood next to St Nicholas Hospital, when it was dissolved in 1542. The next year, they were sold by the Crown to Sir Michael Lister, a king's servant.

=== Post Industrial Revolution ===
In 1848, Samuel Lewis (publisher) described the settlement in a topographical dictionary based partly on 1841 census statistics:

- East Harnham, a tything, in the parish of Britford, union of Alderbury, hundred of Cawden and Cadworth, Salisbury and Amesbury, and south divisions of Wilts., 1½ mile (S. E. by S.) from the city of Salisbury; containing 411 inhabitants.
- West Harnham (St George) a parish, in the union of Alderbury, hundred of Cawden and Cadworth, Salisbury and Amesbury, and S. divisions of Wilts, 1½ mile (S. W. by W.) from Salisbury; containing 256 inhabitants. The living is annexed to the vicarage of Coombe-Bisset; the tithes were partly commuted for land and money payments under the Odstock, &c. Inclosure Act 1783 (23 Geo. 3. c. 36 Pr.); and the remainder have been commuted for a rentcharge of £50.

=== Civil parishes ===
East Harnham was anciently a tithing in the parish of Britford. It became an ecclesiastical parish in 1855 after the opening of All Saints' church. East Harnham continued to be part of Britford civil parish until 1896, when it was made a separate civil parish. In 1904 the civil parish of East Harnham was abolished. Most of its area, including the village itself, was absorbed into the borough boundaries of Salisbury; the more rural parts of the old East Harnham parish were split between neighbouring Britford and West Harnham. A Harnham civil parish briefly existed between 1904 and 1905 covering the parts of East Harnham and Britford which had been transferred into the borough of Salisbury in 1904; as an urban parish it had no parish council and was always directly administered by the city council. All the urban parishes within Salisbury were united into a single parish called New Sarum in 1905.

West Harnham was anciently a chapelry in the parish of Coombe Bissett, but was treated as a separate civil parish from an early date. The boundary with neighbouring Netherhampton to its west was the course of a Roman road. In 1927 the urban part of West Harnham was transferred into the borough of Salisbury. A residual parish of West Harnham just covering the rural parts of the old parish continued to exist until 1934 when it was abolished and absorbed into Netherhampton.

== Geography ==
Harnham is a suburb in the southwest of Salisbury and is linked to the city by road via the Ayleswade Bridge in East Harnham, originally built across the Avon in 1244, and by foot via the Town Path across the "historic and important landscape" of the Harnham Water Meadows in West Harnham.

The meadows lie between two branches of the River Nadder and extend into the outskirts of the city. They are part of an extensive irrigation system of floated water meadows, dating from the mid-seventeenth century. Now a Site of Special Scientific Interest known as East Harnham Meadows, they are still used for grazing and were voted the Best View in Britain by Country Life magazine in 2002. The meadows were made famous in John Constable's painting "Salisbury Cathedral – A View from the Water Meadow". The meadows are managed by the Harnham Water Meadows Trust, and owned by the Trust jointly with the Dean and Chapter of Salisbury Cathedral.

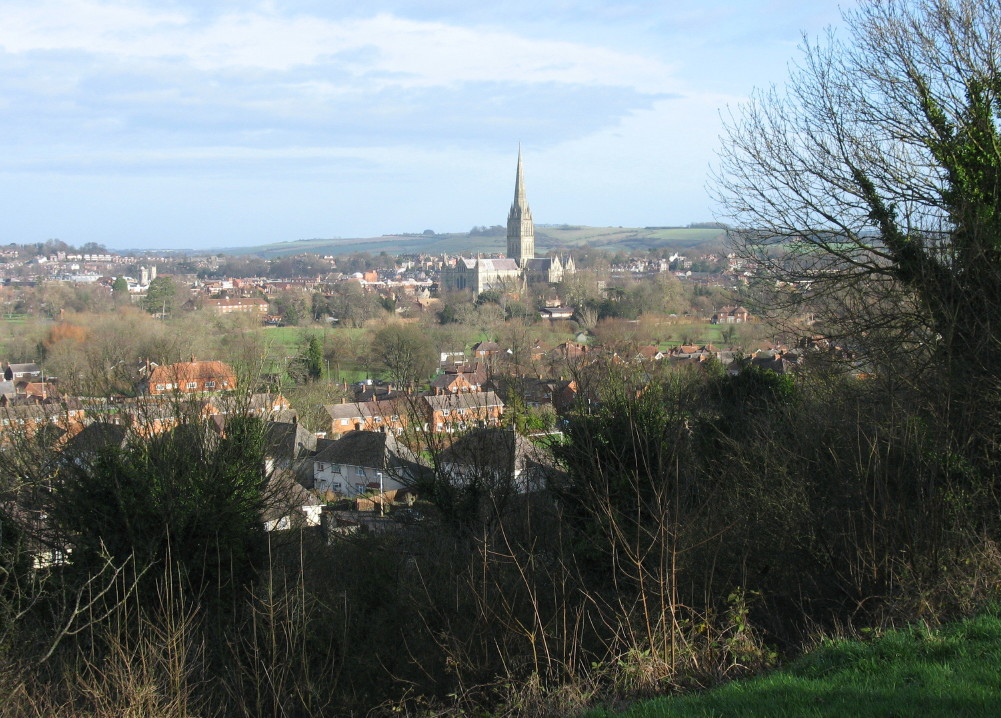
View across West Harnham to Salisbury Cathedral from Harnham Slope

In the 13th century, Salisbury sited its new Cathedral on the flat fertile plain encircled by the Avon and protected by Harnham Hill, a chalk escarpment which rises steeply to the south. Harnham Slope comprises an area of woodland on the northern slope of Harnham Hill, including the West Harnham Chalk Pit, a 2.8 hectares (6.9 acres) geological Site of Special Scientific Interest. The upper slope is now managed as a public amenity space which, from its highest point, offers views across Harnham to the city, including the cathedral's spire.

In 2012, Harnham was the suburb of the city with the largest area of housing valued at more than £400,000.

=== East Harnham ===
East Harnham is centred on a busy roundabout and is 0.8 miles south-south west of Salisbury city centre. The roundabout is one end of the A3094 to Quidhampton and is also the intersection of the A338 and the A354. Attractions in the area include Salisbury Lawn Tennis Club, Bishop Wordsworth's school playing fields and the River Avon which separates it from the rest of Salisbury. The suburb is near the Britford park and ride site, where regular Salisbury Reds bus services connect the area to the city centre.

=== West Harnham ===
West Harnham is an outer suburb of Salisbury, bisected by the A3054/Netherhampton Road, and is north-west of Old Blandford Road. The suburb is home to the Harnham trading estate as well as the local water meadows. West Harnham was incorporated into the city after East Harnham, being further from the city centre.

== Governance ==
The first tier of local government is Salisbury City Council, established in 2009 upon the abolition of Salisbury District. Harnham is split into two electoral divisions for local elections: Harnham East (comprising most of East Harnham, as well as the Close and the Friary) and Harnham West (comprising West and part of East Harnham). Each elects one member of the Wiltshire Council unitary authority and three city councillors.

Prior to redistricting for the 2021 local elections, Harnham ward, with three councillors, used to cover most of the area although the streets north of the Netherhampton Road were in the St Martin's & Cathedral ward. The ward elected one councillor to Wiltshire Council.

== Religious sites ==
=== Church of England ===
In 1881 the long-standing church at West Harnham – previously a chapelry of Coombe Bissett, two miles to the south – was united with the newer church at East Harnham. Since 1972, the name of the parish is 'St. George and All Saints Harnham' and both churches are part of the same Christian community.

==== St George ====
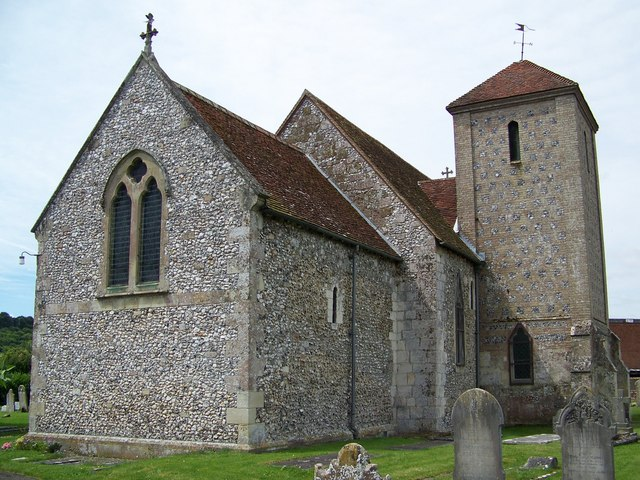
St George's Church, West Harnham

It is certain that the West Harnham church was built or re-built by 1115, the date when King Henry I of England signed a charter granting certain churches to Salisbury Cathedral, including the church at Harnham. A mid-12th-century door survives in the north wall of the nave; the font bowl is also from that century. The chancel was lengthened in the "E.E. style" (i.e. during the 13th century), and probably in the early 14th century the Trinity Chapel on the south side was built.

St George's had some remodelling c1300, and 1300–30 is the indicated date of the south chapel; its tower mostly early 19th century, probably on the site of an earlier tower. William Butterfield led its careful restoration (1873–4). He was responsible in the 1850s for the great church of All Saints, Margaret Street, London which broke new ground in its use of brick and of extensive polychromy detailing. The church was designated as Grade II* listed in 1952.

==== All Saints ====
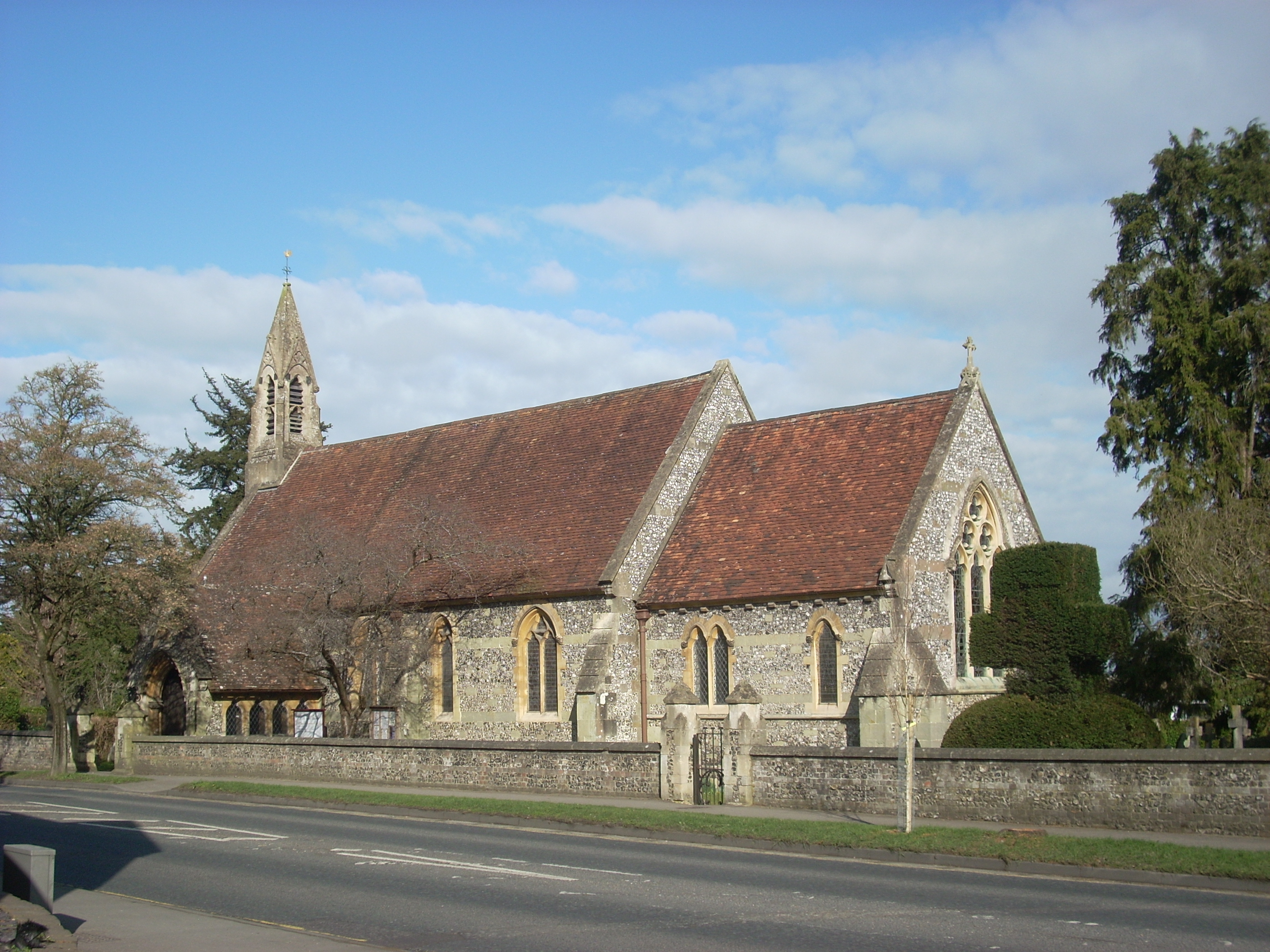
All Saints Church, East Harnham

T.H. Wyatt designed the small All Saints church at East Harnham, completed in 1854. The work was paid for by Isabella Lear, widow of Francis Lear, in memory of her husband who had been Dean of Salisbury. Previously part of Britford parish, a new parish was created for All Saints in 1855.

=== Methodist ===
A small Methodist church was built in Saxon Road in 1952, closed in the 1980s and later demolished.

== Notable buildings ==
=== Ayleswade bridge ===
The 1244 bridge over the Avon is Grade I listed.

=== Mill House and Old Mill ===
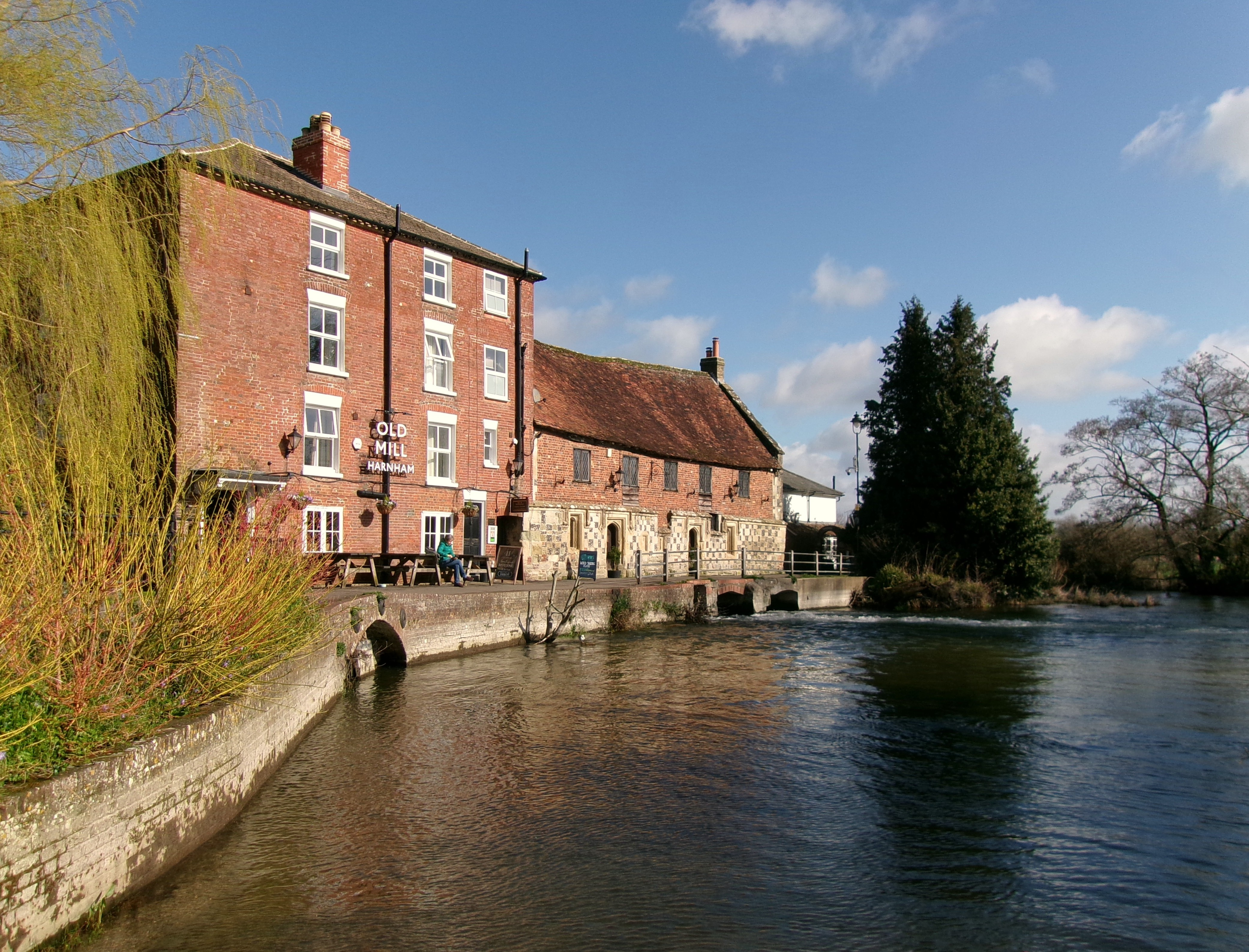
The Old Mill in 2026

Dating from the 12th century, this Grade I listed building in the lower part of West Harnham has details around its doors and windows from 1250. The building was converted in the 16th century from ecclesiastical use to Wiltshire's first paper mill, when the River Nadder was diverted to flow under it.

In the early 20th century, the property was converted into a country club by Mary Fox-Pitt, daughter-in-law of Augustus Pitt Rivers. The atmosphere was praised by the food writer Florence White, author of Good Things in England (1932). She quotes the artist Augustus John saying "It is the best cookery in England."

The building is now a hotel and the mill race can still be seen from its restaurant.

=== Rose and Crown Terrace ===
Rose and Crown Terrace is the largest of the listed buildings in East Harnham; nos 53-61 are listed and all but one have thatched roofs; the style is formal early 19th century Regency.

== Amenities ==
Two schools share one site: Harnham Infant School (ages 4 to 7) and Harnham CofE Junior School (7 to 11).

Recreational amenities include path-laid riverside walks, a thriving lawn tennis club and pitches for both local cricket and football clubs.

There is accommodation at a number of local hotels and bed & breakfasts, making the area popular with both UK and overseas visitors. As well as the Old Mill, local pubs include The Rose and Crown (hotel) and The Grey Fisher.

Harnham Social Club is adjacent to the football pitch below Harnham Slope and there are community halls close to both parish churches.
