= West Harnham Chalk Pit =

Chalk quarry in Wiltshire, England

Coordinates: 51.05750°N 1.81874°W

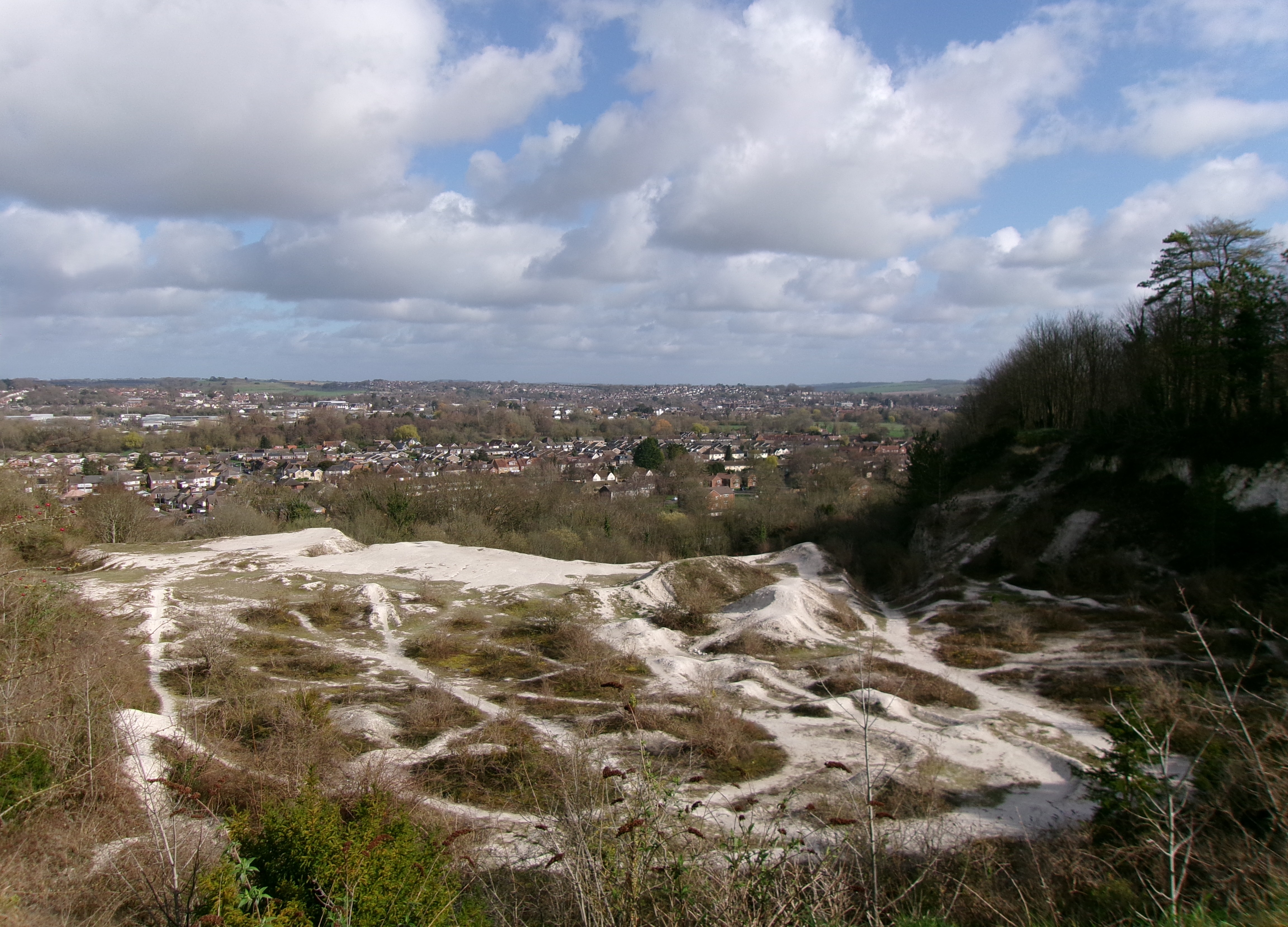
West Harnham Chalk Pit, with Salisbury beyond

West Harnham Chalk Pit (grid reference SU128287) is a 2.8 hectare geological Site of Special Scientific Interest in Wiltshire, England, notified in 1971. Although named for the West Harnham area in the southwest of the city of Salisbury, the site lies in Netherhampton civil parish.

The site is now commonly used by BMX and MTB enthusiasts as a place to exercise their skill on the many formed jumps.

== Sources ==
- Natural England citation sheet for the site (accessed 25 May 2023)
