= Bemerton =

Suburb of Salisbury, England

Coordinates: 51.074°N 1.825°W

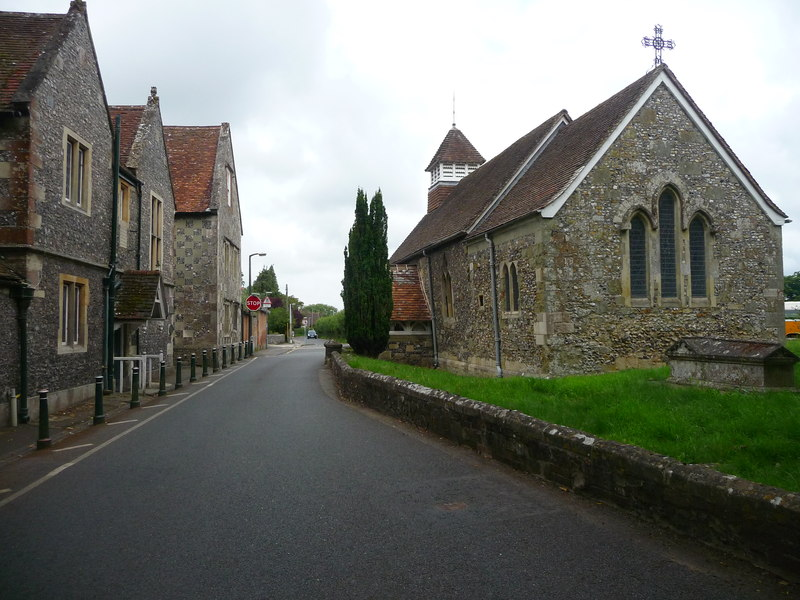
- Former rectory and St Andrew's Church, Bemerton

- Location within Wiltshire
- OS grid reference: SU120306
- Civil parish: Salisbury
- Unitary authority: Wiltshire
- Ceremonial county: Wiltshire
- Region: South West
- Country: England
- Sovereign state: United Kingdom
- Post town: Salisbury
- Postcode district: SP2
- Dialling code: 01722
- Police: Wiltshire
- Fire: Dorset and Wiltshire
- Ambulance: South Western
- UK Parliament: Salisbury

Bemerton, once a rural hamlet and later a civil parish to the west of Salisbury, in Wiltshire, England, is now a suburb of that city. Modern-day Bemerton has areas known as Bemerton Heath, Bemerton Village and Lower Bemerton.

== History ==
In 1086, the Domesday Book recorded four households at Bermentone or Bimertone. Bemerton was formerly a chapelry in the parish of Fugglestone St Peter. On 30 September 1894 Bemerton became a separate civil parish, then on 1 October 1927 a large part of Bemerton was transferred to the borough of Salisbury, and on 1 April 1934 Bemerton civil parish was dissolved: most of its population was transferred to the newly created parish of Quidhampton, and the remainder to Wilton borough. In 1931 the parish had a population of 418.

== Religious sites ==
Bemerton has two Church of England parish churches, and a third which is now a community venue.

=== St Andrew ===
The small St Andrew's Church, built in flint and local limestone, is described by Historic England as "a substantial survival of the form and fabric of a small Medieval village church". A chapel of St Andrew at Bemerton was recorded in 1286, and is known to be dependent on St Peter's, Fugglestone by 1340. The present building is from the 14th century, although a blocked round-arched door survives from a Norman church.

The church has become known for its association with the poet and priest George Herbert (1593–1633). He was appointed rector in 1630 and immediately set about restoring the dilapidated church and its rectory. Herbert's only prose work, A Priest to the Temple (usually known as The Country Parson), offers practical advice to rural clergy. Already ill on his appointment, he died in 1633 aged 39 and was buried at the church.

Repairs and alterations were made in 1776, in 1866 (by T.H. Wyatt) and more thoroughly in 1894–6 by C.E. Ponting, thus little of the early building remains. The small bell-turret was added in the late 18th century.

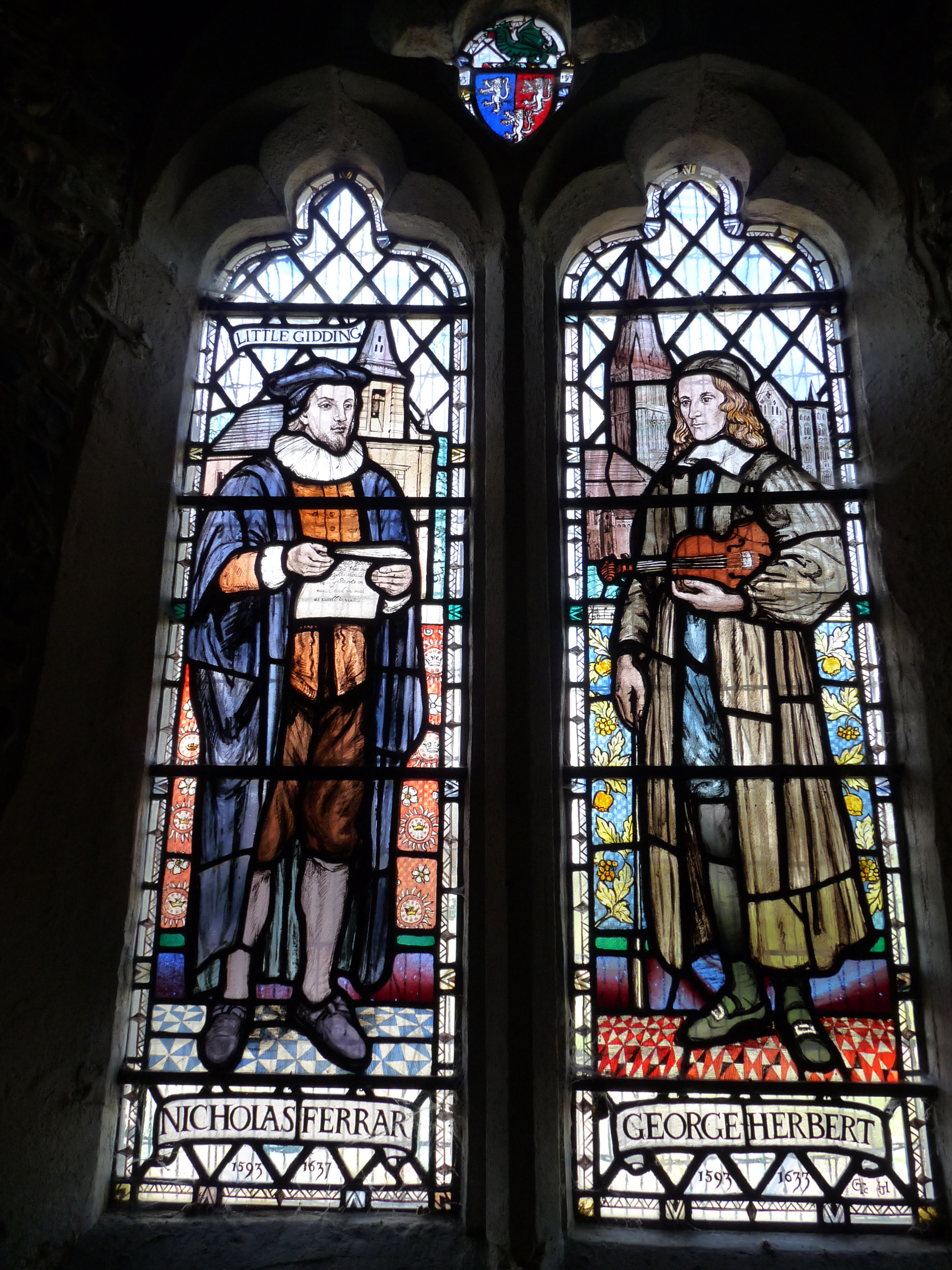
Stained glass window at St Andrew's church, Bemerton, of Nicholas Ferrar and George Herbert

Ponting's restoration added interior fittings in 17th-century style. The 1934 west window depicting Herbert and his friend Nicholas Ferrar is by Townshend and Howson. The church was recorded as Grade II* listed in 1952 and services are still held there, although it has only about 30 seats.

=== St Michael ===
The church of St Michael and All Angels, built in yellow brick with an apsidal chancel, was consecrated in 1957. A district named St Michael had been formed in the north of Bemerton in 1938, taken partly from Fugglestone with Bemerton parish and partly from Fisherton Anger; in 1968, St Michael's parish was merged into Bemerton parish.

=== St John ===
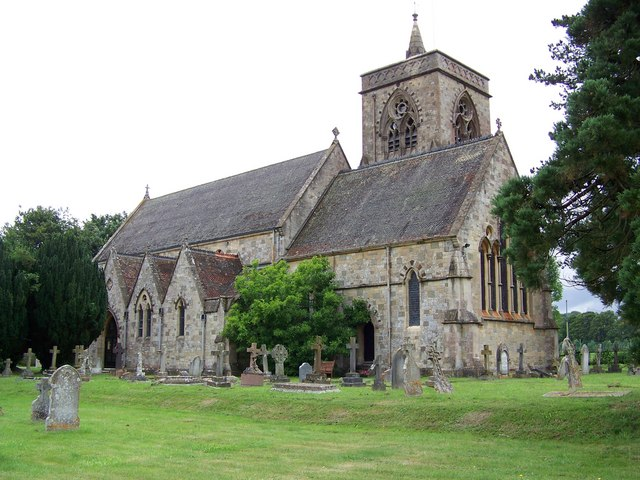
St John's Church, Bemerton

St John's Church was built at Lower Road in 1861, 250 yards west of St Andrew's, as the main church for the parish of Fugglestone with Bemerton, since St Andrew's was too small. It was closed in 2010 and declared redundant. After renovation, the building was reopened in 2016 as a community centre and events venue, and is also used by the nearby St John primary school. A registered charity operates it under the name St John's Place.

The church was designed by T.H. Wyatt in 13th-century style, using local limestone and greensand stones. Finance came from Robert Herbert, 12th Earl of Pembroke and from American admirers of George Herbert. There is one large bell cast by Mears in 1860. The stained glass is from various 19th-century dates, including an early window by Kempe, 1878. Pevsner writes that the interior has "a multitude of well carved naturalistic foliage capitals". Restoration in 1896 by C.E. Ponting included the installation of a fine oak reredos. The building was recorded as Grade II* listed in 1952.

The churchyard contains Commonwealth war graves of a Marine and two British Army soldiers of World War I and a Royal Navy sailor and two soldiers of World War II.

=== Parish ===
The ancient parish of Fugglestone St Peter, or Fugglestone with Bemerton, included Quidhampton tithing. The ecclesiastical parish was unaffected by the breakup of the civil parish in 1894, but was reduced in size in stages in the next century. The parish was renamed Bemerton with Fugglestone in 1969 to reflect the growth in population of Bemerton, and a reorganisation in 1972 saw St Peter's church transfer to Wilton parish, leaving an enlarged Bemerton parish, which continues today.

== Notable buildings ==
Besides the churches of St Andrew and St John, a third building is Grade II* listed: the former rectory, across the road from St Andrew's church. Originating in 1470, it was a small rectangular house in 1630 when George Herbert took up residence. Herbert repaired and restored it, and the building was enlarged in the 18th and 19th centuries. The rectory was recorded as Grade II* listed in 1952. In 2012, the house was owned by novelist and poet Vikram Seth.

== Districts ==
=== Bemerton Village ===
Bemerton Village is an inner-city area west of Fisherton and south of Wilton Road, with the River Nadder forming its southern boundary. The Churchfields industrial estate, which has several car dealerships, is nearby in St Paul's ward.

=== Lower Bemerton ===
Lower Bemerton is a largely residential suburb east of Bemerton Heath and northwest of St Pauls. A Catholic church, St Gregory and The English Martyrs, is here.

=== Bemerton Heath ===
Bemerton Heath is a council estate on the northwestern fringe of Salisbury, north of Wilton Road and southwest of the A360. The area is home to Bemerton Heath Harlequins F.C., as well as a few businesses and a post office.

== Governance ==
Salisbury City Council is the first tier of local government, and the upper tier is Wiltshire Council, a unitary authority with headquarters in Trowbridge. There are two electoral wards: Bemerton ward covers Bemerton Heath, while Fisherton & Bemerton Village ward includes Lower Bemerton and Bemerton Village. Each ward elects three city councillors and one member of Wiltshire Council.

== Amenities ==
Sarum Academy, a secondary school, is at Bemerton Heath.

The Salisbury and South Wiltshire Sports Club ground at Skew Bridge, Lower Bemerton, has been a cricket venue since 1854. The ground is the home of South Wilts Cricket Club and is one of the grounds used by Wiltshire County; it also has football and hockey facilities.

Bemerton has a non-League football club, Bemerton Heath Harlequins F.C., which plays at Westwood Recreation Ground/Moon Park on Western Way.

== Notable people ==
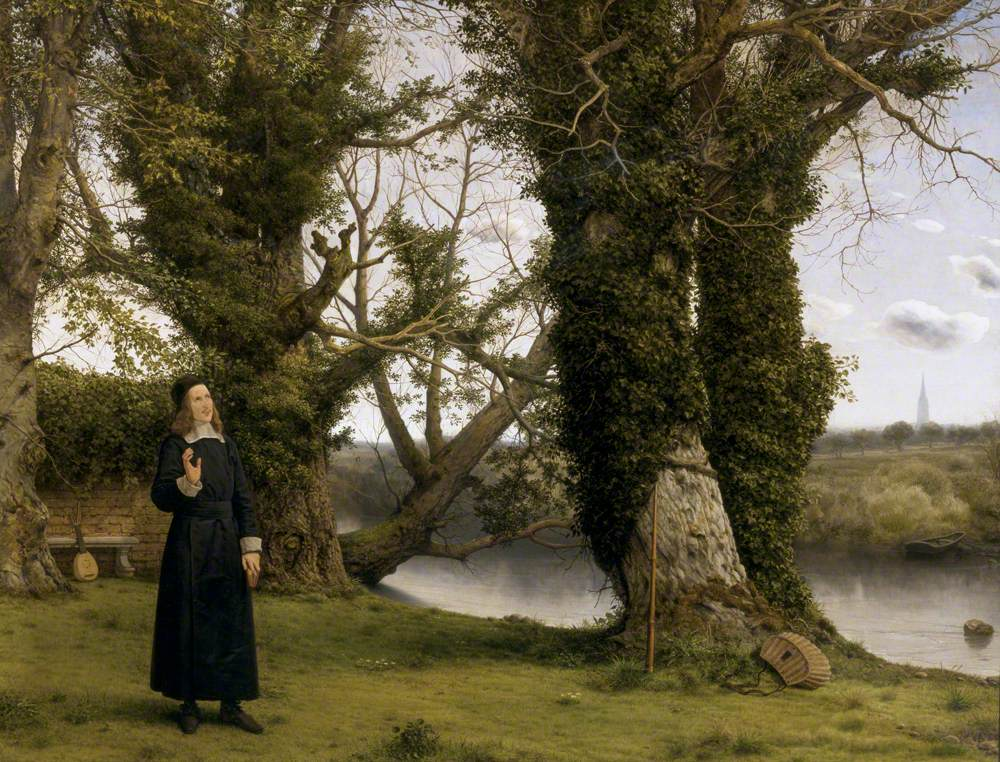
George Herbert at Bemerton by William Dyce, 1860

Poet George Herbert was rector of Fugglestone with Bemerton from 1630 until his death in 1633, and is buried at St Andrew's.

John Norris was rector from 1692 until 1711: a philosopher, poet and theologian whose metaphysics were closely associated with those of the French priest and philosopher Nicolas Malebranche.

William Coxe (1748–1828) was rector of Fugglestone with Bemerton from 1788 until his death in 1828; he wrote travel books, biographies of Sir Robert Walpole and others, and a history of the county of Montgomery.

Naval officer John Fulford (1809–1888) took up residence at Riversfield House, Lower Road in later life. In 1859 he had been captain of HMS Ganges, alongside Admiral Baynes, at the confrontation called the Pig War – a dispute with the United States over the position of the border among the San Juan Islands near Vancouver. Fulford was promoted to admiral in retirement, and was buried at Bemerton church.

William Hurlstone (1876–1906), musical prodigy and composer, moved to Bemerton from West Brompton with his family in 1883 and became a chorister in the local church. The vicar was so impressed with him that he invited Hubert Parry and George Grove from the Royal College of Music to hear him in Salisbury. Due to declining family fortunes they moved to South Norwood in 1886.

Vikram Seth, poet and novelist (born 1952 in Calcutta (now Kolkata)), renovated and resided in the erstwhile Bemerton residence of the poet and Anglican priest George Herbert.

== See also ==
- Radio Bemerton

== Sources ==
- Pevsner, Nikolaus (1975). Cherry, Bridget (ed.). The Buildings of England: Wiltshire. Harmondsworth: Penguin Books. pp. 106–107. ISBN 0-14-0710-26-4.
