= Docton =

Historic estate in Devon, England

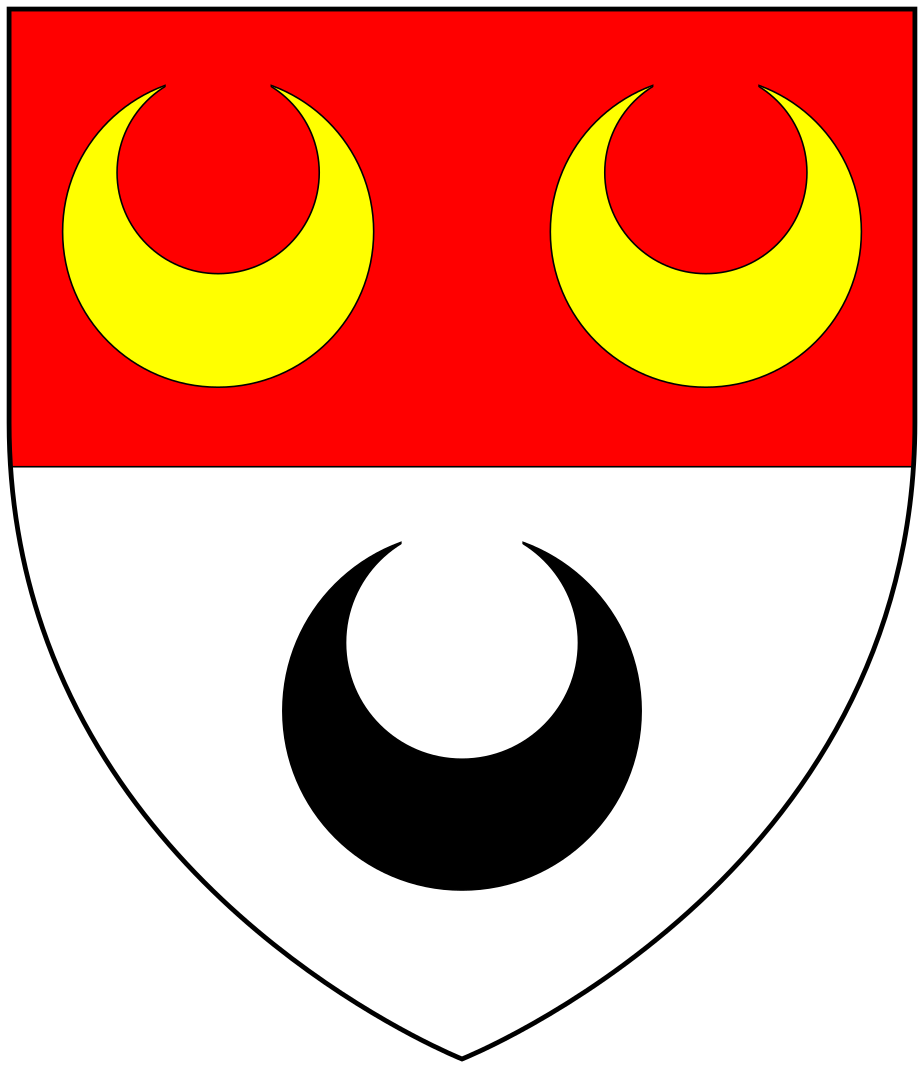
Arms of Docton of Docton: Per fess gules and argent, two crescents in chief or another in base sable

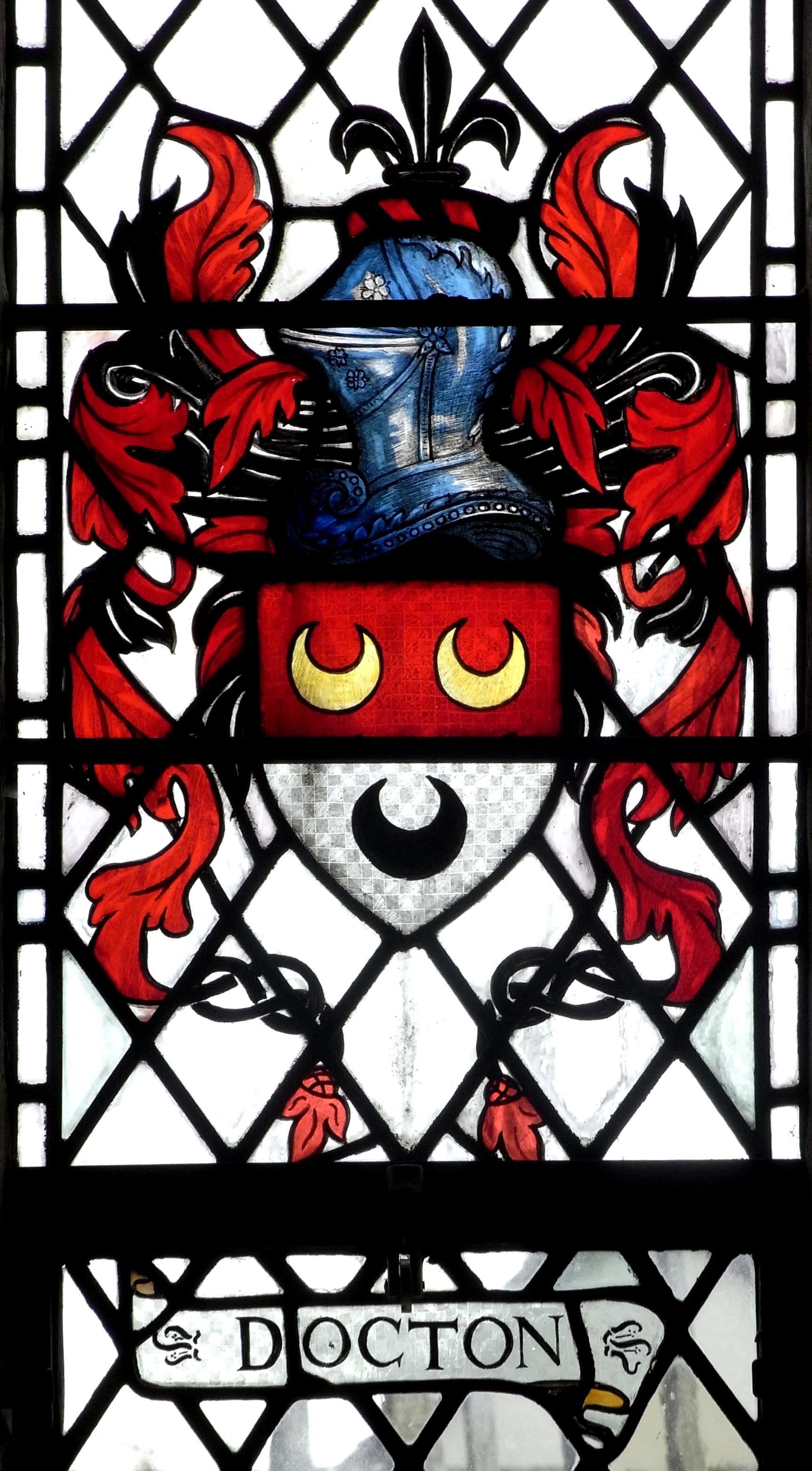
Arms of Docton of Docton, in the parish of Hartland, Devon: Per fess gules and argent, two crescents in chief or another in base sable. 1933 stained glass window in St Nectan's Church, Hartland, by Townshend and Howson

Docton is an historic estate in the parish of Hartland in Devon, England. The former "mansion house", 3 miles south-west of the village of Hartland, was the residence of the Docton (originally de Docton) family from the 15th century. Today the estate comprises separate holdings of Docton Farm, a working farm which operates holiday-let cottages, and Docton Mill, the estate's former corn mill, which is operated as tea-rooms with a garden open to the public.

== Descent ==
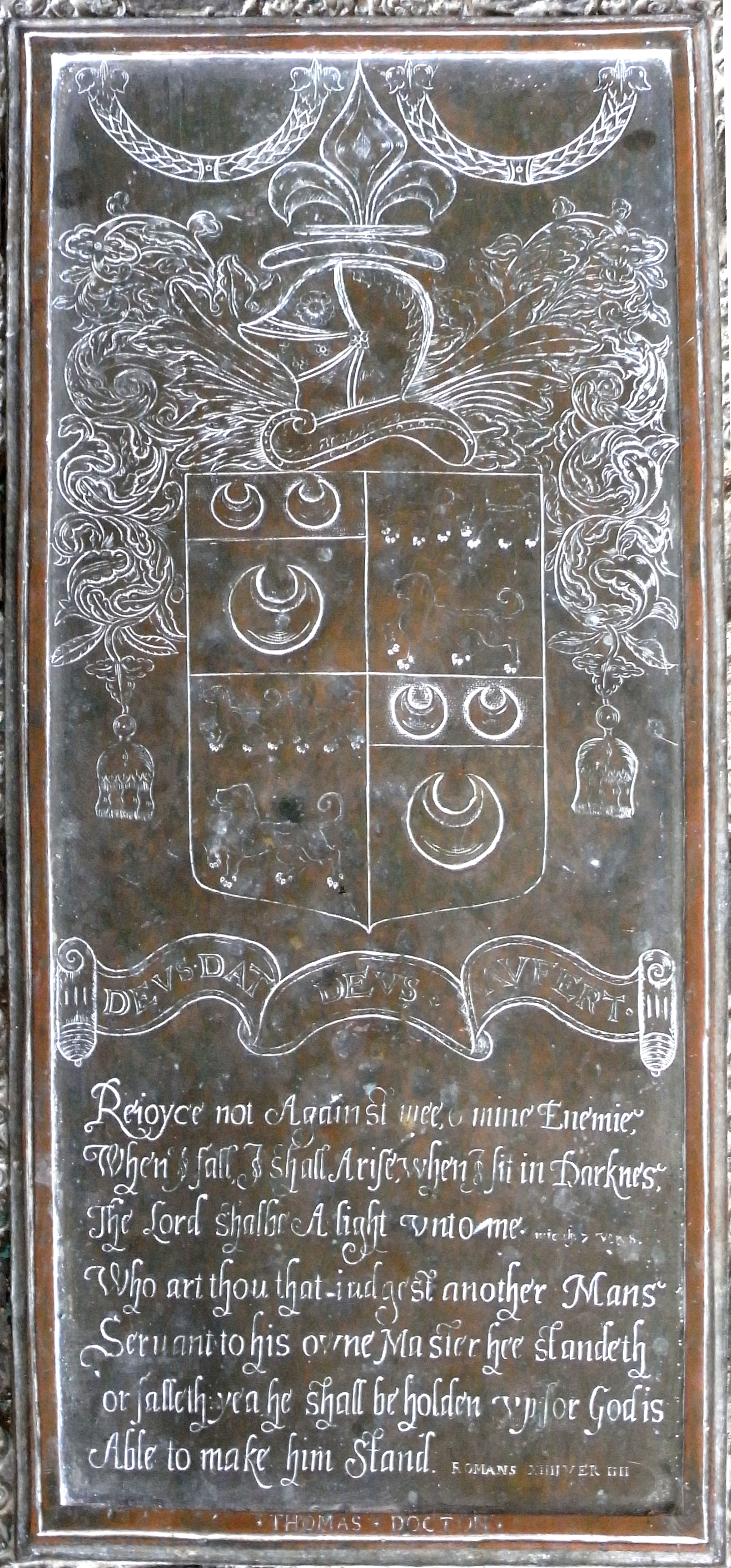
Detail from ledger stone of Thomas Docton (d.1618) of Docton, showing the arms of Docton (Per fess gules and argent, two crescents in chief or another in base sable) quartering Chantrell, his mother's family (Argent, three talbots passant sable)

The arms of the Docton family were: Per fess gules and argent, two crescents in chief or another in base sable. These may be seen, amongst other places, in a 1933 stained glass window in St Nectan's Church, Hartland, by Townshend and Howson and on the ledger stone to Phillipa Cary (1603–1633) in Clovelly Church.

- John I Doketon (fl. 1459) of Kilkhampton in Cornwall, near Docton.
- Thomas Doketon (fl.15th c.) (son) "de Doketon in hundred de Hartland" is the earliest member of this family recorded in the Heraldic Visitations of Devon, from information submitted by the family to the heralds in 1620. He married Alicia Ashe.
- John II Doketon, eldest son and heir, who married Agnes Chantrell (d.1585), heiress of her father. The arms of Chantrell (Argent, three talbots passant sable) are thus shown quartered by Docton on the ledger stone of her son Thomas I Doketon (d.1618) in Hartland Church.
- Thomas I Doketon (d.1618), eldest son and heir. He married Alice Atkin (d.1619), daughter of John Atkin of Blegberry in the parish of Hartland. A monument to Alice survives in Hartland Church. He is said by Chope (1940) (but without source being stated) to have supposedly in wrath killed his own son Nicholas Docton (1574–1610) by hitting him with a belt buckle. His ledger stone in St Nectan's Church, Hartland, bore originally a "quaint" epitaph which is oft-quoted, for example in Epitaphs for Country Churchyards by Augustus John Cuthbert Hare. It begins "Rejoice not over me, oh my enemie" but was originally surrounded by a brass ledger line inscribed with the following verse:

"Here l lie outside the chancel door;
Here I lie because I'm poor:
The further in, the more they pay;
But here I lie as warm as they".

The slab was originally placed in the churchyard outside the chancel door, but in 1848 was brought inside and set into the floor of the chancel. However, it "disproves the assertion of poverty" as it is a costly item comprising a brass plate beautifully engraved with the arms of Docton quartering Chantrell. Below are two texts from the Bible. The ledger stone of his wife Alice Atkin in similar form survives. As he left no surviving issue he "left his inheritance to one of his name", namely his first cousin Thomas II Docton (d.1638), the eldest son of Richard Docton (d.1570/1) of Welsford.

- Thomas II Docton (d.1638), first cousin, who in 1598 married Susan Batacom (d.1634) of Tavistock, Devon.
- John III Docton (1600–1653), eldest son and heir. He was lord of the manor of Stoke by Hartland, as is revealed by his will. He married three times:
  - Firstly in 1621 to Ellen Harper (d.1624)
  - Secondly to Phillipa Cary (1603–1633), second daughter of William II Cary (1576–1652), lord of the manor of Clovelly, JP for Devon, MP for Mitchell, Cornwall, in 1604, She died after one year of marriage and left an only daughter Phillipa Docton. Her elaborately sculpted ledger stone survives in Clovelly Church.
  - Thirdly to Cicely (d.1639)
- Thomas III Docton (born 1635), eldest son and heir, a minor at his father's death, whose wardship was provided for in his father's will.
- Phillip Docton (1667–1743), whose parentage is unclear, the last in the male line of the Docton family of Docton, whose ledger stone survives in Hartland Church, formerly in a place of great honour within the communion rails. It is inscribed: "A gentleman eminent for his strict honour and integrity". He married Elizabeth Herle (1680–1718), daughter of Nicholas Herle of Landue in Cornwall. The ledger stone displays the arms of Docton impaling Herle (Gules, a fess sable between three shoveller ducks proper).

== Sources ==
- Chope, R.Pearse, The Book of Hartland, Torquay, 1940
- Vivian, Lt.Col. J.L., (Ed.) The Visitations of the County of Devon: Comprising the Heralds' Visitations of 1531, 1564 & 1620, Exeter, 1895, pp. 286–7, pedigree of Docton of Docton
