= Sarum Academy =

Location
- Westwood Road; Salisbury, Wiltshire, SP2 9HS; England; 51°05′09″N 1°50′09″W

Information
- Type: Academy
- Religious affiliation: Church of England
- Established: 2010
- Local authority: Wiltshire
- Department for Education URN: 136183 Tables
- Ofsted: Reports
- Headteacher: Jonathan Curtis
- Gender: Coeducational
- Age: 11 to 19
- Enrolment: 608 (March 2023)
- Website: www.sarumacademy.org

Sarum Academy (formerly Salisbury High School) is a Church of England secondary school with academy status in Salisbury, Wiltshire, England. The school is on the west side of Salisbury, on Bemerton Heath.

== History ==
The first buildings on the site were opened in 1957 for boys of St Thomas's School in central Salisbury, which at that time was a Church of England secondary modern school; after the buildings were extended in the early 1960s the rest of the boys' school moved there. Westwood County Girls' Secondary Modern School was opened on an adjoining site in 1958, and in 1973 the two schools merged to form Westwood St. Thomas's School, which became a comprehensive school. From 1997 the school was called Salisbury High School.

The school converted to academy status in 2010 and reopened as Sarum Academy. Since November 2017 it has been sponsored by Magna Learning Partnership, alongside Wyvern St Edmund's and Salisbury Sixth Form College in the Salisbury area, and The Trafalgar School at Downton.
