= Salisbury and South Wiltshire Sports Club =

Sports ground in England

Salisbury and South Wilts Sports Club
- Skew Bridge, Lower Bemerton
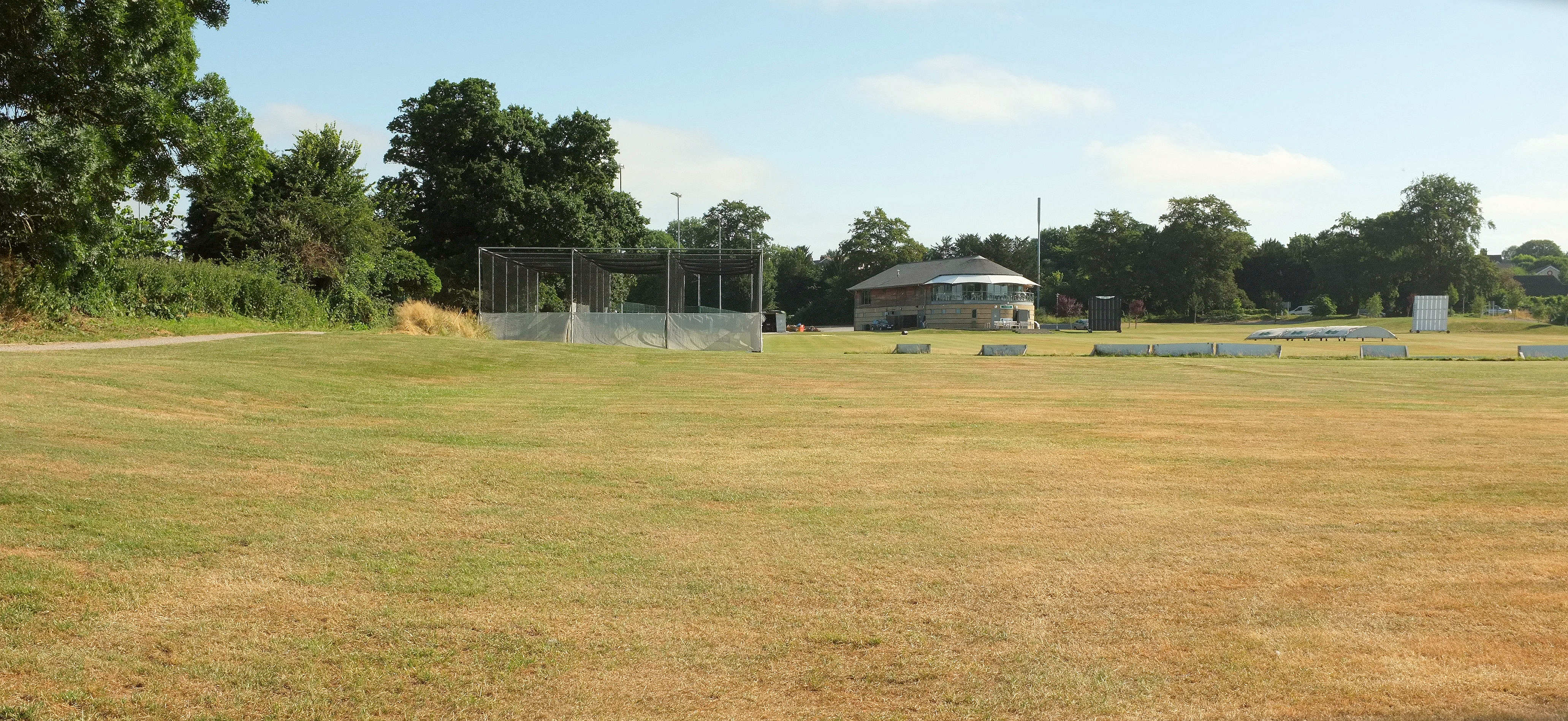
- Interactive map of Salisbury and South Wilts Sports Club

Ground information
- Location: Salisbury, Wiltshire
- Country: England
- Coordinates: 51.0759°N 1.8262°W
- Establishment: 1849
- End names
- Wilton Road End; Lower Bemerton End

Team information
Wiltshire C.C.C	(1905–present)
South Wilts C.C	(1849–present)
Salisbury Hockey Club	(1895–present)
Salisbury Wanderers C.C	(1984–2001)
Bemerton Athletic F.C	(1945–1989)
Bemerton Heath Harlequins F.C	(1989–1990)

The Salisbury and South Wiltshire Sports Club (also known as the County Ground) is a sports ground in Salisbury, Wiltshire, England, which is used for hockey, cricket and other sports.

== Hockey ==
Salisbury Hockey Club runs Women's and Men's teams and has a Junior section.

== Cricket ==
The first recorded cricket match at the ground was in 1854, when South Wiltshire played an All England Eleven. The ground first hosted Wiltshire County Cricket Club in 1888, and hosted its first Minor Counties Championship match 17 years later when Wiltshire played Hertfordshire in 1905. The ground next hosted Wiltshire's home matches from 1923 to 1949 and then from 1958 to the present day. The ground has also hosted a single MCCA Knockout Trophy match between Wiltshire and Herefordshire.

The ground has also hosted List A matches. The first List-A match at the ground was between Wiltshire and Scotland in the 2000 NatWest Trophy. The ground has hosted two further List-A matches involving Wiltshire: against Ireland in the 2002 Cheltenham & Gloucester Trophy, and Kent in the 2005 Cheltenham & Gloucester Trophy.

In local domestic cricket, the ground is the home of South Wilts Cricket Club who play in the Southern Premier Cricket League. South Wilts have been playing on the main ground since 1854. The second cricket ground was created in 1984 and Salisbury Wanderers played there from 1984 until 2001 where they folded. Since 2001, the second ground has been home of the club's Third and Fourth XI's.

== Facilities ==
Th clubhouse has changing rooms, a bar and two function rooms that are available to hire.

The first pavilion, a small one-storey building, was built at the Wilton Road ground in 1955 at a cost of £1,000 to accommodate South Wilts Cricket Club and Bemerton Athletic Football Club. This pavilion was closed in 2012, after a long-running fundraising effort for a new clubhouse was completed. The new clubhouse was built with costs rising to £1.2 million; it is a two-storey building that caters for hockey and football in the winter and cricket in the summer.
