= Bemerton Rectory =

House in Bemerton, Wiltshire, England

Coordinates: 51°04′26″N 1°49′31″W

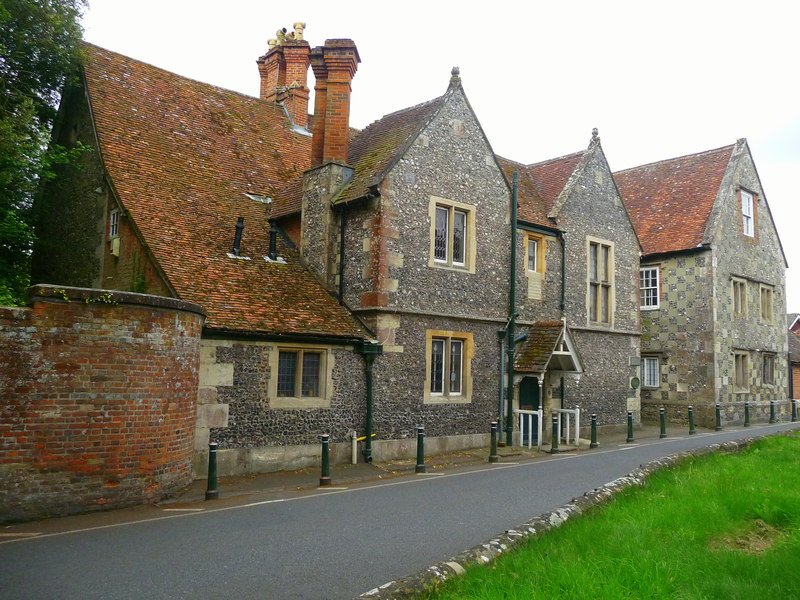
Bemerton Rectory

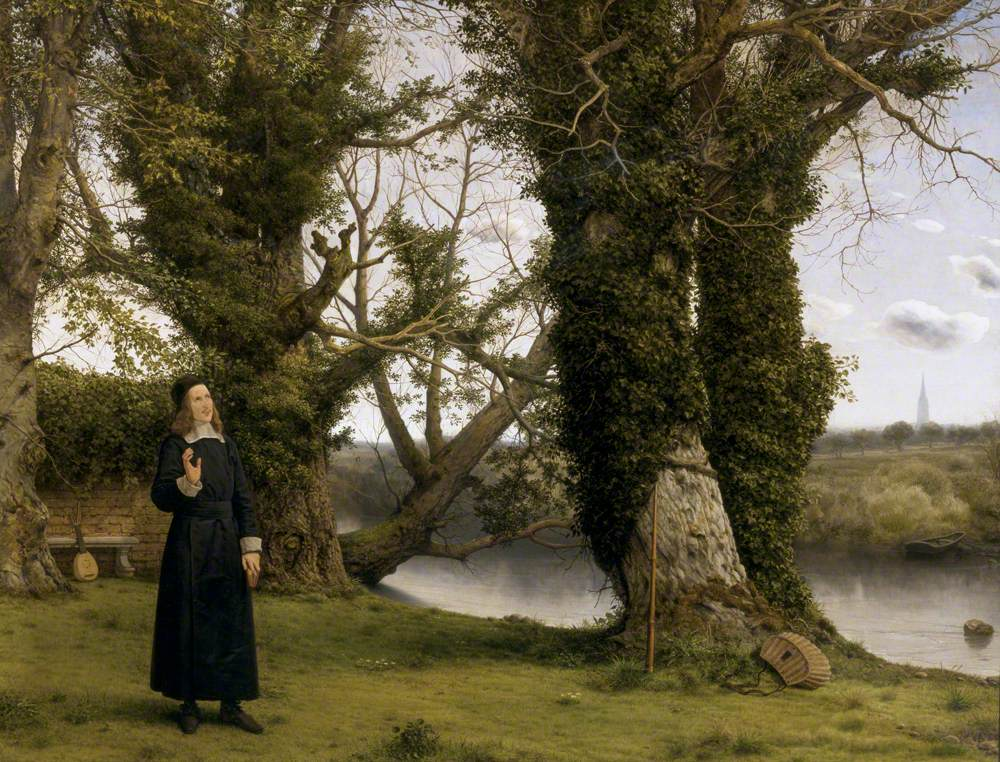
George Herbert at Bemerton by William Dyce, 1860

Bemerton Rectory is a Grade II* listed rectory in Lower Road in the Bemerton suburb of Salisbury, Wiltshire, England. It dates from 1470. It was the home of George Herbert, who died there in 1633. Indian novelist and poet Vikram Seth currently resides in the house, having bought and renovated it in 1996.
