= Edward Slow =

Edward Slow (27 August 1841 – 16 February 1925) was a poet born in Wilton, Wiltshire, England. By profession a carriage builder, he wrote many poems and tracts based on his everyday observations of contemporary Victorian and Edwardian rural life. The poems, or 'rhymes' as he preferred to call them, were written in a style that was intended to phonetically emulate the rural Wiltshire accent.

== Life ==
He was born the youngest of at least four siblings. His mother was a silk weaver in Wilton and his father died when Edward was 8 years old. He attended Wilton Free School and then obtained an apprenticeship with a Salisbury coach-builder and wheelwright. He later returned to Wilton where he set up his own carriage building business which he eventually sold in the 1890s. He then embarked on a 30-year retirement during which he involved himself in local politics and writing. He was Mayor of Wilton in 1892 and again in 1905.

== Poetry ==
Slow discovered his talent when he was invited to write something for a Harvest Supper in nearby Burcombe. His poem proved a great success and the sale of copies spurred him to produce more. His first collection, Poems in the Wiltshire Dialect, was published in 1867 by a Salisbury printer, Frederick Blake. After Blake's death in 1892 Slow's work was published by R. R. Edwards, also of Salisbury. From this time, Slow produced some prose work and he included a glossary of Wiltshire dialect words with his fourth volume. He also contributed to the English Dialect Society.

His largest book was Humorous West Countrie Tales, published in 1899, a collection of stories and some jokes he had collected from local people or had experienced himself.

Slow's poetry, with its perceptive, descriptive style, often with a wry biting humour, provides an insight into the everyday lives of rural people in late Victorian and Edwardian southern England.

=== Examples ===
Blondin at Wilton Park. (Bank Holiday, August 4, 1873) (extract)

...An then to ael tha vokes zaprize,
He tied a bandage roun his eyes.
An all his head an half his back,
He put into a girt thick zack:
An once agean he took pole in han,
An tried upon tha rope ta stan,
Purtendin two or dree times ta slip,
Bit that wur all a bit a flip;
Var on a went as blinds a bat,
An steady as a mouse or cat.
An zome did cry, “Zure, zure, he'll vall,
Var he can't see a glimpse at all”...

Gramfer's Crismus (extract)

...Then Father Crismus mead a spache,
A wishen ael good cheer;
Likewise a merry Crismis tide,
An happy, bright new year.
An atter that, they ate an drunk,
As much as they wur willin;
Then out comes grammer, an she gies
To every man a shillin...
