= Radio Bemerton =

Community radio station

Radio Bemerton was a part-time community radio station in Wiltshire, England. The station was established in 2000 in order to provide training and learning opportunities for adults in the Bemerton Heath area of the city of Salisbury. It was operated by Wiltshire Community Media Foundation, a not-for-profit company. As of 2005, the promoters were Wiltshire College, Salisbury District Council and the Learning & Skills Council.

The project regularly recruited members from the local area and provided training in broadcasting skills. The wider aim, however, was to provide an opportunity for its members to gain better skills in all forms of communication, including, reading, writing and general conversational skills.

Training was ongoing; however, each year the radio station staged a live broadcast period ranging from 1 to 28 days in duration. The broadcast was a showcase for the work prepared in previous months by its members and allows the project to reach the wider community.

When broadcasting, Radio Bemerton covered an area of approximately 8 miles from its purpose-built studios on Bemerton Heath. The station broadcasts on the FM waveband under the Restricted Service Licence scheme operated by Ofcom.

In its later years, the station operated a number of projects aimed at a younger age group, typically 11 to 17-year-olds. Whilst the primary aims of the project remained unchanged, the station adopted a more modern feel and broadcast under the name WicKID FM to reflect its younger members and target audience.

== Broadcasts ==
=== 2008 ===
Radio Bemerton's broadcast started on 14 April and ran until 19 April 2008. As in previous years, the station used the name WicKID FM and could be heard on 87.8 FM.
