= East Harnham Meadows =

Protected area in Wiltshire, England

Coordinates: 51.05924°N 1.78592°W

East Harnham Meadows (grid reference SU151289) is a 17.29 hectare biological Site of Special Scientific Interest in Wiltshire, England, in the Harnham suburb to the south-east of the city of Salisbury. The water-meadows are in the flood-plain of the River Avon.

The site was notified in 1995 for its herb-rich grassland.
