= South Wilts Cricket Club =

- League: Southern Cricket League (3rd/10)

Personnel
- Captain: Ben Draper
- Coach: Thomas Morton

Team information
- Home ground: Salisbury and South Wiltshire Sports Club
- Official website: www.southwiltscc.com

South Wilts Cricket Club is an English amateur cricket club based in of Salisbury, Wiltshire.

South Wilts is one of Wiltshire's leading cricket clubs, having won the Southern Premier Cricket League five times along with a hat-trick of T20 victories from 2013 to 2015. On Saturdays it runs four senior men's teams, playing in the Southern and Hampshire Leagues, and there are junior boys', women's and girls' sides on other days of the week.

Home matches are played at the Salisbury and South Wiltshire Sports Club ground in the Bemerton area of Salisbury. The ground currently hosts Wiltshire CCC matches and is also used for county representative fixtures and ECB Finals Days.

== Major honours ==
- Southern Cricket League (1969–1999)
  - Champions – 1990
  - Runners-Up – 1971, 1999
- Southern Premier Cricket League (2000–)
  - Champions – 2004, 2012, 2013, 2014, 2015, 2021
  - Runners-Up – 2005, 2008, 2009
- Southern Cricket League Evening Knockout (1977–2001)
  - Champions – 1991
  - Runners-Up – 1978
- Southern Premier League Twenty20 (2002–)
  - Champions – 2002, 2006, 2013, 2014, 2015
  - Runners-Up – 2018
- Southern Premier League Division Three (Second XI)
  - Champions – 2015
  - Runners-Up – 2018
- Hampshire Cricket League County One (Second XI)
  - Champions = 2006, 2010
- Hampshire Cricket League County Three (Third XI)
  - Champions = 2003

== Teams ==
- First XI – Southern Premier Cricket League
- Second XI – Southern Premier Cricket League Division Two
- Third XI – Hampshire Cricket League Division Two
- Fourth XI – Hampshire Cricket League Division Five North West
- Youth Teams – Wiltshire Youth Cricket League, ECB National Club U13/U15/U19 Championships

== First Class cricketers ==
- Ryan Burl
- Manzoor Elahi
- Roger Fouhy
- Ian Holland
- Alan Kruger
- Jason Laney
- Glenn Maxwell
- Chris Rogers
- Angus Small
- Roger Sillence
- Keith Tomlins
- James Tomlinson
- Rowan Varner
- Ryan Duffield
