= List of works by Townshend and Howson =

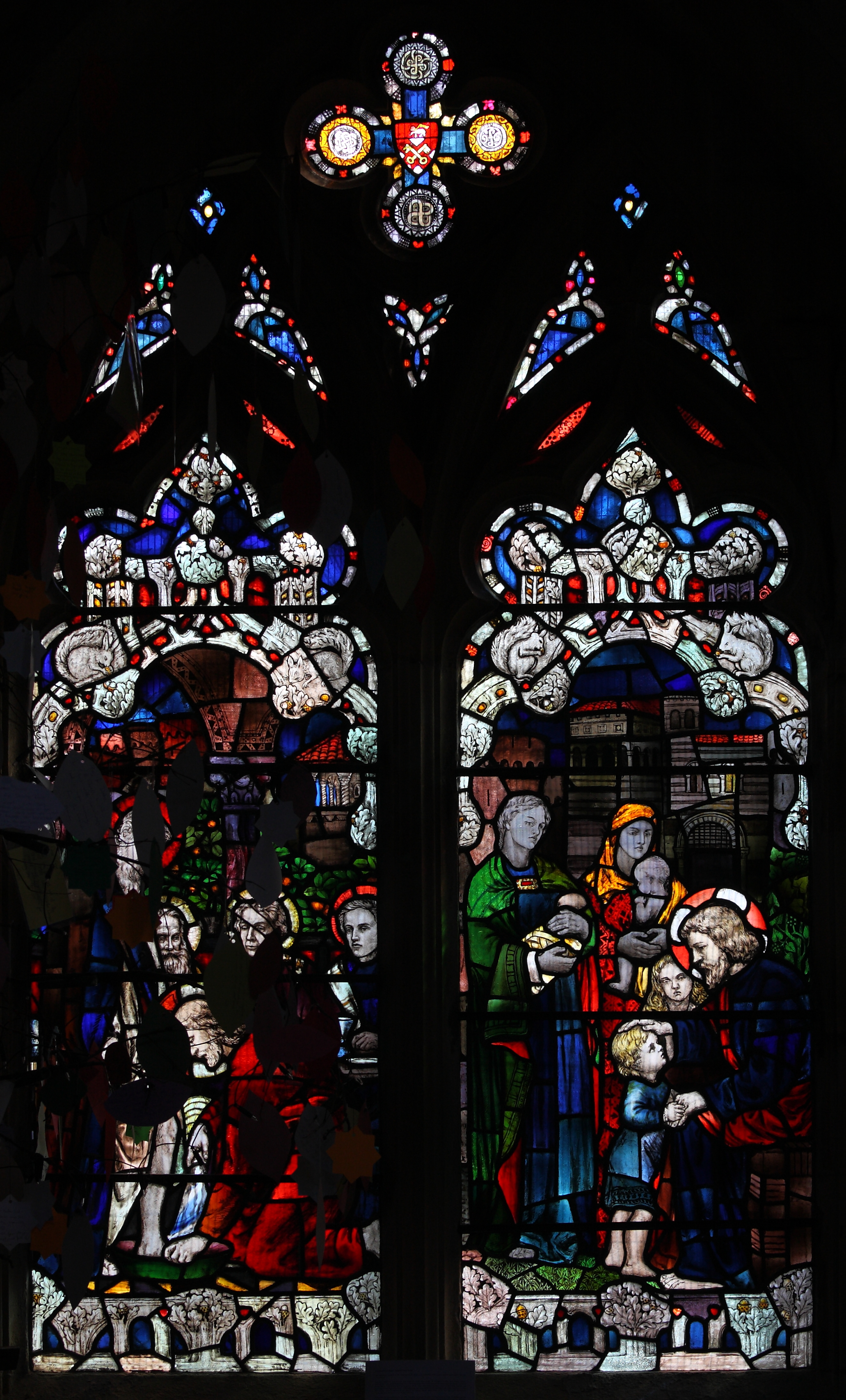
Window in St Andrew Aysgarth

A list of the major works of the Arts and Crafts stained glass artist Caroline Townshend, including works made together with Joan Howson.

== Works ==
=== All Saints' ===
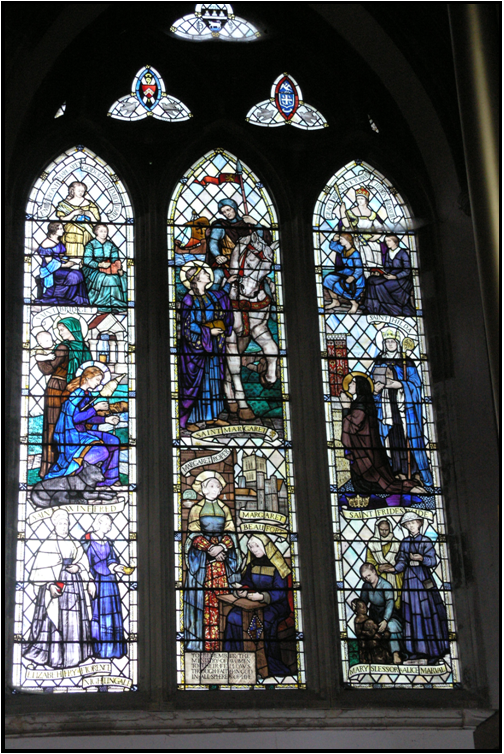
The High Wycombe "Dove" window

- Location: High Wycombe, Buckinghamshire
- Year: 1932a

The three-light Dove window in the North Aisle was made by Townshend and Howson and designed by Townshend. It was commissioned by Frances Dove, founder of Townshend's school Wycombe Abbey, to pay tribute to the achievement of women through the ages.

It depicts famous women:

- In the left panel, Townshend and Howson depicted Emily Brontë, Emily Davies (the first principal of Girton), St Bridget, St Winifred, Elizabeth Fry (the prison reformer) and Florence Nightingale. They also listed the names of Maude Royden and Dame Millicent Fawcett, both suffragettes, Agnata Ramsay (the first woman to achieve a classics tripos at Cambridge), Mary Kingsley, Hannah More (anti-slavery writer and friend of Wilberforce) and Edith Cavell.
- In the centre panels are depictions of St Margaret the Scottish Queen Margaret Roper (daughter to Sir Thomas More, Margaret Beaufort (mother of Henry VII and benefactress of Oxford and Cambridge universities) and Anne Clough (the first principal of Newnham College). Also included are the names Josephine Butler (the social reformer), Octavia Hill (co-founder of the National Trust), Jenny Lind (opera singer), Sophia Jex-Blake (a pioneer of medical education for women), Elizabeth Garrett Anderson (first woman member of the British Medical Association) and Agnes Jones the nurse praised by Florence Nightingale.
- In the right hand panel are depicted Grace Darling, Queen Victoria, Christina Rossetti and St Hilda together with the names St Frideswide, Mary Slessor (the Scottish missionary), Alice Marval (who died caring for plague victims in India), Amy Johnson, and Elsie Inglis, a suffragette who took women’s medical units to serve on the Western Front in the Great War.

=== Carlisle Cathedral ===
- Location: Carlisle, Cumbria
- Year: 1925

Townshend and Howson reset some fragments of old glass in the Nave North with a purplish grisaille background.

=== Chichester Cathedral ===
- Location: Chichester, Sussex
- Year: 1922

Townshend and Howson were responsible for the two-light window which depicts St Edmund Pontigny and St Thomas Becket. It is in the North Nave of the Cathedral.

=== The Children’s Church at Barnado’s ===
- Location: Woodford Bridge, Essex
- Year: 1936

Townshend and Howson were responsible for the stained glass which was in the East end of this church and the Aisle windows. The window is now part of the Prince Regent Hotel in Woodford Bridge, Essex.

=== Dornoch Cathedral ===
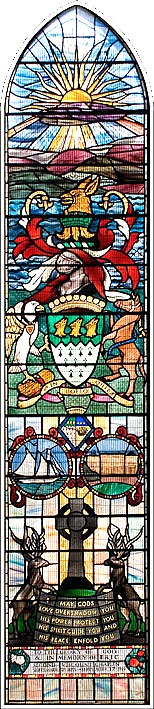
Window in Dornoch Cathedral

- Location: Dornoch, Sutherland
- Year: 1953

Townshend and Howson were responsible for the single light window on the left of the South side of the Chancel

=== Emmanuel Church ===
- Location: Fazakerley, Merseyside

This church has a Townshend and Howson East window which was installed in 1929. The windows are described by Richard Pollard and Nikolaus Pevsner as "large for them".

=== The Gate House ===
- Location: Eskdale, Cumbria
- Year: 1921

The Gate House in Eskdale Green, Holmrook, is managed by the Outward Bound Trust. According to Matthew Hyde and Nikolaus Pevsner, "off the huge library occupying the tower base opens a winter garden containing glass of 1921".

=== Giggleswick School, Yorkshire ===
A window in the old school hall.

=== Hannington Hall ===
- Location: Oxford, Oxfordshire

The dining room of St Peter's College in Oxford is known as Hannington Hall and this has a three-light Townshend and Howson window which dates from 1928/29. It depicts Bishop James Hannington.

=== Hartland Abbey ===
- Location: Hartland, Devon
- Years: 1933

Townshend and Howson made some small roundels, possibly as part of an original set, and four of these were incorporated in a central window of Hartland Abbey. The Stucley family owners of the Abbey were benefactors of the repairs undertaken at St Nectan's Church Hartland and these roundels match the others in the Mary Chapel at the church.

=== Holy Trinity ===
- Location: Leamington, Warwickshire
- Year: 1935

Townshend and Howson were responsible for the North Transept window, known as the “Dove Window”.

=== Huyton College ===
- Location: Huyton, Liverpool

Huyton College was the sister school to Liverpool College and Howson designed and installed a two-light window in the college's chapel. From an article entitled ‘ The New Chapel at the Liverpool College for Girls, Liverpool’:

"At the west end of the Chapel and on the south side is a very beautiful two-light window, presented by Miss Howson, depicting Sir Percival and Sir Galahad, and bearing the legends “Sir Percival, mightiest and purest among men”; and “I saw the Holy Grail, and in the strength of this I rode shattering all evil customs everywhere". The Ven. Archdeacon Howson.

=== Little Hampton Parish Church ===
- Location: Little Hampden, Buckinghamshire
- Year: 1930

Single-light window features St Christopher.

=== The Outward Bound Trust ===
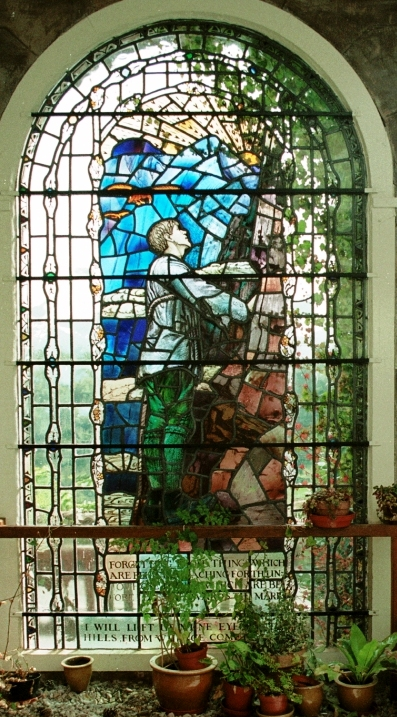
Window originally in Platt Mill Manchester, now at The Outward Bound Trust's centre in Eskdale

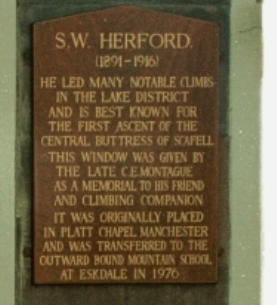
Plaque that accompanies the stained glass window by Townshend and Howson

- Location: Eskdale, Cumbria
- Year: 1921

Townshend designed a window for Platt Chapel in Manchester in memory of a mountain climber. Platt Chapel no longer operates as a chapel and the window was transferred to The Outward Bound Trust's centre in Eskdale.

=== Royal Southern Hospital ===
- Location: Liverpool
- Year: 1931

Townshend and Howson completed two windows for the hospital's chapel. One features Florence Nightingale and the other depicts the Virgin Mary with St John.

=== St Alphege ===
- Location: Solihull, Warwickshire

Townshend and Howson were responsible for a two light window in the St Alphege chapel. It depicts the martyrdom of St Alphege and the procession carrying his coffin into St Paul’s Minster.

=== St Ambrose ===
- Location: Widnes, Borough of Halton.
- Year: 1928

Townshend and Howson completed a three-light window for this church in the town of Widnes, then in Lancashire, now in Cheshire. From a church published article, “A journey around St Ambrose Church”.

“Three magnificent windows; the colour is brilliant in the afternoons of sunny summer days. Samuel Kidd, late of Farnworth, left £ 250 for a memorial window in memory of his wife Eliza who had been a Sunday School teacher for many years. The window was to depict “the woman with a pot of ointment” and lettered, “She hath done what she could." Archbishop Howson’s daughter was asked to submit a design but it was uncertain which window to allocate. A design was approved and the west end was allocated. Miss J. Howson and a Miss C. Townshend worked at a studio in Putney. All three lights were to be used and to be descriptive of the great part played by women in the Lord’s ministry. The centre light was to show Jesus Christ with Mary at his feet, worshipping him and making the declaration “Rabboni”. (Note: Jesus said to her, "Mary." She turned toward him and cried out in Aramaic, "Rabboni!" (which means Teacher)-John 20.verse 16.) Underneath this scene were to have a picture of the three Marys discovering the Risen Lord at the Sepulchre. The other lights were to show the widow’s gift to the Temple treasury. We were to see the joy of Jesus in his face as he looked down at the widow. The Arms of the Diocese of Liverpool which depict shipping and the Liver bird are used as are the arms of the Province of York. Can you see an inscription “Thy word is truth”. There are two more inscriptions. On the left, “She hath done what she could”. On the right, “She cast in all that she had”. In the centre window is the Agnus Dei, a lamb carrying a pennant (the Lamb of God with the banner of Victory). John the Baptist, having baptised Jesus Christ said “Behold the Lamb of God which taketh away the sins of the world”, The dedication reads “To the Glory of God and in loving Memory of Eliza Kidd, for many years a Sunday School teacher in this parish. The Gift of her husband, Samuel Kidd. 1918”.

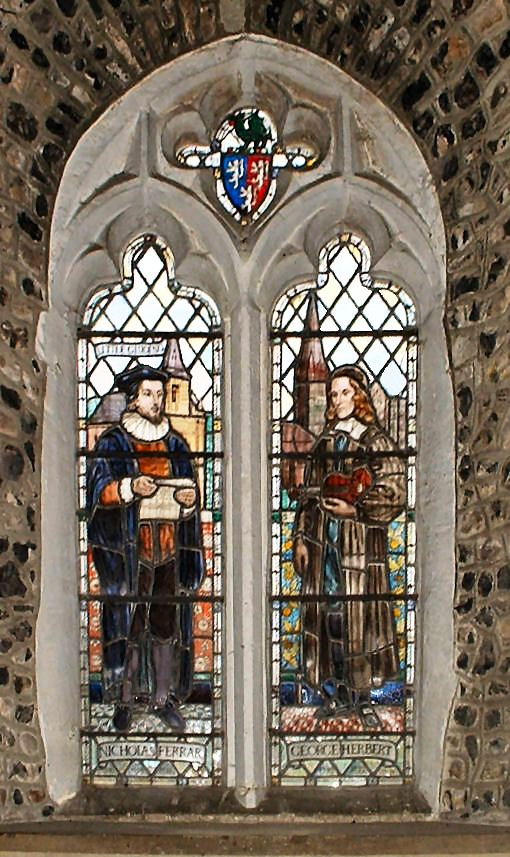
George Herbert window in the Church of St Andrew, Bemerton

=== St Andrew, Bemerton ===
- Location: Bemerton, Wiltshire
- Year: 1934

The Church of St Andrew, Bemerton, is known as George Herbert’s Church. It is in the parish of Bemerton. In George Herbert's day the other little church in the area was St Peter's Fugglestone which now comes within Wilton parish although in Herbert's day there was the one parish of Bemerton-cum-Fugglestone. On 14 June 1934, the stained glass in the West window, which had been given by admirers of George Herbert, from all over the world, was unveiled by the Bishop of Salisbury, Dr. St. Clair Donaldson. It depicts the Poet and his great friend Nicholas Ferrar. Caroline Townshend and Joan Howson were responsible for the window’s design and execution.

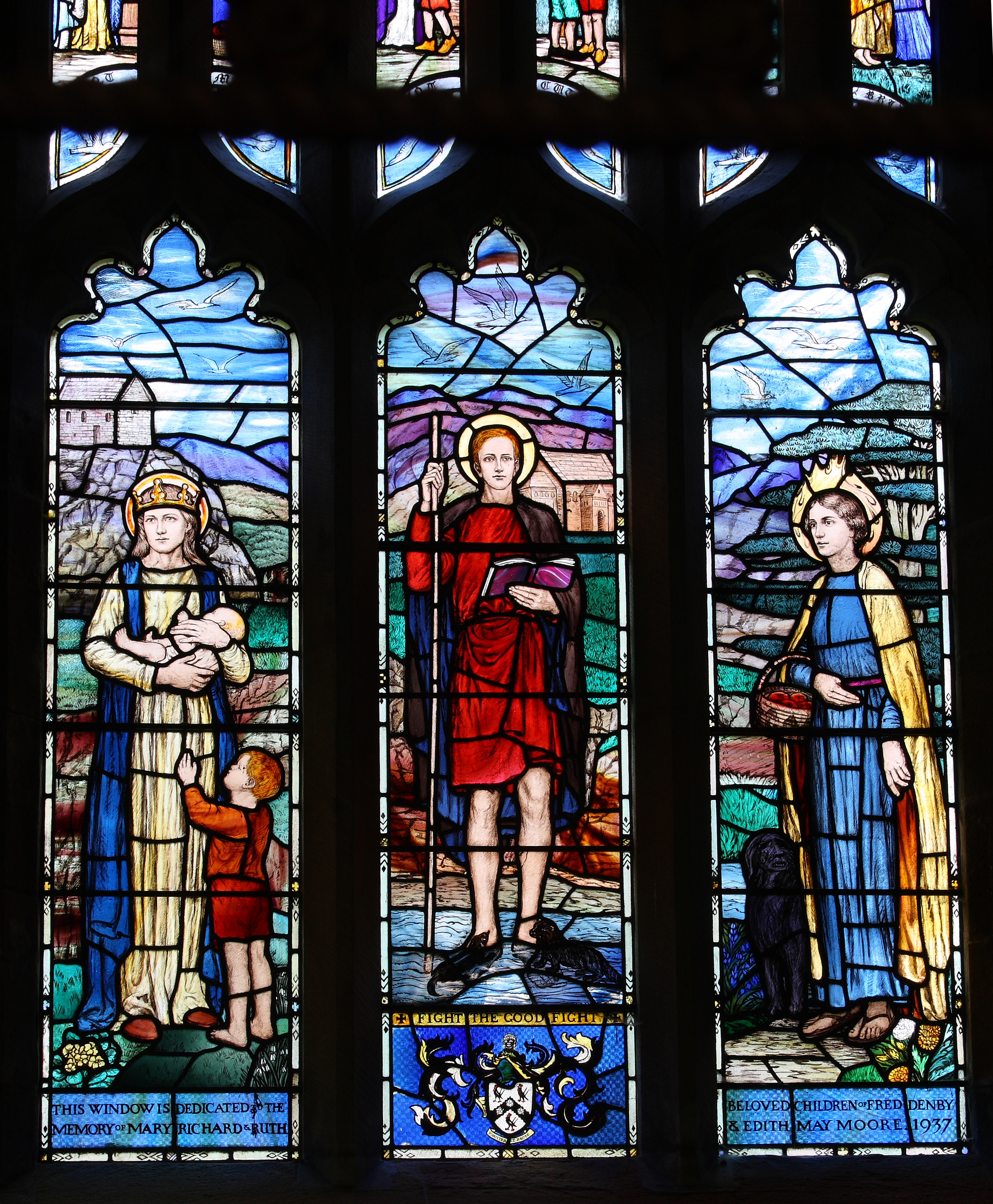
Window in St Andrew Kirkby Malzeard

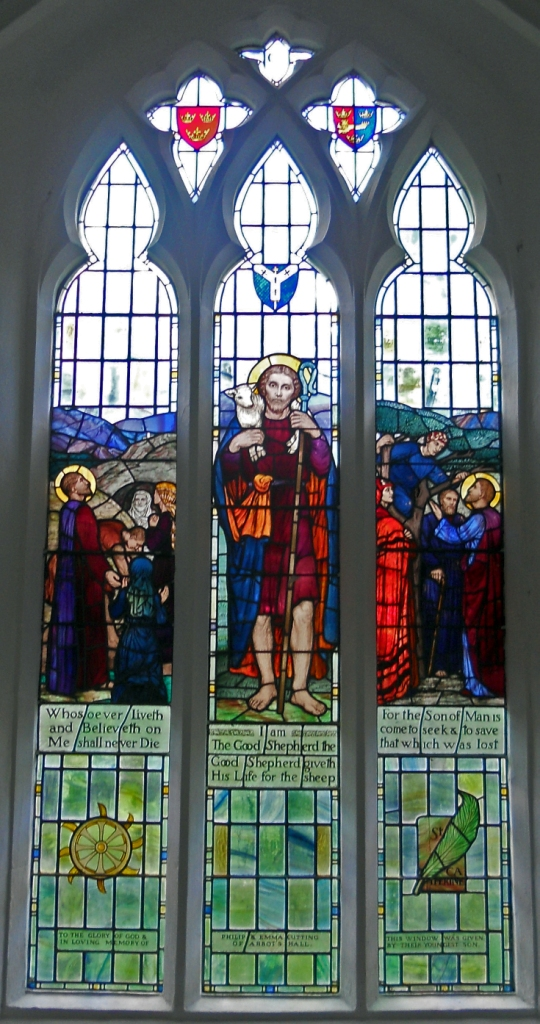
Window in Pettaugh Church

=== St Andrew, Kirkby Malzeard ===
- Location: Kirkby Malzeard, North Yorkshire
- Year: 1937

This church contains a three-light window by Caroline Townshend.

=== St Catherine ===
- Location: Pettaugh, Suffolk
- Year: 1938

Caroline Townshend and Joan Howson were responsible for the East end window in this Church and two small South windows.

=== St Firmin ===
- Location: North Crawley, Buckinghamshire
- Year: 1932

A three-light window in this church is by Townshend and depicts the symbols of Matthew and Luke on the left and Mark and John in the right hand light. In the centre is Christ in Majesty. Below her image of Christ in Majesty, Townshend inscribes the words:

OF THE INCREASE OF HIS GOVERNMENT & PEACE THERE SHALL BE NO END.

=== St John's ===
- Location: Hartland, Devon
- Years 1933

A single Townshend and Howson window was commissioned to the memory of the Wilton family and is set in the centre of the west wall of St John’s Chapel of ease. It represents St Augustine and St Francis.

=== St Leonard, Chelsum ===
- Location: Chelsum, Surrey

In 1939 Townshend and Howson made a south-facing stained glass window of St Leonard and St Francis, which was commissioned as a memorial for H. & M. Daniell. It had 2 lights.

=== St Leonard, Upton ===
- Location: Upton, Gloucestershire

In 1920 Townshend made a "nice Arts & Crafts" window for the North Sanctuary.

=== St Mary, Great Warley ===
- Location: Great Warley

The West rose window in this church was a replacement for one that was blown out in 1940. It is by Heywood Sumner, with contributions from Eric Gill, L. Hallward, Caroline Townshend, William Reynolds-Stephens and Louis Davis. The window itself features hearts, grapes and the names and symbols of the four Evangelists.

=== St Mary, Morpeth ===
- Location: Morpeth, Northumberland

St Mary's is the parish church of Morpeth and has a Townshend and Howson window in the North wall.

=== St Mary, Storrington ===
- Location: Storrington, Sussex
- Year: 1933

Working with Joan Howson, Townshend completed a roundel in the West part of the church. It depicts St Dunstan kneeling in prayer.

=== St Mary the Virgin ===
- Location: Prittlewell, Essex

In the church’s Jesus Chapel South there is a window by Townshend and Howson, this dedicated to J.E. Watts-Ditchfield, the first bishop of Chelmsford who died in 1923.

=== St Michael ===
- Location: Kirby-Le-Soken, Essex
- Years: 1936 and 1948

Townshend and Howson completed two windows for this church. In 1936 they completed a window for the North Aisle area and another in 1948 for the South Aisle West.

=== St Michael and All Angels ===
- Location: Highworth, Wiltshire
- Year: 1937

The five-light East window in this church is by Caroline Townshend and Joan Howson.

=== St Nectan ===
- Location: Stoke, Hartland, Devon
- Years: 1932 and 1933

The Church of Saint Nectan is the parish church of Hartland in Devon and is sometimes referred to as the “Cathedral of North Devon”. It is located in the hamlet of Stoke, west of the town of Hartland. Townshend and Howson produced six windows for the church, all of which highlight the history and national connection of the parish rather than the religious life of the community.

One window, a three-light traceried window, is known as the “Gytha window.” Countess Gytha was a woman of some importance in Saxon England. She was married to Earl Godwin and they and their children held substantial power. She is credited with establishing a religious house at Stoke St Nectan (Nistenstok) and it is from this that the later Abbey grew. Gytha features in the centre light, holding her Abbey in her hands and in the light to her left are the Arms of the Dynhams, who were the owners of the parish & Hundred, showing the “Garter” belt and the seal of John Dynham, 1st Baron Dynham. In the right hand light are the Arms of Hartland Abbey and below Gytha is the seal of Lord Dynham.

The next Townshend and Howson window is known as the 'Armorial' window and illustrates the armorial insignia of the owners of the Manors within the parish of Hartland. The Abbot, Luttrell and Orchard arms are sequential as owners of Hartland Abbey from the Dissolution. The arms of Docton of Docton, Hartland, are representing the Manor of Southole. There are no arms shown for the Waddon-Martyn family who were owners of Milford and Meddon as they were in dispute with the then owners of Hartland Manor and were therefore left off for political reasons.

The next Townshend and Howson window is known as the “King Alfred Window”. Hartland was held by the Saxon Royal Family and is mentioned in King Alfred’s will. This is another three-light traceried window with Alfred in the centre light. In the lights on either side are illustrations of Alfred’s achievements or events which are associated with him. We see the burning of the cakes, the candle clock, the Anglo Saxon Chronicle and the translation of Boethius.

Another window is the “King William Window” which shows the Coronation of King William who became the owner of Hartland following the Conquest. In the centre light of the three-light traceried window is King William and in the left and right hand lights are depictions of the invasion force, the Domesday Book and King William’s Royal Seal.

The “King Arthur Window” celebrates King Arthur and the Holy Grail. The Holy Grail is shown as a chalice, there is a depiction of Sarras, the City of the Grail, the alleged finding of the cross at Glastonbury, the sword Excalibur, the Thorn of Glastonbury and some Cornish Choughs, the symbol of Cornwall. The image of Arthur is based on the statue of Emperor Maximillion at Innsbruck.

The final Townshend and Howson window at St Nectan's is rather plain. A recovered piece of medieval glass from the east window was repaired and presented as a roundel. This has been incorporated as a central feature in the Mary Chapel window and Townshend and Howson then added a further two roundels based on designs of the medieval period, then on display in a London Museum. Some other minor decoration is within the window including stars and crowns.

A further Townshend & Howson window at Hartland exists within the Chapel of Ease off the Square in the town centre. This was commissioned in 1933 by a local schoolteacher Francis James 'Daddy' Wilton and Richard Pearse Chope acted as an intermediary over the chosen design. The design is framed around an image of St Augustine holding a scroll and stood by a fig tree and the figure of St Francis. Below each figure are the arms of Hartland Abbey and that of Canterbury. Other symbolism is included within the design. The cost being agreed at £56 including fixing.

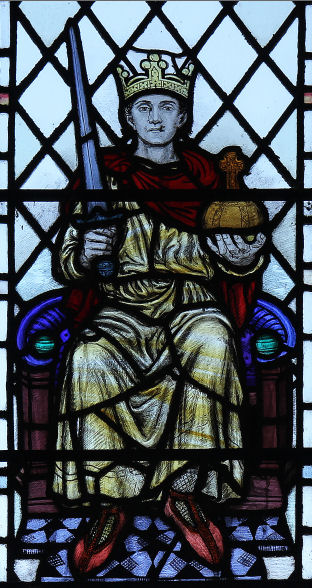
King William

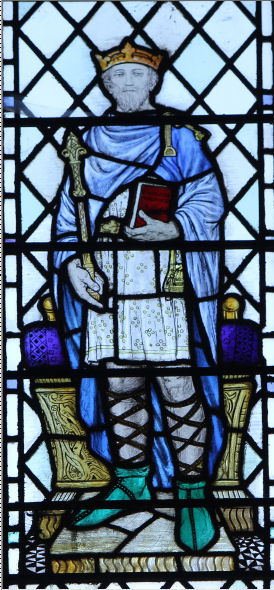
King Alfred

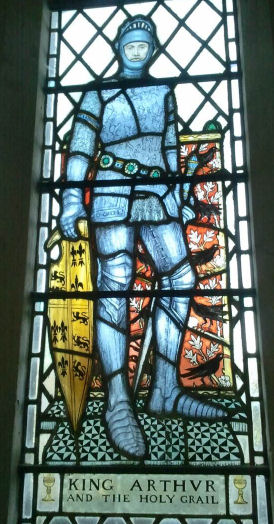
King Arthur

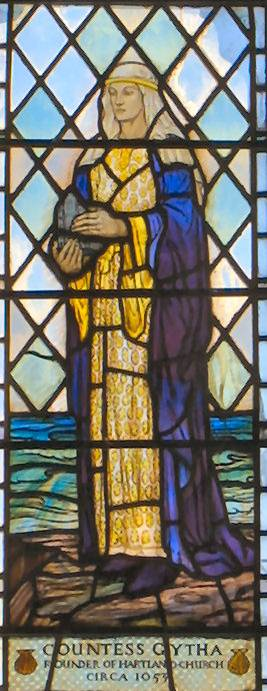
Countess Gytha

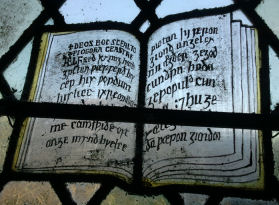
Anglo-Saxon Chronicles

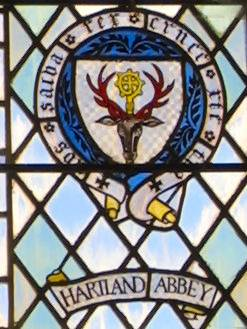
The Arms of Hartland Abbey

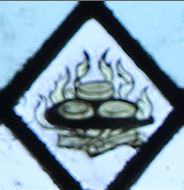
Alfred's cakes burn

=== St Oswald ===
- Location: Burneside, Cumbria
- Year: 1936

A five-light East window depicts scenes from the lives of St Oswald, St Mary, St John and St Kentigern. Described by Matthew Hyde and Nikolaus Pevsner as a "Good East window of 1936".

=== St Peter and St Paul ===
- Location: Rustington, Sussex
- Year: 1924- 27

Townshend and Howson completed the first to third windows in the North and West of the church.
