= Havant Cricket Club =

Coordinates: 50°51′14.03″N 00°59′02.57″W

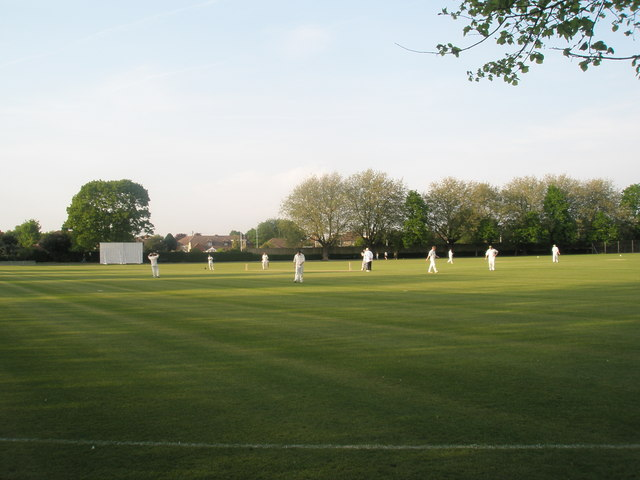

Personnel
- Captain: (England) Chris Morgan
- Coach: (England) Craig Stainton

Team information
- Founded: 1888
- Home ground: Havant Park
- Official website: Havant Cricket Club

Havant Cricket Club is an amateur cricket club based at Havant, Hampshire. The club's first team plays in the Southern Premier Cricket League, which is one of the ECB Premier Leagues that are the highest level of the amateur, recreational sport in England and Wales.

The club, founded in 1882, currently plays its home games at Havant Park, which has also hosted Hampshire Second XI matches.

In 2005 Havant reached the semi-finals of the Cockspur Cup, after beating Bridgwater Cricket Club of Somerset. Havant have been champions in the Southern Premier Cricket League in 2000, 2002, 2007, 2008, 2009, 2011 and most recently in 2016. In 2011 and 2016, the club also won the league's Twenty20 competition. They were beaten finalists in 2012.
