= George Herbert at Bemerton =

Painting by William Dyce

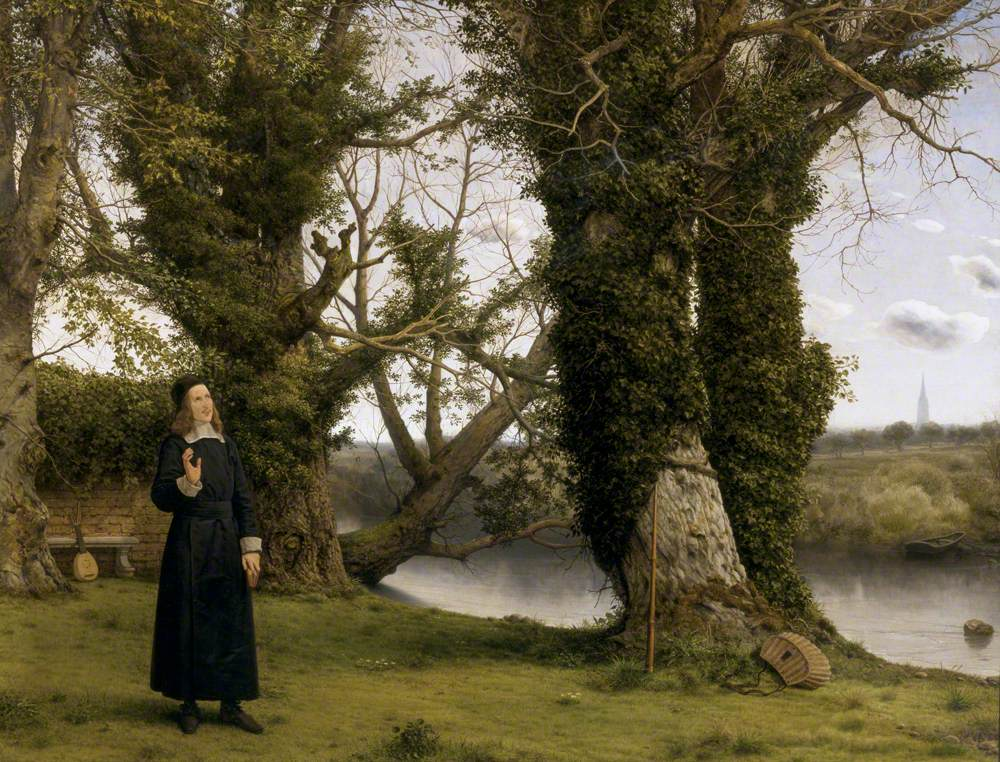
- Artist: William Dyce
- Year: 1860
- Type: Oil on canvas, history painting
- Dimensions: 86 cm × 112 cm (34 in × 44 in)
- Location: Guildhall Art Gallery, London

George Herbert at Bemerton is an 1860 oil painting by the British artist William Dyce. A history painting it depicts the English poet and clergyman George Herbert of the early seventeenth century. He is shown standing contemplatively in a cassock in the rectory grounds of his parish in Bemerton in Wiltshire by the River Nadder. The spire of Salisbury Cathedral can be seen in the distance. Other visual nods are made to Bemerton's life are made by the lute and fishing rod, the latter a reference to the fact that Izaak Walton the author of The Compleat Angler had been his first biographer.

The painting was displayed at the Royal Academy Exhibition of 1861 held at the National Gallery in London. It was subsequently as acquired by the art collector Charles Gassiot, who in 1902 left it to the Guildhall Art Gallery in the City of London.

== Bibliography ==
- Alun-Jones, Deborah. The Wry Romance of the Literary Rectory. Thames and Hudson Limited, 2013.
- Pointon, Marcia R. William Dyce, 1806-1864: A Critical Biography. Oxford University Press, 1979.
- Herrmann, Luke. Nineteenth Century British Painting. Charles de la Mare, 2000.
- Roe, Sonia & Oil Paintings in Public Ownership in the City of London of London. Public Catalogue Foundation, 2009.
- Strong, Roy. Painting the Past: The Victorian Painter and British History. Pimlico, 2004.
