= Old Town Hall, Wilton =

Municipal building in Wilton, Wiltshire, England

Old Town Hall
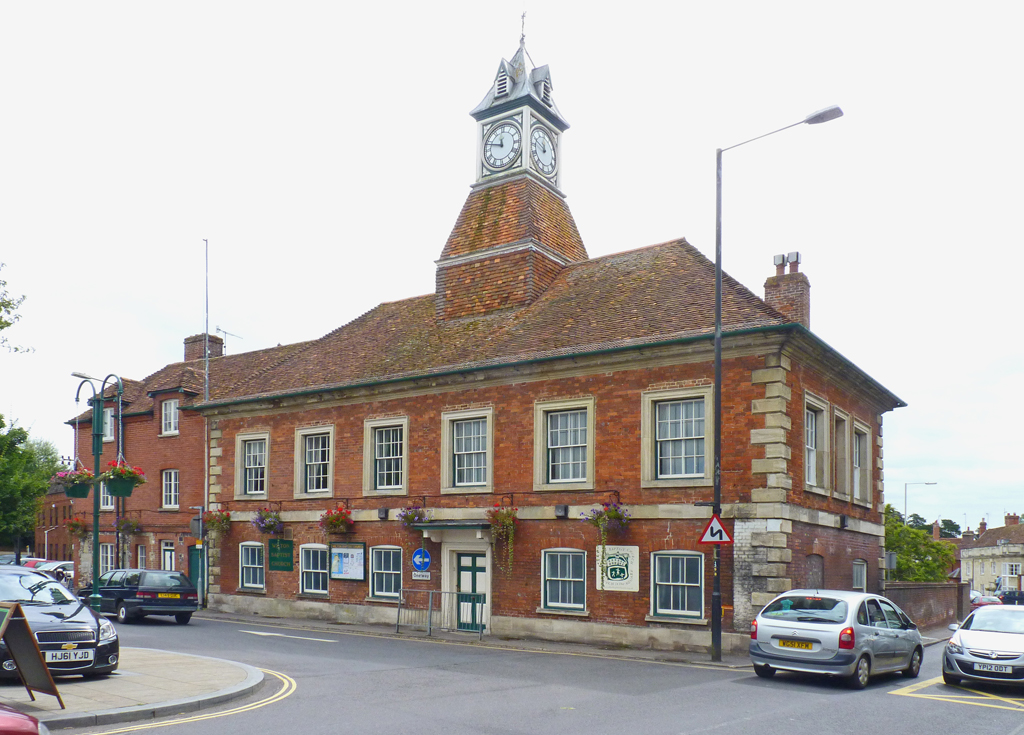
- Old Town Hall, Wilton

- Shown in Wiltshire
- 51.0798°N 1.8632°W
- Location: Market Place, Wilton

History
- Built: 1738

Site notes
- Architectural style: Neoclassical style

Listed Building – Grade II
- Official name: Market Hall
- Designated: 8 June 1978
- Reference no.: 1023717

The Old Town Hall is a municipal building in the Market Place in Wilton, Wiltshire, England. The structure, which is currently used as a Baptist church, is a Grade II listed building.

== History ==
The first municipal building in the town was an ancient guildhall, which stood on the east side of Market Place; it was a two-storey building with shops on the ground floor and an assembly room on the first floor. The assembly room was accessed using an external staircase on the north side. In the 1730s, after the guildhall became dilapidated, borough officials decided to demolish the old building and to build a new structure on the same site.

The new building was designed in the neoclassical style, built in red brick with stone dressings and was completed in 1738. The design involved a symmetrical main frontage with six bays facing onto Market Place; there was a doorway with a wooden surround and a cornice in the third bay from the right; the other bays on the ground floor contained segmental openings while the first floor was fenestrated by sash windows with architraves. At the roof level there was a moulded stone cornice.

The borough council, which had met in the town hall, was reformed under the Municipal Corporations Act 1883. A clock tower with a pyramid-shaped dome was added in 1889. The architectural historian, Nikolaus Pevsner, described the building as "quite insignificant" in relation to the other town halls in Wiltshire.

In the late 19th century, the town hall was the venue for local classes in science and art and, during the First World War, it was requisitioned for military use with courts martial being held there. It also served as a community events venue with organisations such as the Wiltshire Archaeological and Natural History Society holding its annual meetings there. Meanwhile, offices for council officers and their departments were established in Kingsbury Square.

The town hall continued to serve as a meeting place for the borough council for much of the 20th century, but ceased to be the local seat of government when the enlarged Salisbury District Council was formed in 1974. It was subsequently acquired by the local Baptist minister, the Reverend Oliver Vellacott, refurbished and then re-opened as a Baptist church in 1981.
