= Netherhampton =

Village in Wiltshire, England

Coordinates: 51.067°N 1.845°W

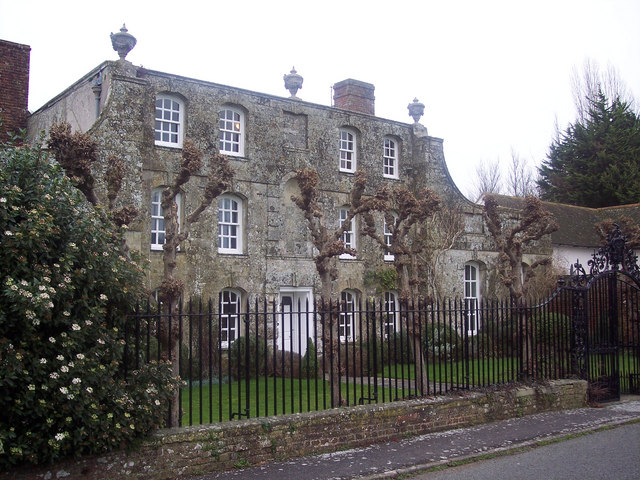
- Netherhampton House

- Location within Wiltshire
- Population: 493 (in 2011)
- OS grid reference: SU110298
- Civil parish: Netherhampton
- Unitary authority: Wiltshire
- Ceremonial county: Wiltshire
- Region: South West
- Country: England
- Sovereign state: United Kingdom
- Post town: Salisbury
- Postcode district: SP2
- Dialling code: 01722
- Police: Wiltshire
- Fire: Dorset and Wiltshire
- Ambulance: South Western
- UK Parliament: Salisbury
- Website: Parish Council

Netherhampton is a village and civil parish in Wiltshire, England, immediately west of the city of Salisbury. The village is about 2 miles (3.2 km) from the city centre.

== History ==
In 1993 the Salisbury Hoard was excavated within the parish. These Bronze Age and Iron Age objects are the largest group of prehistoric metal objects ever found in Britain. Many were illicitly dug before being acquired by the British Museum in 1998.

Netherhampton House has a central position in the village. It was built in the 17th century for the Wilton Estate and is Grade II* listed.

The village lies on a road which was previously the B3094 and linked the southeast of Salisbury (and main routes further south) with Wilton and the main route to the northwest. The Shell Guide of 1968 describes the church as "dangerously close to the busy main road". When this road was upgraded to the A3094, a half-mile section was built on a straighter alignment in order to bypass the village to the south.

== Parish church ==
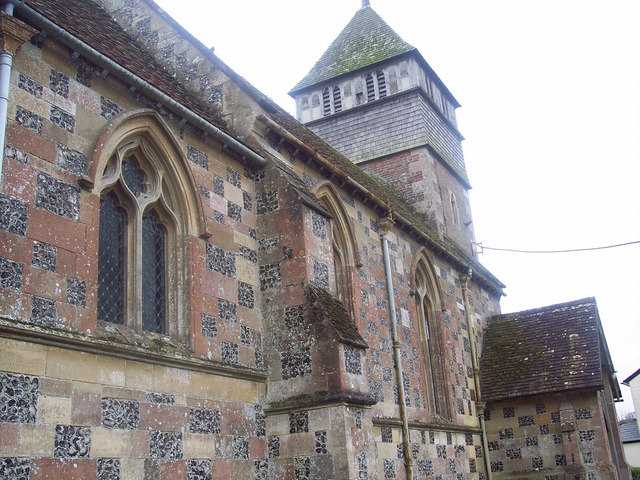
St Catherine's Church

There was a chapel at Netherhampton in 1564, when its parish was united with Wilton.

The church of St Catherine was rebuilt, except for its 18th-century tower, in 1876–7 by William Butterfield. The tower is in Flemish bond brick with a shingled roof, while the rest is built in limestone and flint chequers under a tiled roof. Inside, the pews and octagonal stone font are by Butterworth, and the east window is by Gibbs.

Since 1972 the parish name has been Wilton with Netherhampton and Fugglestone.

== Geography ==
The northern part of the parish has water meadows and the River Nadder. The village is bypassed by the A3094 road which links Quidhampton with Harnham, providing a southwestern ring road for Salisbury. Unlike the rest of the Salisbury ring road that is formed of the A36, the A3094 runs through the outer suburbs of Salisbury rather than encircling the city centre. To the west the parish borders the Wilton House estate.

To the east was the ancient parish of West Harnham, separated from Netherhampton by the route of a Roman road. When West Harnham parish was abolished in 1934, its land outside the Salisbury built-up area was transferred to Netherhampton. In 1954 the urban boundary was extended to bring the expanded built-up area into Salisbury; since then development has spread further into Netherhampton parish, bringing housing and a business park. The southern part of the parish has farmland.

== Amenities ==
The village pub, the Victoria and Albert, is a 17th-century cottage extended in the 18th. To the south of the village are a golf club (Salisbury and South Wilts), a garden centre and Salisbury Racecourse.
