= Quidhampton, Wiltshire =

Village in Wiltshire, England

Coordinates: 51.079°N 1.840°W

Quidhampton
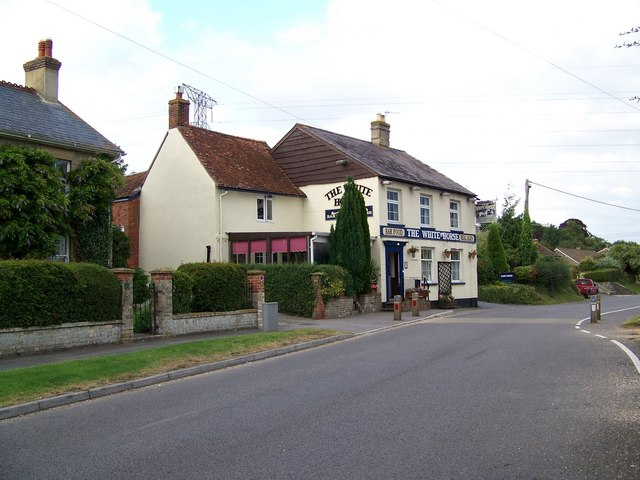
- The White Horse, Quidhampton

- Location within Wiltshire
- Population: 408 (in 2011)
- OS grid reference: SU113311
- Civil parish: Quidhampton
- Unitary authority: Wiltshire
- Ceremonial county: Wiltshire
- Region: South West
- Country: England
- Sovereign state: United Kingdom
- Post town: Salisbury
- Postcode district: SP2
- Dialling code: 01722
- Police: Wiltshire
- Fire: Dorset and Wiltshire
- Ambulance: South Western
- UK Parliament: Salisbury
- Website: Parish Council

Quidhampton is a village and civil parish in Wiltshire, England. It forms part of the Salisbury urban area and is around 2 miles (3.2 km) west of the city centre. The parish adjoins Wilton to the west, Salisbury to the north and east, and Netherhampton to the south. The village is on the River Nadder and is close to the A36 road between Salisbury and Wilton.

The name Quidhampton probably means "muddy home farm" or "home farm with good manure", from the Old English cwéad (dung, dirt) + hām-tūn.

== Geography ==
Quidhampton is on low-lying land between Salisbury and Wilton, close to the A36 road. The parish is a narrow strip between the Rivers Nadder and Wylye and consists of watermeadows and marshland, known as the Great Marsh. Much of this marsh was included in the park around Wilton House when it was enclosed, and the remaining land is mostly used for arable cropping. In the eighteenth century there was a gravel pit in the parish, and many old chalk pits. The roads had to be rerouted when Wilton Park was formed, and are mostly straight and lined with trees planted at the time.

== Local government ==
The civil parish elects a parish council. It is in the area of Wiltshire Council unitary authority, which is responsible for all significant local government functions. Until 1894, Quidhampton was a tithing of Fugglestone St Peter, and it then formed part of the new parish of Bemerton until it was established as a parish in its own right in 1934.

== Notable landmarks ==
There is a pub, the White Horse, and a village hall.

Quidhampton has no church. For Church of England purposes it is part of Bemerton parish.

The chalk pit known as Quidhampton Quarry is outside the parish, to the north of the A36. It is owned by Imerys and produced chalk and china clay until its closure in 2009. The abandoned quarry has been described as a "derelict and ugly site", and in 2016 there are plans to fill it with imported recycled aggregate and level the site to remove the eyesore.

== Notable people ==
- Simon Forman, a 16th and 17th century astrologer, was born at Quidhampton in 1552.
