= Wilton, Wiltshire =

Town and civil parish in Wiltshire, England

Coordinates: 51.080°N 1.864°W

Wilton
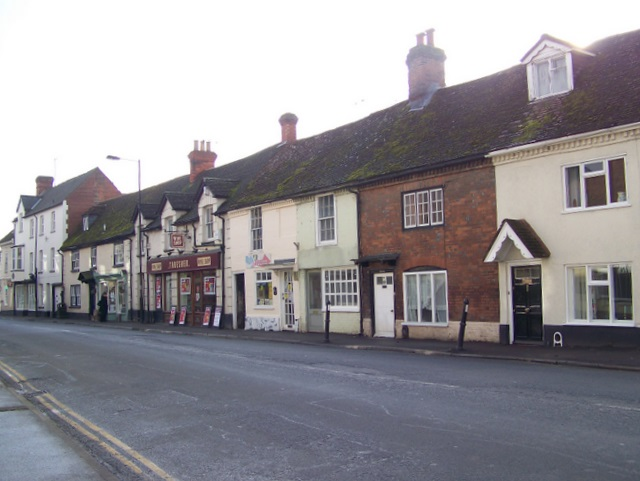
- Houses on West Street (A30), Wilton

- Location within Wiltshire
- Population: 4,305 (2021)
- OS grid reference: SU096312
- Civil parish: Wilton
- Unitary authority: Wiltshire
- Ceremonial county: Wiltshire
- Region: South West
- Country: England
- Sovereign state: United Kingdom
- Post town: Salisbury
- Postcode district: SP2
- Dialling code: 01722
- Police: Wiltshire
- Fire: Dorset and Wiltshire
- Ambulance: South Western
- UK Parliament: Salisbury
- Website: Town Council

Wilton is a town and civil parish in Wiltshire, England. Lying about 3 miles (5 km) west of the city of Salisbury, and until 1889 the county town of Wiltshire, it has a rich heritage dating back to the Anglo-Saxons. The parish had a population of 4,305 at the 2021 census, an increase from the 3,579 recorded in 2011.

Carpets have been manufactured at Wilton since the 18th century. The town is home to Wilton House, country seat of the Earls of Pembroke, and has a large Romanesque Revival parish church. The rivers Wylye and Nadder meet at Wilton.

== History ==
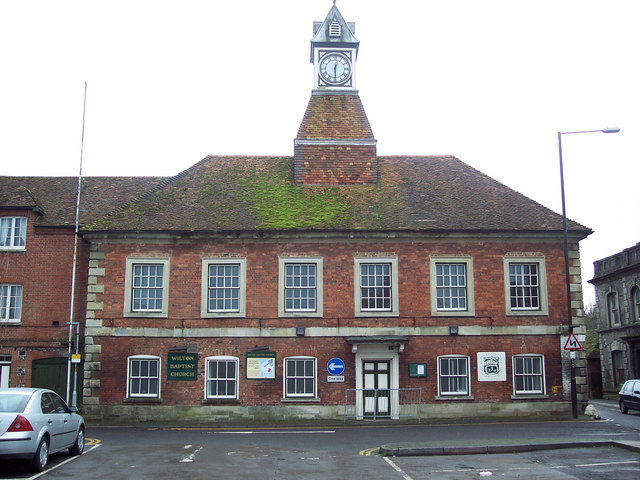
The Old Town Hall

The history of Wilton dates back to the Anglo-Saxons in the 8th century, and by the late 9th century it was the capital of Wiltunscire, a shire of the Kingdom of Wessex. It remained the administrative centre of Wiltshire until the 11th century. Wilton was of significant importance to the church, with the founding of Wilton Abbey in 771 amongst other establishments. In 871 Alfred the Great fought and lost an important battle here against the Danish armies, leaving him in retreat for several years.

Despite further attacks, Wilton remained a prosperous town, as recorded in the 11th-century Domesday Book. The building of Salisbury Cathedral nearby, however, caused Wilton's decline, as the new site of Salisbury, with a new bridge over the River Avon, provided a convenient bypass around Wilton on the trade routes.

Wilton Abbey was surrendered to Henry VIII in 1539 during the Dissolution of the Monasteries, and in 1541 much of the estate was granted to William Herbert, 1st Earl of Pembroke, who began to build Wilton House.

An outbreak of smallpox in 1737 killed 132 people. The Old Town Hall was completed in 1738.

Wilton was anciently the seat of the county court, and for parliamentary elections it was the venue for elections of county members until the Wiltshire seat was abolished in 1832. On the formation of Wiltshire County Council in 1889, Wilton lost its role as county town to Trowbridge, which could be more easily reached by rail from all parts of the county.

== Economy ==
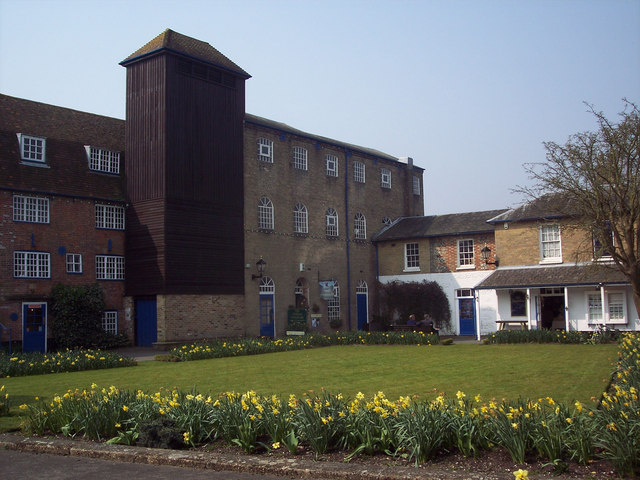
The Old Courtyard, Wilton Shopping Village: part of the former Wilton carpet factory site now used as a shopping outlet

By the 17th century, weaving had become a busy trade, and the carpet industry began in 1741 when two French weavers were brought in by Henry Herbert, 9th Earl of Pembroke to teach the local people new skills. Carpet weaving prospered until 1815, when peace following the Napoleonic Wars introduced European competition. Machinery to produce Axminster carpets was installed in 1835. The Wilton Royal Carpet Factory was founded at the turn of the century, with the help of the then Lord Pembroke, to rescue the previous carpet factory that had fallen into financial difficulty. The factory continued to operate until 1995, when it closed temporarily after a takeover before re-opening under another name. Today the site is used as a shopping outlet.

== Transport ==
The arrival of the railways led to increased prosperity. Wilton once had two railway stations: the first (later known as Wilton North) opened by the Great Western Railway in 1856 on their line from Westbury to Salisbury; the second (later known as Wilton South) by the Salisbury and Yeovil Railway in 1859 on the West of England line from London Waterloo to Exeter. The stations closed in 1955 and 1966 respectively, although the lines remain open; the nearest station is now at Salisbury.

Public transport access to Wilton is now provided by several bus routes operated by Go South Coast under the Salisbury Reds brand, which ply between Salisbury and several places west of Wilton. A dedicated Park & Ride service operates from the car park between Kingsway and The Avenue, towards Salisbury city centre.

== Media ==
Local TV coverage is provided by BBC South and ITV Meridian. Television signals are received from the Salisbury and Rowridge TV transmitters. Local radio stations are BBC Radio Wiltshire on 103.5 FM and Greatest Hits Radio South (formerly Spire FM) on 102 FM. The town is served by the local newspaper, Salisbury Journal.

== Military connections ==
The headquarters of Land Forces (and predecessors) was at Erskine Barracks, northeast of Wilton, from 1949 to 2010. After the headquarters moved to Marlborough Lines near Andover the site was sold for housing.

== Governance ==
The boundaries of the modern civil parish originate with the Borough of Wilton, defined in 1885. The parish includes the villages of Bulbridge and Ditchampton. In 1894 Wilton absorbed the western part of the neighbouring parish of Fugglestone St Peter, the rest going into a new parish of Bemerton.

The parish elects a town council. It is in the area of Wiltshire Council unitary authority, which is responsible for all significant local government functions. As of 2021, Wilton is in the 'Wilton' electoral division, which also includes nearby Quidhampton and Netherhampton. The total division population taken at the 2011 census was 4,806.

== Parish church ==
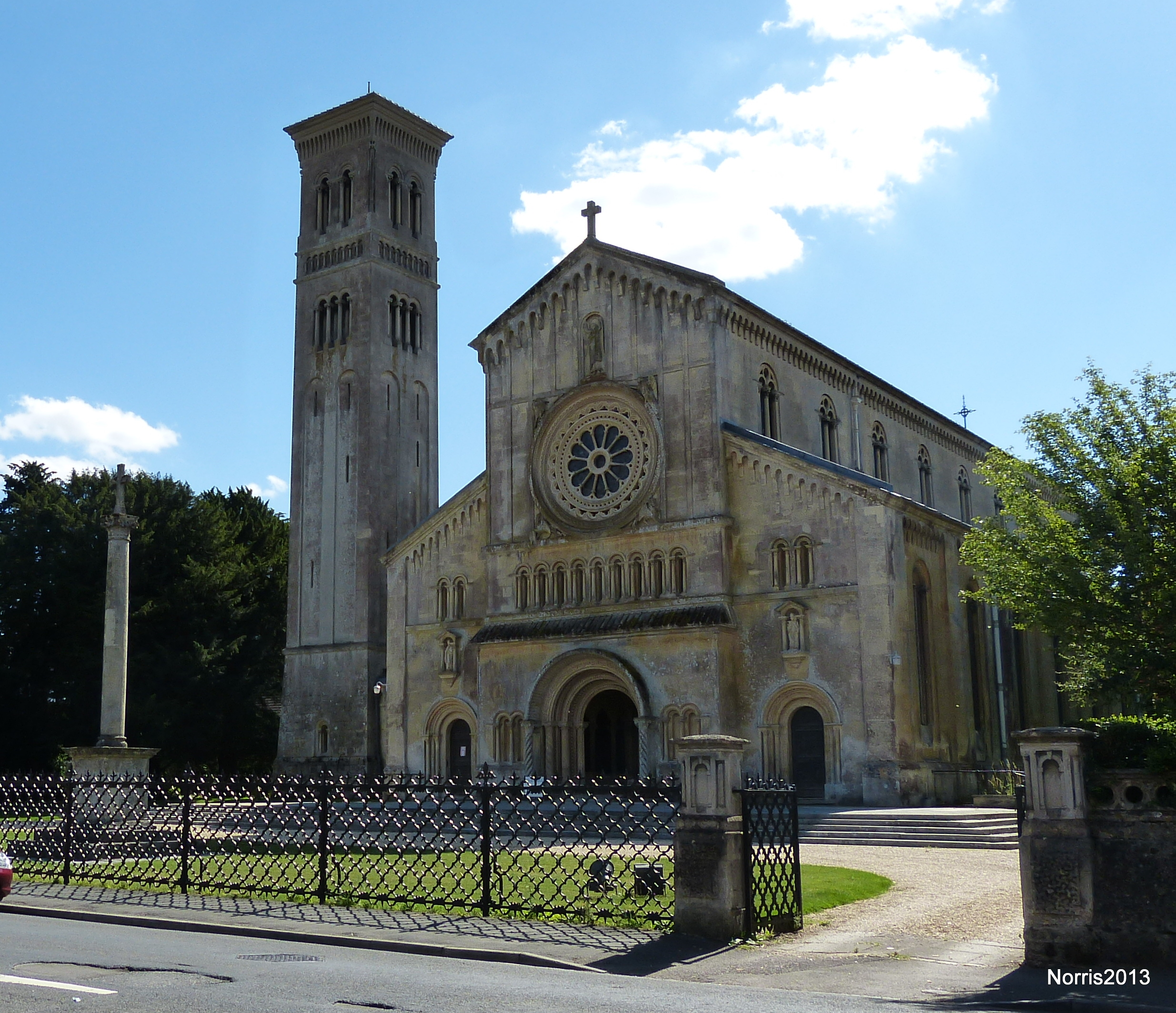
St Mary and St Nicholas' parish church

The Grade I listed Church of St Mary and St Nicholas was built as a replacement for St Mary's Church between 1841 and 1844 at the instigation of Catherine Herbert, Countess of Pembroke (the daughter of Semyon Vorontsov, Russian ambassador to Britain) and her younger son Sidney Herbert. It was designed by the architect Thomas Henry Wyatt in Romanesque Revival style with considerable Byzantine influences, and includes a 105 ft (32 m) campanile.

The church's unusually large size for the community it serves reflects the wealth of its original benefactors. Many of the materials used in its construction were imported from continental Europe, including marble columns from Italy and 12th and 13th century stained glass from France.

== Notable people ==
- Dudley Cockle (1907–1986), cricketer
- Edith Olivier (1872–1948), first woman mayor of Wilton, writer
- Sydney Olivier (1870–1932), cricketer
- Edward Slow (1841–1925), poet and carriage builder
- A. G. Street, country author, farmed at Ditchampton Farm
