= Southern Premier Cricket League =

EBC Premier League

- Southern Premier Cricket League
- Countries: England
- Administrator: Hampshire Cricket Board
- Format: Limited Overs
- First edition: 1969 (Originally Founded); 2000 (ECB Premier League)
- Tournament format: League
- Number of teams: 10 (ECB Premier Division)
- Current champion: St Cross Symondians CC
- Most successful: Havant CC (14 titles)
- Relegation to: Division One
- Website: https://www.southernpremierleague.co.uk/

The Southern Premier Cricket League is the top level of competition for recreational club cricket in central southern England. The League was founded in 1969 under the name Southern Cricket League, and in 2000 it adopted the name Southern Premier Cricket League when it became an ECB Premier League.

The league primarily covers Hampshire, but also has clubs from Dorset, Isle of Wight, Surrey, West Sussex, and Wiltshire. In the past there have also been clubs from Berkshire.

The league runs a Premier Division, Division One, Division Two and a Division Three. Relegated teams from Division Three are relegated into the Hampshire Cricket League.

== Champions ==
=== ECB Premier Division ===
- League Champions 1969–1988
  Year	Club
  1969	Trojans
  1970	Old Tauntonians
  1971	The Deanery
  1972	Old Tauntonians
  1973	Old Tauntonians
  1974	The Deanery
  1975	Havant
  1976	Havant
  1977	The Deanery
  1978	Havant
  1979	The Deanery
  1980	Havant
  1981	The Deanery
  1982	The Deanery
  1983	Lymington
  1984	Bournemouth
  1985	Lymington
  1986	South Hants Touring Club
  1987	South Hants Touring Club
  1988	Winchester
- League Champions 1989–2008
  Year	Club
  1989	Old Tauntonians
  1990	South Wilts
  1991	Havant
  1992	Hursley Park
  1993	Portsmouth
  1994	United Services Portsmouth
  1995	Winchester Krakatoa Simmarians
  1996	Bournemouth
  1997	Havant
  1998	Hungerford
  1999	Hungerford
  2000	Havant
  2001	BAT Sports
  2002	Havant
  2003	BAT Sports
  2004	South Wilts
  2005	BAT Sports
  2006	BAT Sports
  2007	Havant
  2008	Havant
- League Champions 2009–present
  Year	Club
  2009	Havant
  2010	Bournemouth
  2011	Havant
  2012	South Wilts
  2013	South Wilts
  2014	South Wilts
  2015	South Wilts
  2016	Havant
  2017	Havant
  2018	St Cross Symondians
  2019	Bashley (Rydal)
  2020	no competition
  2021	South Wilts
  2022	St Cross Symondians
  2023	Burridge
  2024	Hampshire Academy
  2025	St Cross Symondians
  2026	St Cross Symondians

=== Championships won ===
- ECB Premier Division Champions
  Wins	Club
  14	Havant
  7	South Wilts
  6	The Deanery
  4	BAT Sports/Totton and Eling
  4	Old Tauntonians
  4	St Cross Symondians
  3	Bournemouth
  2	Hungerford
  2	Lymington
  2	South Hants Touring Club
  1	Bashley (Rydal)
  1	Burridge
  1	Hampshire Academy
  1	Hursley Park
  1	Portsmouth
  1	Trojans
  1	United Services Portsmouth
  1	Winchester
  1	Winchester Krakatoa Simmarians

== ECB Premier Division Performance by season from 2000 ==
Key
Gold	Champions
Blue	Left League
Red	Relegated

Performance by season, from 2000
Club	2000	2001	2002	2003	2004	2005	2006	2007	2008	2009	2010	2011	2012	2013	2014	2015	2016	2017	2018	2019	2021	2022	2023	2024	2025	2026
Alton							9	7	9	6	7	6	5	9	3	8	6	9	9	8	10		9	7	2	9
Andover (Note: Andover were relegated in 2005 because their ground failed to meet league requirements.)	4	8	8	7	8	9			6	10		10						10								
Bashley (Rydal)	7	3	3	5	5	5	2	6	7	7	5	9	2	3	6	3	3	2	7	1	4	4	8	2	5	10
Basingstoke and North Hants																			4	10				8	10	
Bournemouth	5	5	5	2	6	3	5	4	5	5	1	2	10	10						9	3	7	7	6	9	3
Burridge	9	7	10												8	9	2	6	2	6	8	9	1	9	7	6
Calmore Sports	2	4	9	10																						
Cove	10																									
Hampshire Academy				3	4	7	7	2	4	4	2	5	9	5	4	4	9	8	3	5	5	2	4	1	4	5
Havant	1	2	1	4	2	6	3	1	1	1	8	1	3	2	2	2	1	1	6	7	6	5	6	10		
Hook & Newnham Basics																					7	10				
Hungerford	8	10																								
Hursley Park						10	8	9	10																	
Liphook and Ripsley		9	6	8	9	8	10																			
Lymington										8	9	7	6	6	7	5	5	4	8	4	9	6	5	5	3	8
New Milton																	7	7	10							
Old Tauntonians and Romsey					10																					
Portsmouth			7	9	7	4	6	10																	6	4
St Cross Symondians								5	8	9	6	4	4	8	9	6	8	5	1	2	2	1	3	4	1	1
Sarisbury Athletic																10										7
South Wilts	6	6	4	6	1	2	4	8	2	2	3	3	1	1	1	1	4	3	5	3	1	3	2	3	8	2
Totton and Eling (Note: Totton and Eling were called BAT Sports until after the 2006 season.)	3	1	2	1	3	1	1	3	3	3	4	8	7	7	10							8	10			
Ventnor											10		8	4	5	7	10									
References																										
