= List of acts of the Parliament of Great Britain from 1762 =

This is a complete list of acts of the Parliament of Great Britain for the year 1762.

For acts passed until 1707, see the list of acts of the Parliament of England and the list of acts of the Parliament of Scotland. See also the list of acts of the Parliament of Ireland.

For acts passed from 1801 onwards, see the list of acts of the Parliament of the United Kingdom. For acts of the devolved parliaments and assemblies in the United Kingdom, see the list of acts of the Scottish Parliament, the list of acts of the Northern Ireland Assembly, and the list of acts and measures of Senedd Cymru; see also the list of acts of the Parliament of Northern Ireland.

The number shown after each act's title is its chapter number. Acts are cited using this number, preceded by the year(s) of the reign during which the relevant parliamentary session was held; thus the Union with Ireland Act 1800 is cited as "39 & 40 Geo. 3. c. 67", meaning the 67th act passed during the session that started in the 39th year of the reign of George III and which finished in the 40th year of that reign. Note that the modern convention is to use Arabic numerals in citations (thus "41 Geo. 3" rather than "41 Geo. III"). Acts of the last session of the Parliament of Great Britain and the first session of the Parliament of the United Kingdom are both cited as "41 Geo. 3".

Acts passed by the Parliament of Great Britain did not have a short title; however, some of these acts have subsequently been given a short title by acts of the Parliament of the United Kingdom (such as the Short Titles Act 1896).

Before the Acts of Parliament (Commencement) Act 1793 came into force on 8 April 1793, acts passed by the Parliament of Great Britain were deemed to have come into effect on the first day of the session in which they were passed. Because of this, the years given in the list below may in fact be the year before a particular act was passed.

== 2 Geo. 3 ==
Continuing the first session of the 12th Parliament of Great Britain, which met from 3 November 1761 until 2 June 1762.

=== Public acts ===
Short title	Citation	Royal assent
Long title
Fish Carriage Act 1762 (repealed)	2 Geo. 3. c. 15	8 April 1762
An Act for the better supplying the Cities of London and Westminster with Fish, and to reduce the present exorbitant Price thereof; and to protect and encourage Fishermen. (Repealed by Billingsgate Market Act 1846 (9 & 10 Vict. c. cccxlvi), Sea Fisheries Act 1868 (31 & 32 Vict. c. 45) and Statute Law Revision Act 1948 (11 & 12 Geo. 6. c. 62))
Navy Act 1762 (repealed)	2 Geo. 3. c. 16	8 April 1762
An Act for the Encouragement of Seamen, and the more speedy and effectual manning His Majesty's Navy. (Repealed by Naval Prize Acts Repeal Act 1864 (27 & 28 Vict. c. 23))
Crown Lands (Forfeited Estates) Act 1762 (repealed)	2 Geo. 3. c. 17	8 April 1762
An Act for Relief of the Vassals of the several Estates which are, or may be, annexed to the Crown by virtue of an Act passed in the Twenty-fifth Year of the Reign of His late Majesty, (Note: Crown Lands (Forfeited Estates) Act 1751 (25 Geo. 2. c. 41)) and for carrying the Purposes of the said Act more effectually into Execution; and for enforcing and carrying into Execution so much of an Act passed in the First Year of the Reign of His present Majesty, (Note: Supply, etc. (No. 2) Act 1760 (1 Geo. 3. c. 19)) as relates to the paying and discharging the Wadsetts affecting the Estate of Lovat. (Repealed by Statute Law (Repeals) Act 1978 (c. 45))
Discovery of Longitude at Sea Act 1762 (repealed)	2 Geo. 3. c. 18	8 April 1762
An Act for rendering more effectual an Act, made in the Twelfth Year of the Reign of Her late Majesty Queen Anne, intituled, "An Act for providing a Publick Reward for such Person or Persons as shall discover the Longitude at Sea," (Note: Discovery of Longitude at Sea Act 1713 (13 Ann. c. 14)) with regard to the making Experiments of Proposals made for discovering the Longitude. (Repealed by Statute Law Revision Act 1867 (30 & 31 Vict. c. 59))
Game Act 1762 (repealed)	2 Geo. 3. c. 19	8 April 1762
An Act for the better Preservation of the Game in that Part of Great Britain called England. (Repealed by Game Act 1831 (1 & 2 Will. 4. c. 32))
Militia Act 1762 (repealed)	2 Geo. 3. c. 20	8 April 1762
An Act to explain, amend, and reduce into One Act of Parliament, the several Laws now in being, relating to the raising and training the Militia within that Part of Great Britain called England. (Repealed by Statute Law Revision Act 1867 (30 & 31 Vict. c. 59))
London Streets Act 1762 (repealed)	2 Geo. 3. c. 21	2 June 1762
An Act for paving, cleansing, and lighting, the Squares, Streets, and Lanes, within the City and Liberty of Westminster, the Parishes of Saint Giles in the Fields, Saint George the Martyr, Saint George Bloomsbury, that Part of the Parish of Saint Andrew Holbourn which lies in the County of Middlesex, the several Liberties of The Rolls and Savoy, and that Part of the Dutchy of Lancaster which lies in the County of Middlesex; and for preventing Annoyances therein; and for other Purposes therein mentioned. (Repealed by Tothill Fields Improvement Act 1825 (6 Geo. 4. c. cxxxiv) and United Parishes of St. Andrew Holborn above the Bars and St. George the Martyr Improvement Act 1832 (2 & 3 Will. 4. c. lxvi))
Poor Law Act 1762 or the Poor Act 1762 or the Register of Poor Children Act 1762 (repealed)	2 Geo. 3. c. 22	2 June 1762
An Act for the keeping regular, uniform, and annual Registers of all Parish Poor Infants, under a certain Age within the Bills of Mortality. (Repealed by Poor Law Amendment Act 1844 (7 & 8 Vict. c. 101))
Indemnity Act 1762 (repealed)	2 Geo. 3. c. 23	2 June 1762
An Act to indemnify such as have omitted to qualify themselves for Offices and Employments; and to indemnify Justices of the Peace, Deputy Lieutenants, and Officers of the Militia, or others, who have omitted to register or deliver in their Qualifications within the Time limited by Law, and for giving further Time for those Purposes; and for the making and filing of Affidavits of Articles of Clerkship. (Repealed by Statute Law Revision Act 1867 (30 & 31 Vict. c. 59))
Importation into Nova Scotia Act 1762 (repealed)	2 Geo. 3. c. 24	2 June 1762
An Act for importing Salt (Note: Salt for fisheries.) from Europe into the Colony of Nova Scotia in America. (Repealed by Customs Law Repeal Act 1825 (6 Geo. 4. c. 105))
American Protestant Soldier Naturalization Act 1762 or the Naturalisation Act 1762 or the Naturalization Act 1762 (repealed)	2 Geo. 3. c. 25	2 June 1762
An Act for naturalizing such Foreign Protestants as have served, or shall serve, for the Time therein mentioned, as Officers, or Soldiers, in His Majesty's Royal American Regiment, or as Engineers in America. (Repealed by Statute Law Revision Act 1867 (30 & 31 Vict. c. 59))
Papists Act 1762 (repealed)	2 Geo. 3. c. 26	2 June 1762
An Act for allowing further Time for Enrolments of Deeds and Wills made by Papists; and for Relief of Protestant Purchasers. (Repealed by Statute Law Revision Act 1867 (30 & 31 Vict. c. 59))
Court of Session Adjournment Act 1762 (repealed)	2 Geo. 3. c. 27	2 June 1762
An Act for enabling the Judges of the Court of Session in Scotland to make an Adjournment of the said Court for such Time, betwixt the Twentieth Day of December and the Fifteenth Day of January, Yearly, as they shall judge most convenient, not exceeding Twenty Days. (Repealed by Administration of Justice (Scotland) Act 1933 (23 & 24 Geo. 5. c. 41))
Thefts Upon the Thames Act 1762 (repealed)	2 Geo. 3. c. 28	2 June 1762
An Act to prevent the committing of Thefts and Frauds by Persons navigating Bum Boats and other Boats upon the River Thames. (Repealed by Metropolitan Police Act 1839 (2 & 3 Vict. c. 47))
Preservation of House Doves, etc. Act 1762 (repealed)	2 Geo. 3. c. 29	2 June 1762
An Act to amend so much of an Act, made in the First Year of the Reign of King James the First, intituled, "An Act for the better Execution of the Intent and Meaning of former Statutes made against shooting in Guns; and for the Preservation of the Game of Pheasants and Partridges; and against the destroying of Hares with Hare-Pipes, and tracing Hares in the Snow," (Note: Game Act 1603 (1 Jas. 1. c. 27)) as relates to the Preservation of House Doves and Pigeons, by making the Manner of convicting such Person or Persons as shall offend therein more easy and expeditious. (Repealed for England and Wales by Criminal Statutes Repeal Act 1827 (7 & 8 Geo. 4. c. 27) and for India by Criminal Law (India) Act 1828 (9 Geo. 4. c. 74))
London Bridge Act 1762	2 Geo. 3. c. 30	2 June 1762
An Act for enlarging and improving the North East Avenue of London Bridge.
Merchant Seamen Act 1762 (repealed)	2 Geo. 3. c. 31	2 June 1762
An Act for making perpetual an Act for the better Regulation and Government of Seamen in the Merchants Service; and for extending the Provisions thereof to His Majesty's Colonies in America. (Repealed by Merchant Seamen Act 1835 (5 & 6 Will. 4. c. 19))
Witham Drainage Act 1762	2 Geo. 3. c. 32	2 June 1762
An Act for draining and preserving certain low Lands called The Fens, lying on both Sides of the River Witham in the County of Lincoln; and for restoring and maintaining the Navigation of the said River, from the High Bridge in the County of Lincoln, through the Borough of Boston, to the Sea.
Supply, etc. Act 1762 (repealed)	2 Geo. 3. c. 33	2 June 1762
An Act for granting to His Majesty a certain Sum of Money, out of the Sinking Fund; and for applying certain Monies remaining in the Exchequer for the Service of the Year One Thousand Seven Hundred and Sixty-two; and for settling and securing a certain Annuity for the Use of the Right Honourable Arthur Onslow, Speaker of the House of Commons in the last Five Parliaments. (Repealed by Statute Law Revision Act 1867 (30 & 31 Vict. c. 59))
Supply, etc. (No. 2) Act 1762 (repealed)	2 Geo. 3. c. 34	2 June 1762
An Act for enabling His Majesty to raise the Sum of One Million, for the Uses and Purposes therein mentioned; and for further appropriating the Supplies granted in this Session of Parliament; and for allowing Time for the Payment of the Stamp Duties omitted to be paid upon Admissions into Corporations or Companies, and Appointments to Offices therein; and for the Relief of William Earle, in respect of a Quantity of White Salt lost by the Wreck of a Ship near the Harbour of Dublin. (Repealed by Statute Law Revision Act 1867 (30 & 31 Vict. c. 59))
Militia Pay Act 1762 (repealed)	2 Geo. 3. c. 35	2 June 1762
An Act for applying the Money granted in this Session of Parliament, towards defraying the Charge of the Pay of the Militia of that Part of Great Britain called England when unembodied, and of the Cloathing of that Part of the said Militia now unembodied, for One Year, beginning the Twenty-fifth Day of March One Thousand Seven Hundred and Sixty-two. (Repealed by Statute Law Revision Act 1867 (30 & 31 Vict. c. 59))
Stamps Act 1762 (repealed)	2 Geo. 3. c. 36	2 June 1762
An Act for better securing the Payment of the Sums of Money directed, by an Act made in the Thirty-second Year of the Reign of His late Majesty King George the Second, (Note: Salaries of Judges Act 1758 (32 Geo. 2. c. 35)) to be applied in Augmentation of the Salaries of the Puisne Judges in the Court of King's Bench, the Judges in the Court of Common Pleas, the Barons of the Coif in the Court of Exchequer at Westminster, and the Justices of Chester, and the Great Sessions for the Counties in Wales, for the Time being. (Repealed by Inland Revenue Repeal Act 1870 (33 & 34 Vict. c. 99))
Hampshire, Kent, Sussex Fortifications Act 1762	2 Geo. 3. c. 37	2 June 1762
An Act for vesting certain Lands, Tenements, and Hereditaments, upon the Sea Coasts, in the Counties of Kent, Sussex, and Southampton, on which Forts and Batteries have been erected for the Defence of the said Coasts, in Trustees, for certain Uses; and for other Purposes therein mentioned.
Kingston-upon-Hull (Small Debts) Act 1762 (repealed)	2 Geo. 3. c. 38	2 June 1762
An Act for the more easy and speedy Recovery of Small Debts, within the Town and County of the Town of Kingston upon Hull. (Repealed by Hull Court of Requests Act 1808 (48 Geo. 3. c. cix) and County Courts Act 1846 (9 & 10 Vict. c. 95))
Southampton and Wilts Road Act 1762 (repealed)	2 Geo. 3. c. 39	23 December 1761
An Act for repairing and widening the Roads from Mullen's Pond in the County of Southampton, to the Eighteen Mile Stone from the City of Salisbury, near Willoughby Hedge, and from West Amesbury to Anstlow Hill, and from Amesbury to Fiddleton, and from The New Inn in Amesbury to the End of the Parish leading to Durrington, and from Wily to Cook's House and Landford, and from Beacon Hill to The Nag's Head, and from thence One Mile of the Road leading to Shrewton in the County of Wilts. (Repealed by Southampton and Salisbury Roads Act 1804 (44 Geo. 3. c. v) and Mullen's Pond (Southampton) and Salisbury Road and Branches Act 1825 (6 Geo. 4. c. xcv))
Halifax (Water Supply) Act 1762 (repealed)	2 Geo. 3. c. 40	24 March 1762
An Act for supplying the Town of Halifax with Water. (Repealed by Halifax Improvement Act 1823 (4 Geo. 4. c. xc) and Halifax Extension and Improvement Act 1865 (28 & 29 Vict. c. cxl))
Oxfordshire Roads Act 1762 (repealed)	2 Geo. 3. c. 41	24 March 1762
An Act for rendering more effectual several Acts, passed in the Fifth Year of His late Majesty King George the First, (Note: Stokenchurch and New Woodstock Road Act 1718 (5 Geo. 1. c. 1 Pr.)) and the Thirteenth Year of His late Majesty King George the Second, (Note: Oxfordshire Roads Act 1739 (13 Geo. 2. c. 15)) for repairing the Roads from the Top of Stokenchurch Hill to Enslow Bridge, through the City of Oxford, by Begbroke, to New Woodstock in the County of Oxon; and for repairing the Road from The Crown Alehouse to the Turnpike on Stokenchurch Hill aforesaid; and for repairing the Mile Ways on each Side the said City, as therein mentioned. (Repealed by Stokenchurch and New Woodstock Road Act 1778 (18 Geo. 3. c. 91))
Stafford and Chester Roads Act 1762 (repealed)	2 Geo. 3. c. 42	24 March 1762
An Act for repairing, widening, and altering, the Road from Sandon in the County of Stafford, to Bullock Smithy in the County of Chester; and from Hilderstone to Draycott in the Moors, and from Wetley Rocks to Tean in the said County of Stafford. (Repealed by Sandon Roads (Cheshire and Staffordshire) Act 1824 (5 Geo. 4. c. xxiv))
Saltash Roads Act 1762 (repealed)	2 Geo. 3. c. 43	24 March 1762
An Act for repairing and widening several Roads in the Counties of Cornwall and Devon, leading to the Borough of Saltash, in the County of Cornwall. (Repealed by Saltash Roads Act 1823 (4 Geo. 4. c. vi))
Lancaster Roads Act 1762 (repealed)	2 Geo. 3. c. 44	24 March 1762
An Act for repairing and widening the Roads from a certain Place near Bolton in the Moors to Leigh, and thence to the Guide Post near Golbourne Dale, and to the South End of Newton Bridge, and from the said Guide Post to Winwick; and from Newton, by Parr Stocks, to the Guide Post in Parr, in the County Palatine of Lancaster. (Repealed by Bolton-le-Moors and Parr Roads Act 1829 (10 Geo. 4. c. lxxxv))
Chester (Poor Relief, etc.) Act 1762 (repealed)	2 Geo. 3. c. 45	24 March 1762
An Act for better regulating the Poor, maintaining a Nightly Watch, lighting, paving, and cleansing, the Streets, Rows, and Passages, providing Fire Engines and Firemen, and regulating the Hackney Coachmen, Chairmen, Carmen, and Porters, within the City of Chester. (Repealed by Poor Law Board's Provisional Orders Confirmation Act 1869 (32 & 33 Vict. c. cxxiii) and Chester Corporation Act 1932 (22 & 23 Geo. 5. c. lxxxiv))
Cornwall Roads Act 1762 (repealed)	2 Geo. 3. c. 46	24 March 1762
An Act for repairing and widening the Road from the Lostwithiel Turnpike Road in the Parish of Creed, in the County of Cornwall, through Tregony, to Ruan Lanehorne; and from Dennis Water to Three Hundred Yards on the South Side of Trethim Mill in the Parish of Saint Just in the said County. (Repealed by Road from Creed to Ruan Lanehorne (Cornwall) Act 1827 (7 & 8 Geo. 4. c. lxxiii))
Nottingham (Lighting, etc.) Act 1762 (repealed)	2 Geo. 3. c. 47	24 March 1762
An Act for the enlightening the Streets, Lanes, and Passages, within the Town and County of the Town of Nottingham. (Repealed by Nottingham Street Lighting Act 1843 (6 & 7 Vict. c. ii))
Hertford Roads Act 1762 (repealed)	2 Geo. 3. c. 48	24 March 1762
An Act for enlarging the Term and Powers granted by Two several Acts, passed in the Sixth (Note: Hertfordshire Roads Act 1732 (6 Geo. 2. c. 24)) and Sixteenth (Note: Hertfordshire Roads Act 1742 (16 Geo. 2. c. 16)) Years of His late Majesty, for the more effectual repairing the Roads leading from Wadesmill in the County of Hertford; to Barley and Royston; and for making the said Acts more effectual. (Repealed by Roads from Wadesmill to Barley and Royston Act 1821 (1 & 2 Geo. 4. c. xvii) and Annual Turnpike Acts Continuance Act 1872 (35 & 36 Vict. c. 85))
Wilts Roads Act 1762 (repealed)	2 Geo. 3. c. 49	24 March 1762
An Act for amending and widening the Road from the Turnpike Road at or near the Town of Swindon to the North End or Side of the Town of Marlborough, and from the said Town of Marlborough to the Village of Everley, in the County of Wilts. (Repealed by Road from the Swindon Turnpike to Everley Act 1805 (45 Geo. 3. c. xxxvii), Swindon and Marlborough Road Act 1826 (7 Geo. 4. c. cxxxvii) and Marlborough District of Roads Act 1832 (2 & 3 Will. 4. c. xcvii) (Note: Incorrectly cited as "2 & 3 Will. 4. c. xcviii" in the Chronological Table of the Statutes.))
Devon Roads Act 1762 (repealed)	2 Geo. 3. c. 50	24 March 1762
An Act for repairing, widening, and altering, several Roads leading from Tavistock to Plymouth, and other Places, in the County of Devon. (Repealed by Roads from Tavistock to Plymouth and from Manadon Gate Act 1804 (44 Geo. 3. c. xvi) and Tavistock and New Bridge Roads Act 1804 (44 Geo. 3. c. lxxvi))
Wilts Roads (No. 2) Act 1762 (repealed)	2 Geo. 3. c. 51	24 March 1762
An Act to amend and render more effectual an Act passed in the last Session of Parliament, intituled, "An Act for amending, widening, and keeping in Repair, the Road leading from Fisherton Bridge (Note: Fisherton Bridge, carrying Fisherton Street across the River Avon, Salisbury, Wiltshire. 51°04′08″N 1°47′54″W) to the Turnpike Road at Willoughby Hedge (Note: Willoughby Hedge is at the junction of the A303 and B3089 roads, north of West Knoyle, Wiltshire. 51°06′04″N 2°11′15″W) in West Knoyle, and from Wilton Bridge (Note: Burden's Ball Bridge, Wilton, Wiltshire. 51°04′59″N 1°51′36″W) to the Turnpike Road at the West End of Heytesbury; (Note: The junction of the A36 and B390 roads west of Heytesbury, Wiltshire. 51°10′52″N 2°05′37″W) and also the Road from the Turnpike Road at the Top of Red Hone Hill (Note: Redhorn Hill, south of Urchfont, Wiltshire. 51°18′09″N 1°54′59″W) in the Parish of Urshfont, to the Mile Stone at the Western End of Fisherton Street (Note: Junction of Fisherton Street, Devizes Street and Wilton Street, Salisbury, Wiltshire. 51°04′19″N 1°48′18″W) in the County of Wilts." (Note: Wilts Roads Act 1760 (1 Geo. 3. c. 37)) (Repealed by Roads from Fisherton, Wilton and Heytesbury Act 1815 (55 Geo. 3. c. lxii) and Annual Turnpike Acts Continuance Act 1869 (32 & 33 Vict. c. 90))
Stockton Bridge Act 1762 (repealed)	2 Geo. 3. c. 52	24 March 1762
An Act for building a Bridge cross the River Teese, at or near the Ferry in the Parish of Stockton; in the County of Durham. (Repealed by Stockton Bridge Act 1881 (44 & 45 Vict. c. cxlvii))
Salop and Stafford Roads Act 1762	2 Geo. 3. c. 53	24 March 1762
An Act for repairing and widening the Roads leading from Kelsall in the County of Salop to Whiston Cross, and from thence; over Burnhill Green; Rudge Heath, by the Two New Inns, and to a Place called High Gate Warren in the County of Stafford.
Leicestershire Roads Act 1762 (repealed)	2 Geo. 3. c. 54	24 March 1762
An Act for amending, widening, and keeping in Repair, the Road from Castle Street at the End of the Town of Hinckley, to Lutterworth Town's End; and from or near the Guide Post at Walcot Town's End in the County of Leicester, to the Eighty Mile Stone in Welford Field in the County of Northampton. (Repealed by Road from Hinckley to Lutterworth Act 1805 (45 Geo. 3. c. xxxvi) and Road from Hinckley to Lutterworth Act 1823 (4 Geo. 4. c. lx))
Dumfries Beer Duties Act 1762 (repealed)	2 Geo. 3. c. 55	8 April 1762
An Act for continuing and rendering more effectual an Act, passed in the Tenth Year of His late Majesty King George the Second, (Note: Dumfries Beer Duties Act 1736 (10 Geo. 2. c. 7)) intituled, "An Act for continuing an Act passed in the Third Year of the Reign of His Majesty King George the First, (Note: Dumfries Beer Duties Act 1716 (3 Geo. 1. c. 6)) for laying a Duty of Two Pennies Scots, or One Sixth Part of a Penny Sterling, on every Pint of Ale or Beer that shall be vended or sold within the Town of Dumfries and Privileges thereof, for paying the Debts of the said Town; and for building a Church, and making a Harbour there;" and for laying a Duty on the Tonnage of Shipping, and a Duty on Goods imported and exported into and out of the Port of the said Town, for the better repairing of the said Harbour. (Repealed by Statute Law Revision Act 1948 (11 & 12 Geo. 6. c. 62))
Sankey Brook Navigation Act 1762 (repealed)	2 Geo. 3. c. 56	8 April 1762
An Act to amend, and render more effectual, an Act made in the Twenty-eighth Year of the Reign of His late Majesty King George the Second, (Note: Sankey Brook Navigation Act 1755 (28 Geo. 2. c. 8)) for making navigable Sankey Brook, in the County of Lancaster; and for the extending and improving the said Navigation. (Repealed by Sankey Brook Navigation Act 1830 (11 Geo. 4 & 1 Will. 4. c. l))
Hants and Dorset Roads Act 1762 (repealed)	2 Geo. 3. c. 57	8 April 1762
An Act to amend an Act made in the Thirty-second Year of the Reign of His late Majesty, (Note: Dorset Roads Act 1758 (32 Geo. 2. c. 50)) for repairing and widening several Roads therein mentioned, in the Counties of Southampton and Dorset; and for amending and widening the Road between Ringwood Gate in the County of Southampton to Woolsbridge, and from thence to the Great Western Road between a Place called Thick Thorn and Cashmore Inn. (Repealed by Winchester Roads Act 1823 (4 Geo. 4. c. cxx))
St. James, Westminster (Poor Relief, etc.) Act 1762 (repealed)	2 Geo. 3. c. 58	8 April 1762
An Act for the better Relief and Employment of the Poor; and for cleansing the Streets, Lanes, and other Passages and Places, in the Parish of Saint James within the Liberty of Westminster; and for enlarging the Church-Yard belonging to the said Parish. (Repealed by London Government (City of Westminster) Order in Council 1901 (SR&O 1901/278))
Wilts Roads (No. 3) Act 1762 (repealed)	2 Geo. 3. c. 59	8 April 1762
An Act for repairing, widening, turning, and shortening, the Road leading from the Turnpike Road on Farrad's Common in the Parish of Bradford, through Holt and Melksham, to Homan's Stile in the Parish of Laycock in the County of Wilts. (Repealed by Road through Holt and Melksham (Wiltshire) Act 1826 (7 Geo. 4. c. xviii) (Note: The regnal year is omitted in the Chronological Table of the Statutes, which cites the repealing act only as "G 4 c xviii".))
Weyhill and Lyde Way Road Act 1762 (repealed)	2 Geo. 3. c. 60	8 April 1762
An Act for repairing and widening the Road from the Turnpike Road at Weyhill in the County of Southampton, to the Turnpike Road at Lyde Way in the County of Wilts. (Repealed by Weyhill and Lydeway Road Act 1820 (1 Geo. 4. c. xxiv) and Annual Turnpike Acts Continuance Act 1873 (36 & 37 Vict. c. 90))
Dorset, etc., Roads Act 1762 (repealed)	2 Geo. 3. c. 61	8 April 1762
An Act for altering, widening, and amending, the Road from the North Gate of the City of Winchester, over Worthy Cow Down, through Whitchurch and other Places, to Newtown River, and also the Road from Worthy Cow Down aforesaid, through Wherwell, to the present Turnpike Road at Andover in the County of Southampton. (Repealed by Roads from Winchester and from Worthy Cow Down Act 1823 (4 Geo. 4. c. lxxxiii))
Stafford, Chester and Derby Roads Act 1762 (repealed)	2 Geo. 3. c. 62	8 April 1762
An Act for repairing and widening the High Road leading from Ashborne in the County of Derby, to the Town of Leek in the County of Stafford, and from Ryecroft Gate upon Rushton Common to Congleton in the County of Chester, and also the Road leading from Blyth Marsh in the County of Stafford, through Cheadle, Oakamoor, and Blore, to the Turnpike Road from Ashborne to Buxton near Thorp in the County of Derby. (Repealed by Ashbourne and Leek, and Rushton Common and Congleton Roads Act 1826 (7 Geo. 4. c. lxxix))
Hertford and Bucks Roads Act 1762 (repealed)	2 Geo. 3. c. 63	8 April 1762
An Act for amending, widening, altering, and keeping in Repair, the Road from the South End of Sparrow's Herne on Bushey Heath, through the Market Towns of Watford, Berkhampstead Saint Peter's, and Tring, in the County of Hertford, by Pettipher's Elms, to the Turnpike Road at Walton near Aylesbury in the County of Bucks. (Repealed by Sparrows Herne (Hertfordshire) and Walton (Buckinghamshire) Road Act 1823 (4 Geo. 4. c. lxiv))
Devon Roads (No. 2) Act 1762 (repealed)	2 Geo. 3. c. 64	8 April 1762
An Act for amending, widening, and keeping in Repair, several Roads leading from Bridge Town Pomeroy, and from Teing Bridge, in the County of Devon. (Repealed by Devon Roads Act 1780 (20 Geo. 3. c. 79))
Kent Roads Act 1762 (repealed)	2 Geo. 3. c. 65	8 April 1762
An Act for repairing and widening the Roads from the White Post on Haselden's Wood in the Parish of Cranbrooke to Appledore Heath, and from Milk House Street in the same Parish to Castleden's Oak in the Parish of Biddenden, and from Golford Green in the said Parish of Cranbrooke to Tanner's Vent in the Parish of Benenden, all in the County of Kent. (Repealed by Road from Cranbrooke to Appledore Heath and Branches (Kent) Act 1829 (10 Geo. 4. c. lxxxviii))
Wilts Roads (No. 4) Act 1762 (repealed)	2 Geo. 3. c. 66	8 April 1762
An Act for repairing the Road from the Turnpike Road on the Top of Whitesheet Hill to a Place called The Hare Warren, and from thence to the Index Post standing near the Blandford Turnpike Road on the Side of Harnham Hill; and also for repairing and widening the Road from the said Index Post to a House called Master Baker's Farm House, in the County of Wilts. (Repealed by Harnham Hill, Blandford and Dorchester Road Act 1828 (9 Geo. 4. c. xxi))
Kent and Sussex Roads Act 1762 (repealed)	2 Geo. 3. c. 67	8 April 1762
An Act for continuing, enlarging, and rendering more effectual, so much of an Act, made in the Fourteenth Year of the Reign of His late Majesty King George the Second, (Note: Kent and Sussex Roads Act 1740 (14 Geo. 2. c. 12)) intituled, "An Act for enlarging the Terms and Powers granted by Two Acts of Parliament, (Note: Sevenoaks and Tunbridge Highways Act 1709 (8 Ann. c. 20)) (Note: Kent Roads (No. 2) Act 1724 (11 Geo. 1. c. 15)) for repairing the Roads leading from Seven Oaks to Woodsgate and Tonbridge Wells, and from Woodsgate to Kipping's Cross, in the County of Kent; and also for repairing the Roads from Kipping's Cross aforesaid to Lamberhurst Pound and Pullen's Hill in the said County, and to Flimwell Vent in the County of Sussex," as relates to the amending, repairing, and keeping in Repair, the said Roads leading from Kipping's Cross aforesaid, to Lamberhurst Pound, Pullen's Hill, and Flimwell Vent aforesaid. (Repealed by Kipping's Cross and Flimwell Vent Road (Kent and Sussex) Act 1829 (10 Geo. 4. c. xxvi))
Liverpool (Improvement) Act 1762	2 Geo. 3. c. 68	8 April 1762
An Act for building Two new Churches, and providing Burial Places, within the Town of Liverpool, in the County Palatine of Lancaster; and for the better preserving the Pavements of the Streets in the said Town; and for ascertaining the Fares and Prices to be paid Carters, Carmen, Hackney Coachmen, and Chairmen; and for regulating their Behaviour within the said Town.
Hinckley and Coventry Road Act 1762 (repealed)	2 Geo. 3. c. 69	2 June 1762
An Act for explaining and amending so much of Two Acts of the Twenty-seventh (Note: Leicester and Warwick Roads Act 1754 (27 Geo. 2. c. 42)) and Twenty-ninth (Note: Hinckley and Coventry Road Act 1756 (29 Geo. 2. c. 66)) Years of His late Majesty, for repairing several Roads therein mentioned, in the Counties of Leicester and Warwick, as relates to the Road between Hinckley and Coventry. (Repealed by Hinckley, Nuneaton and Coventry Road Act 1825 (6 Geo. 4. c. x), Watling Street, and Mancester (Warwickshire) and Wolvey Heath Road Act 1831 (1 Will. 4. c. xiv) (Note: The regnal year is omitted in the Chronological Table of the Statutes, which cites this act only as "W 4 c xiv".) and Coventry and Over Whitacre Road Act 1831 (1 Will. 4. c. xli))
Kingston-upon-Hull (Improvement) Act 1762 (repealed)	2 Geo. 3. c. 70	2 June 1762
An Act to amend and render more effectual several Acts made for cleansing and enlightening the Streets of the Town of Kingston upon Hull, and for preventing Annoyances therein. (Repealed by Kingston-upon-Hull Improvement Act 1854 (17 & 18 Vict. c. ci))
Doncaster to Salter's Brook Road Act 1762 (repealed)	2 Geo. 3. c. 71	2 June 1762
An Act for continuing the Term and Powers of an Act made in the Fourteenth Year of the Reign of His late Majesty, intituled, "An Act for repairing the Road from Doncaster, through the Parish of Peniston, in the County of York, to Salter's Brook in the County of Chester; and also the Road from Rotherham in the said County of York, to Hartcliffe Hill in the said Parish of Peniston;" (Note: Doncaster to Salter's Brook Road Act 1740 (14 Geo. 2. c. 31)) and for making the said Act more effectual, so far as the same relates to the said Road between Doncaster and Salter's Brook. (Repealed by Road from Doncaster to Salter's Brook Bridge Act 1826 (7 Geo. 4. c. cxxx))
Sussex and Kent Roads Act 1762 (repealed)	2 Geo. 3. c. 72	2 June 1762
An Act for repairing and widening the Road from Flimwell Vent in the County of Sussex, through Highgate in the County of Kent, and the Parishes of Sandhurst, Newenden, and Northiam, to Rye in the said County of Sussex; and from Highgate aforesaid to Cooper's Corner in the said County of Sussex, and to Tubb's Lake in the said County of Kent. (Repealed by Sussex Roads Act 1825 (6 Geo. 4. c. xliii))
Lincoln and Rutland Roads Act 1762 (repealed)	2 Geo. 3. c. 73	2 June 1762
An Act for repairing and widening the Roads from a certain Bridge called James Deeping Stone Bridge, to Peter's Gate in Stamford in the County of Lincoln, and from thence to the South End of the Town of Morcot in the County of Rutland. (Repealed by Road from James Deeping Stone Bridge to Stamford and to Morcott Act 1829 (10 Geo. 4. c. lxxviii))
Gloucester and Wilts Roads Act 1762 (repealed)	2 Geo. 3. c. 74	2 June 1762
An Act to amend and render more effectual an Act, made in the Twenty-ninth Year of the Reign of His late Majesty, intituled, "An Act for amending and keeping in Repair the Roads leading from Meadbrook, which divides the Parishes of Pucklechurch and Mangotsfield in the County of Gloucester, to Christian Malford Bridge in the County of Wilts; and also from Pucklechurch aforesaid to certain Coal Mines in the said Parish." (Note: Gloucester and Wiltshire Roads Act 1756 (29 Geo. 2. c. 56)) (Repealed by Pucklechurch or Lower District of Roads Act 1831 (1 Will. 4. c. lxii) and Draycot or Upper District Turnpike Road (Wiltshire) Act 1831 (1 Will. 4. c. lxiii))
Sudbury to Bury St. Edmunds Road Act 1762 (repealed)	2 Geo. 3. c. 75	2 June 1762
An Act for repairing and widening the High Road leading from the North End of Ballingdon Bridge in Sudbury in the County of Suffolk, to the South Gate in Bury Saint Edmunds in the said County. (Repealed by Sudbury and Bury St. Edmunds Road Act 1826 (7 Geo. 4. c. cxxxi))
Kent Roads (No. 2) Act 1762 (repealed)	2 Geo. 3. c. 76	2 June 1762
An Act for amending and widening the Road leading to the High Post Road near the Town of Faversham, by Bacon's Water, through Ashford, to the Town and Port of Hythe in the County of Kent, and from Bacon's Water to a certain Lane called Holy Lane in Wincheap near the City of Canterbury. (Repealed by Faversham, Hythe and Canterbury Roads Act 1824 (5 Geo. 4. c. lxii))
Denbigh Roads Act 1762 (repealed)	2 Geo. 3. c. 77	2 June 1762
An Act to enlarge the Term and Powers, and also to render more effectual, an Act for amending, widening, and keeping in Repair, the several Roads from the Town of Pool in the County of Montgomery, to Wrexham in the County of Denbigh; and also the Road from Knockin in the County of Salop, to Llanrhaiader in Mochnant in the County of Denbigh; and to repair and widen several other Roads therein mentioned. (Repealed by Montgomery Salop and Denbigh Roads Act 1788 (28 Geo. 3. c. 96))
Worcester and Salop Roads Act 1762 (repealed)	2 Geo. 3. c. 78	2 June 1762
An Act for amending and widening the Road from the Market-House in Stourbridge, to Colly Gate in Cradley, and from Pedmore to Holly Hall, and from Colley Gate to Halesowen, and from the Turnpike Road on Dudley Wood to Rednal Green in the Parish of King's Norton, and from Carter's Lane to The Bell Inn at Northfield, in the Counties of Worcester, Stafford, and Salop. (Repealed by Pedmore and Rowley Road Act 1852 (15 & 16 Vict. c. lxxxvi))
Salop and Worcester Roads Act 1762 (repealed)	2 Geo. 3. c. 79	2 June 1762
An Act for amending, widening, and keeping in Repair, several Roads, leading from Cleobury Mortimer, The Cross Houses, Glazeley, and the Turnpike Gate on Abberley Hill, in the Counties of Salop and Worcester. (Repealed by Roads from Bridgnorth to Cleobury Mortimer Act 1825 (6 Geo. 4. c. xlix))
Leicester, Warwick and Coventry Roads Act 1762	2 Geo. 3. c. 80	2 June 1762
An Act for amending, widening, and keeping in Repair, several Roads therein mentioned, lying in the Counties of Leicester and Warwick, and in the County of the City of Coventry.
Cumberland and Westmorland Roads Act 1762 (repealed)	2 Geo. 3. c. 81	2 June 1762
An Act for widening, repairing, and amending, the Road from Hesket by Yewes Bridge to Cockermouth, and from thence by Lorton, over Whinlatter, to Keswick in the County of Cumberland, and from Keswick by Dummail Rays and Ambleside to Kirby in Kendall in the County of Westmorland, and from Plumbgarth's Cross near Kirby in Kendall aforesaid to the Lake called Windermere in the County of Westmorland, and from Keswick aforesaid to the Town of Penrith in the County of Cumberland. (Repealed by Penrith and Cockermouth Road Act 1824 (5 Geo. 4. c. iv) and Keswick and Plumbgarth's Cross and Windermere Roads Act 1824 (5 Geo. 4. c. xiv) (Note: The Chronological Table of the Statutes also lists the Roads from Kirkby Steven through Sedbergh to Greeta Bridge Act 1805 (45 Geo. 3. c. xxvii) here, but that act's long title recites the Lancaster and Westmorland Roads Act 1762 (2 Geo. 3. c. 83) instead.))
Leicester and Notts Roads Act 1762 (repealed)	2 Geo. 3. c. 82	2 June 1762
An Act to continue and render more effectual an Act, passed in the Thirtieth Year of the Reign of His late Majesty, (Note: Leicester Roads Act 1757 (30 Geo. 2. c. 44)) for amending, widening, and keeping in Repair, the Road leading from Burleigh Bridge in the Town of Loughborough, to Ashby de la Zouch in the County of Leicester; and for repairing and widening the Road branching out of the said Road at Coleorton Church over Coleorton Moor, and through Worthington and Sutton Bonington, to Rempston in the Counties of Leicester and Nottingham. (Repealed by Loughborough, Ashby-de-la-Zouche and Rempstone Road Act 1863 (26 & 27 Vict. c. liii))
Lancaster and Westmorland Roads Act 1762 (repealed)	2 Geo. 3. c. 83	2 June 1762
An Act for repairing and widening the Roads from Kirby-Steven High-Lane Head in the County of Westmorland, through Sedbergh, to Greeta Bridge in the County Palatine of Lancaster, and from Bracken Bar Gate near Askrigg in the County of York, through Sedbergh, to Kirby Kendal; and also the Road from The Four Lane Ends in Marthwaite, to the Turnpike Road on Grayrigg House, leading from Appleby to Kirkby Kendal in the said County of Westmorland. (Repealed by Roads from Kirkby Steven through Sedbergh to Greeta Bridge Act 1805 (45 Geo. 3. c. xxvii) (Note: Listed under 2 Geo. 3. c. 81 in the Chronological Table of the Statutes, but that act's long title recites this act.) and Kirkby Steven and Greeta Bridge Roads Act 1826 (7 Geo. 4. c. lxxii))
Cosham to Chichester Road Act 1762 (repealed)	2 Geo. 3. c. 84	2 June 1762
An Act for repairing and widening the Roads from Cosham in the County of Southampton, to the City of Chichester. (Repealed by Road from Cosham to Chichester Act 1806 (46 Geo. 3. c. xlvi))
Rye Harbour Act 1762 (repealed)	2 Geo. 3. c. 85	2 June 1762
An Act to empower the Commissioners and Trustees (named and appointed by and in Pursuance of an Act of Parliament, made in the Tenth Year of the Reign of His late Majesty King George the First, (Note: Rye Harbour Act 1723 (10 Geo. 1. c. 7)) for making more effectual an Act made in the Ninth Year of His Majesty's Reign, intituled, "An Act for completing the Repairs of the Harbour of Dover in the County of Kent; and for restoring the Harbour of Rye in the County of Sussex to its ancient Goodness," (Note: Dover Harbour Act 1722 (9 Geo. 1. c. 30)) so far as the same relates to the Harbour of Rye) to let the Sea and Tides into a new Cut, or Channel, made in Pursuance of the said Act of the Tenth Year of His said late Majesty's Reign, as far as a Wall called Winchilsea Wall. (Repealed by Rye Harbour Act 1797 (37 Geo. 3. c. 130))
Liverpool Harbour Act 1762 (repealed)	2 Geo. 3. c. 86	2 June 1762
An Act to enlarge the Term and Powers granted by an Act passed in the Eleventh Year of the Reign of His late Majesty, (Note: Liverpool Dock Act 1737 (11 Geo. 2. c. 32)) for continuing several Acts relating to the Harbour of Liverpool; and for enlarging the said Harbour, by making an additional Dock, and building a Pier in the Open Harbour there; and for enlightening the said Dock, and for making another Dock, with proper Piers, in the said Harbour; and for erecting Lighthouses and other proper Lights in or near the Port of Liverpool. (Repealed by Mersey Dock Acts Consolidation Act 1858 (21 & 22 Vict. c. xcii))
Whitehaven Improvement Act 1762	2 Geo. 3. c. 87	2 June 1762
An Act for enlarging the Terms and Powers of several Acts of Parliament, relating to the Harbour of Whitehaven in the County of Cumberland, and to the Roads leading to the said Harbour and Town of Whitehaven; and for further enlarging the said Harbour; and for lighting the said Town, and supplying the same with Water, and for regulating the Carmen there; and for repealing so much of an Act of the Twenty-third Year of the Reign of His late Majesty, (Note: Cumberland Roads Act 1749 (23 Geo. 2. c. 40)) as relates to the Road from Calder Bridge to Egremont, and directing how the said Road shall be repaired; and for repairing several other Roads therein mentioned, in the said County.

=== Private acts ===
Short title	Citation	Royal assent
Long title
Elvaston and Thulston Inclosure Act 1762	2 Geo. 3. c. 5 Pr.	10 February 1762
An Act for establishing and confirming certain Articles of Agreement, for the dividing and enclosing several Common Fields, Meadows, and Pastures, in the Townships of Elvaston and Thulston, in the County of Derby.
Naturalization of Francis Fatio, John le Coq, John Cazenove and Henry Kuhff.	2 Geo. 3. c. 6 Pr.	10 February 1762
An Act for naturalizing Francis Rodolph Fatio, John Le Coq, John Henry Cazenove, and Henry Peter Kuhff.
Swansea Inclosure Act 1762	2 Geo. 3. c. 7 Pr.	24 March 1762
An Act for dividing and enclosing Two Pieces or Parcels of Open and Unenclosed Lands, called The Town Hill and The Burroughs; in the Borough and Manor of Swansea, in the County of Glamorgan.
Aston upon Trent Inclosure Act 1762	2 Geo. 3. c. 8 Pr.	24 March 1762
An Act for dividing and enclosing the Common Fields, Meadows, Pastures, and Waste Grounds, in the Township of Aston upon Trent, in the County of Derby.
Swanburne Inclosure Act 1762	2 Geo. 3. c. 9 Pr.	24 March 1762
An Act for dividing and enclosing the Common Fields, Common Meadows, Common Grounds, and Commonable Places, in the Parish of Swanburne, in the County of Berks.
Barrowby Inclosure Act 1762	2 Geo. 3. c. 10 Pr.	24 March 1762
An Act for dividing and enclosing several Common Fields, Meadows, Pastures, and Waste Grounds, in the Parish of Barrowby, in the County of Lincoln.
Bridgewater Canal Extension Act 1762	2 Geo. 3. c. 11 Pr.	24 March 1762
An Act to enable the most Noble Francis Duke of Bridgewater to make a Navigable Cut, or Canal, from Longford Bridge in the Township of Stretford in the County Palatine of Lancaster, to the River Mersey, at a Place called The Hemp Stones in the Township of Halton in the County of Chester.
Bishopstone Tide Mills Act 1762	2 Geo. 3. c. 12 Pr.	24 March 1762
An Act for authorizing and enabling John Woods, William Woods, and John Challen, Merchants, to erect and build One or more Tide Mill or Tide Mills, for grinding Corn and Grain, upon a Creek or Channel in the Manor and Parish of Bishopston, in the County of Sussex.
Wyndham's Estate Act 1762	2 Geo. 3. c. 13 Pr.	24 March 1762
An Act for Sale of certain Lands, Tenements, and Hereditaments, in the Parishes of Witham, Frary, Marston, or Nunny, in the County of Somerset, devised and limited by the Will of Sir William Wyndham Baronet, deceased; and for laying out the Money arising by such Sale in the Purchase of other Lands and Hereditaments, to be settled to the same Uses, except as therein mentioned.
Confirming and establishing a partition between Samuel Hunt, Henry Humphrey, James Clitherow and others, of their estates in Sussex, Surrey and Kent and settling premises to uses mentioned.	2 Geo. 3. c. 14 Pr.	24 March 1762
An Act for confirming and establishing a Partition between Samuel Blunt, Henry Humphery, James Clitherow, Esquires, and others, of several Estates in the Counties of Sussex, Surrey, and Kent; and for vesting and settling the entire Premises to the several Uses therein mentioned.
Tancred's Charities Act 1762	2 Geo. 3. c. 15 Pr.	24 March 1762
An Act for incorporating the Trustees named in the Settlement and Will of Christopher Tancred Esquire, deceased; and to enable them to take the Estate late of the said Christopher Tancred, to them and their Successors in Perpetuity, for the Charitable Uses in such Settlement and Will; and for the better Management of the Charity.
Phillimore's Estate Act 1762	2 Geo. 3. c. 16 Pr.	24 March 1762
An Act for vesting a Piece or Pieces of Ground in Kensington, in the County of Middlesex, Part of the settled Estate of Robert Phillimore Gentleman, in Trustees, to be sold; and for applying the Money arising by such Sale in the Purchase of Lands, Tenements, and Hereditaments, to be settled and limited to the like Uses as the said Ground now stands settled.
Williams' Name Act 1762	2 Geo. 3. c. 17 Pr.	24 March 1762
An Act to enable the Right Honourable the Lady Frances Hanbury Williams to take upon her and use the Surname of Coningesby, pursuant to a Proviso in a Settlement made by her Father Thomas Earl Coningesby, deceased.
Hase's Name Act 1762	2 Geo. 3. c. 18 Pr.	24 March 1762
An Act to enable John Hase Esquire and his Heirs Male to take and use the Surname and Arms of Lombe.
Viscountess Stormont's Naturalization Act 1763	2 Geo. 3. c. 19 Pr.	24 March 1762
An Act for naturalizing Henrietta Frederique Viscountess Stormont, Wife of the Right Honourable David Lord Viscount Stormont.
Naturalization of Philip Schumacher and Nicholas Brandt.	2 Geo. 3. c. 20 Pr.	24 March 1762
An Act for naturalizing Philip Schumacher and Nicholas Brandt.
Wolffe's Naturalization Act 1762	2 Geo. 3. c. 21 Pr.	24 March 1762
An Act for naturalizing Jacob Wolffe Esquire, commonly called Baron Wolffe.
Metivier's Naturalization Act 1762	2 Geo. 3. c. 22 Pr.	24 March 1762
An Act for naturalizing Paul Metivier.
Repinder's Naturalization Act 1762	2 Geo. 3. c. 23 Pr.	24 March 1762
An Act for naturalizing James Repinder.
Charnaud's Naturalization Act 1762	2 Geo. 3. c. 24 Pr.	24 March 1762
An Act for naturalizing Jean Charnaud.
Princethorpe Inclosure Act 1762	2 Geo. 3. c. 25 Pr.	8 April 1762
An Act for dividing and enclosing the Open and Common Field, Common Meadows, Common Pastures, Common Grounds, and Commonable Lands, within the Hamlet and Liberties of Princethorpe, in the Township and Parish of Stretton upon Dunsmore, in the County of Warwick.
Middlewood Moor or Urshaw Moor in Lanchester (Durham) Inclosure Act 1762	2 Geo. 3. c. 26 Pr.	8 April 1762
An Act for dividing and enclosing a certain Moor, or Common, called Middlewood Moor, or Ushaw Moor, within the Manor of Lanchester, in the County of Durham.
Snettisham Inclosure Act 1762	2 Geo. 3. c. 27 Pr.	8 April 1762
An Act for dividing and enclosing the Wholeyear Lands and Pasture Grounds, Common Fields, Half-year Enclosures, Shack Meadows, and Commons, in the Parish of Snettisham, in the County of Norfolk.
Hungerton Inclosure Act 1762	2 Geo. 3. c. 28 Pr.	8 April 1762
An Act for dividing and enclosing the Open and Common Fields in the Parish of Hungerton, in the County of Leicester.
Thurnmaston Inclosure Act 1762	2 Geo. 3. c. 29 Pr.	8 April 1762
An Act for dividing and enclosing the Open Fields of Thurmaston, in the Parishes of Belgrave and Barkby, in the County of Leicester.
Whissondine Inclosure Act 1762	2 Geo. 3. c. 30 Pr.	8 April 1762
An Act for dividing and enclosing the Open and Common Fields and Common Grounds in Whissondine, in the County of Rutland.
Vesting certain lands and tenements, previously given in trust for the benefit of the poor of Woburn (Bedfordshire) in John Duke of Bedford and for establishing a better fund in lieu thereof.	2 Geo. 3. c. 31 Pr.	8 April 1762
An Act for vesting certain Lands, Tenements, and Hereditaments, heretofore given in Trust, for the Benefit of the poor Inhabitants of the Parish of Woburn in the County of Bedford, in his Grace John Duke of Bedford and his Heirs; and for establishing a better Fund in Lieu thereof.
Viscount Bolingbroke's Estate Act 1762	2 Geo. 3. c. 32 Pr.	8 April 1762
An Act for discharging the Estate of Frederick Viscount Bolingbroke, in the County of Surrey, from the Uses and Limitations of a former Settlement; and for settling Lands and Hereditaments in the County of Kent, in Lieu thereof, to the same Uses.
Enabling Patrick Blake to make a settlement on Annabela Bunbury and the issue of their intermarriage.	2 Geo. 3. c. 33 Pr.	8 April 1762
An Act to enable Patrick Blake Esquire, a Minor, to make a Settlement on Annabella Bunbury Spinster, and the Issue of their intended Marriage; and for other Purposes therein mentioned.
Mellish's Estate Act 1762	2 Geo. 3. c. 34 Pr.	8 April 1762
An Act for the Sale of Part of the Estates entailed by the Will of Edward Mellish Esquire, deceased; and for laying out the Money arising by such Sale in the Purchase of other Estates, to be settled to the like Uses.
Styleman Act 1762	2 Geo. 3. c. 35 Pr.	8 April 1762
An Act for vesting a Rent Charge in Fee Simple in Trustees, for the Benefit of certain poor Families described in the Will of John Styleman, deceased, in Lieu of a Moiety of certain Lands and Hereditaments devised by the same Will for the Benefit of the said poor Families; and for vesting the said Moiety in Fee Simple in John Boyd Esquire and his Heirs.
Mason's Estate Act 1762	2 Geo. 3. c. 36 Pr.	8 April 1762
An Act for selling Part of the Estates of William Mason Esquire, devised to him by the Will of William Mason Esquire, deceased; and for laying out the Money to arise thereby in the Purchase of other Lands and Hereditaments, to be settled, in Lieu thereof, to the Uses limited by the said Will; and for exchanging other Part of the said Estates of the said William Mason, so devised, for other Lands and Hereditaments, to be settled, in Lieu thereof, to the Uses limited by the same Will.
Vesting all real and personal estates of Elizabeth Morgan in Elizabeth Mackenzie, her niece and heir at law, discharged of all rights, claims and interests of Gonvile and Caius college, Cambridge.	2 Geo. 3. c. 37 Pr.	8 April 1762
An Act for vesting all the Real and Personal Estates late of Elizabeth Morgan Widow, deceased, in Elizabeth Mackenzie Wife of George Mackenzie Esquire, her Niece, Heir at Law, and only next of Kin, discharged from all Right, Claims, and Interest, of the Master and Fellows of Gonville and Caius College, in the University of Cambridge.
Waite's Estate Act 1762	2 Geo. 3. c. 38 Pr.	8 April 1762
An Act for the Sale of the Estate of Thomas Waite, an Infant, for discharging Encumbrances affecting the same; and for applying the Purchase-money arising thereby for the Benefit of the said Infant.
Linden's Naturalization Act 1762	2 Geo. 3. c. 39 Pr.	8 April 1762
An Act for naturalizing Diederick Wessel Linden.
Shenley Brookend Inclosure Act 1762	2 Geo. 3. c. 40 Pr.	2 June 1762
An Act for dividing and enclosing the Open and Common Fields in the Manor of Shenley Brookend, in the Parish of Shenley, in the County of Bucks.
Quorndon Inclosure Act 1762	2 Geo. 3. c. 41 Pr.	2 June 1762
An Act for dividing and enclosing the several Open and Common Fields, Madows, and Commons, within the Lordship or Liberty of Quorndon, in the County of Leicester.
Portesham Inclosure Act 1762	2 Geo. 3. c. 42 Pr.	2 June 1762
An Act for dividing and enclosing several Common Fields, Commons, Common Heaths, and Waste Grounds, in the Parish of Portesham, in the County of Dorset.
Evenwood and St. Helen's Auckland Inclosure Act 1762	2 Geo. 3. c. 43 Pr.	2 June 1762
An Act for dividing and enclosing a certain Moor, or Common, within the Manor of Evenwood, and Chapelry of Saint Helen's Auckland, and County of Durham.
Sproatley Inclosure Act 1762	2 Geo. 3. c. 44 Pr.	2 June 1762
An Act for dividing, allotting, and enclosing, the Open Fields, Pastures, and Pieces or Parcels of Meadow and Pasture Ground, in the Lordship of Sproatley in Holderness, in the County of York.
Skipsea Inclosure Act 1762	2 Geo. 3. c. 45 Pr.	2 June 1762
An Act for confirming Articles of Agreement for enclosing Common Fields, Commons, Pastures, and Waste Grounds, in the Townships or Hamlets of Dringhoe, Upton, and Brough, in the Parish of Skipsea in Holderness, in the East Riding of the County of York.
Towcester, Wood Burcott and Caldecote (Northamptonshire) Inclosures Act 1762	2 Geo. 3. c. 46 Pr.	2 June 1762
An Act for dividing and enclosing the Open and Common Fields, Common Pastures, Common Meadows, Common Grounds, and Waste Grounds, of and in the Manor, Parish, and Liberties, of Towcester, with the Hamlets of Wood Burcott, and Caldecote, in the County of Northampton.
Rotherham Inclosure Act 1762	2 Geo. 3. c. 47 Pr.	2 June 1762
An Act for enclosing and dividing the Common Fields, Moors, and Common Grounds, in the Township of Rotherham, in the County of York.
Wintringham Inclosure Act 1762	2 Geo. 3. c. 48 Pr.	2 June 1762
An Act for enclosing and dividing several Open Fields and Commonable Lands within the Manor and Parish of Wintringham, in the County of Lincoln.
Duke of Beaufort's Estate Act 1762	2 Geo. 3. c. 49 Pr.	2 June 1762
An Act for repealing Part, and explaining and amending other Parts, of an Act, made in the Thirty-second Year of the Reign of His late Majesty King George the Second, intituled, "An Act for vesting Part of the Estates entailed by the Will of the most Noble Charles Noel Duke of Beaufort, deceased, in Trustees, to be sold; and for purchasing other Estates, to be settled to the like Uses;" (Note: Duke of Beaufort's Estate Act 1758 (32 Geo. 2. c. 23 Pr.)) and for empowering the Guardian and Trustees, named in the said Will, to make Leases of the said Duke's Estates in the Counties of Gloucester, Wilts, Hants, Devon, Dorset, Glamorgan, and Brecon, during the Minority of his Children.
Duke of Somerset's Estate Act 1762	2 Geo. 3. c. 50 Pr.	2 June 1762
An Act for confirming a Partition of so many of the Estates of Charles late Duke of Somerset, deceased, as were by him settled and devised to the Use of Frances late Marchioness of Granby, and of Charlotte Countess of Aylesford, his Two Daughters, and their Issue, in strict Settlement, with several Remainders over; and for vesting and settling the entire Premises to the several Uses therein mentioned; and for the several other Purposes therein mentioned.
Earl of Harrington's Estate Act 1762	2 Geo. 3. c. 51 Pr.	2 June 1762
An Act for rectifying a Mistake in the Name of One of the Trustees in the Settlement made upon the Marriage of the Right Honourable William Earl of Harrington, with the Right Honourable Carolina Countess of Harrington his Wife.
Winterton's Estate Act 1762	2 Geo. 3. c. 52 Pr.	2 June 1762
An Act for explaining and amending the Marriage Settlement of Edward Lord Winterton in the Kingdom of Ireland, by empowering him to sell Part of the Estates, in the Counties of Sussex, Surrey, and Norfolk, therein comprised; and for laying out the Monies arising by such Sale in the Purchase of other Estates, of equal or greater Value, to be settled to the Uses of the said Marriage Settlement; and for other Purposes therein mentioned.
Carew's Estate Act 1762	2 Geo. 3. c. 53 Pr.	2 June 1762
An Act to enable Sir Nicholas Hacket Carew Baronet to grant a Lease or Leases of Part of his settled Estate, for the Improvement thereof, pursuant to a Contract by him entered into for that Purpose.
Colebrooke's Estate Act 1762	2 Geo. 3. c. 54 Pr.	2 June 1762
An Act for vesting the Capital Messuage, with the Lands and Hereditaments thereunto belonging, at Southgate in the Parish of Edmonton, and at Frian Barnett in the County of Middlesex, and at East Barnett in the County of Hertford, late Part of the Estate of James Colebrooke Esquire, deceased, comprised in the Marriage Settlement of Sir George Colebrooke Baronet, in him and his Heirs; and for settling other Lands and Hereditaments, in the Counties of Surrey and Middlesex, of equal Value, to the same Uses, in Lieu thereof; and for other Purposes in the said Act mentioned.
Ram's Estate Act 1762	2 Geo. 3. c. 55 Pr.	2 June 1762
An Act for discharging certain Leasehold Houses and Tenements, comprised in the Marriage Settlement of Humfreys Ram Esquire, from the Trusts of that Settlement; and for settling Freehold Houses, of greater Value, in Lieu thereof.
Perkins' Estate Act 1762	2 Geo. 3. c. 56 Pr.	2 June 1762
An Act for vesting a Toft (Note: 'Toft' is an archaic word for the site of a house.) or Scite of a Copyhold House in Richmond in the County of Surry, lately pulled down, in Trustees, to be sold, leased, or otherwise disposed of, for the Benefit of the Persons claiming under the Will of Matthias Perkins Gentleman, deceased; and for empowering John Perkins his Son, to make such Leases of his Estate at Richmond and Tuddington as are therein mentioned.
Ruggles' Estate Act 1762	2 Geo. 3. c. 57 Pr.	2 June 1762
An Act for discharging divers Lands, Estates, and Hereditaments, devised by the Will of Thomas Ruggles Esquire, deceased, from the Uses and Trusts of the said Will; and for settling other Lands and Tenements, of greater Value, in Lieu thereof, to the like Uses.
Jenison's Estate Act 1762	2 Geo. 3. c. 58 Pr.	2 June 1762
An Act for vesting the settled Estate late of Ralph Jenison Esquire, deceased, at Great Walworth in the County of Durham, in Trustees, in Trust, to be conveyed to John Dixon Gentleman and his Heirs, pursuant to a Decree and subsequent Orders of the Court of Chancery at Durham.
Fell's Estate Act 1762	2 Geo. 3. c. 59 Pr.	2 June 1762
An Act to enable Joseph Fell Esquire to make a Lease of a Farm and Lands in Walthamstowe, in the County of Essex, for a Term of Ninety-nine Years.
Holden's Estate Act 1762	2 Geo. 3. c. 60 Pr.	2 June 1762
An Act to enable John Holden Gentleman, and Thomas Holden his Son, an Infant, and their Trustees, to raise the Sum of One Thousand Pounds, upon certain Estates in Leicestershire and Warwickshire, or on a sufficient Part thereof, to be applied for the Purposes therein mentioned.
Sale and conveyance of two acres of land in Walton upon Thames to the executors of Samuel Dicker for the benefit of Mary Delver.	2 Geo. 3. c. 61 Pr.	2 June 1762
An Act for vesting Two Acres of Land in Walton upon Thames in Trustees, to be sold and conveyed to the Executors of Samuel Dicker Esquire, for the Benefit of Mary Delver, an Infant.
Ord's Estate Act 1762	2 Geo. 3. c. 62 Pr.	2 June 1762
An Act for vesting divers Lands and Hereditaments, in the Parish of Igborough, in the County of Norfolk, Part of the settled Estate late of Henry Ord Esquire, deceased, in Trustees, to convey the same to James Nelthorpe Esquire and his Heirs; and to lay out the Money to be paid for the same in the Purchase of other Lands and Hereditaments, to be settled to the Uses therein mentioned.
Clapham's Estate Act 1762	2 Geo. 3. c. 63 Pr.	2 June 1762
An Act for vesting certain Estates in the Parish of Saint Botolph Billingsgate, London, late the Estate of William Clapham Gentleman, in Trustees, for the Uses and Purposes therein mentioned.
Carew's Estate Act 1762	2 Geo. 3. c. 64 Pr.	2 June 1762
An Act for Sale of Part of the settled Estate of Thomas Carew of Crowcombe in the County of Somerset Esquire; and for settling other Lands and Hereditaments, of greater Value, in Lieu thereof, to the same Uses.
Weller's Estate Act 1762	2 Geo. 3. c. 65 Pr.	2 June 1762
An Act for vesting the settled Estate of John Weller Esquire, deceased, lying in the Counties of Kent and Chester, in Trustees, to be sold, to pay off Encumbrances affecting the same; and to lay out the Surplus of the Money arising by such Sale (if any) in the Purchase of other Lands, to be settled to the Uses of the Will of the said John Weller.
Richard's Name Act 1762	2 Geo. 3. c. 66 Pr.	2 June 1762
An Act to enable William Richards and Edward Richards, Infants, and their Heirs, to take and use the Surname and bear the Arms of Powell, pursuant to the Will of Roger Powell Esquire, deceased.
Loraine's Name Act 1762	2 Geo. 3. c. 67 Pr.	2 June 1762
An Act to enable Charles Smith, an Infant, lately called Charles Loraine, and his Heirs, to take and use the Surname of Smith, pursuant to the Will of Richard Smith Esquire, deceased.
Naturalization of Luke Wettstein, Peter Texier junior and Daniel Goy.	2 Geo. 3. c. 68 Pr.	2 June 1762
An Act for naturalizing Luke Wettstein, Peter Texier Junior, and Daniel Goy.
Doerner's Naturalization Act 1762	2 Geo. 3. c. 69 Pr.	2 June 1762
An Act for naturalizing John Doerner.

=== Sources ===
- "2 George III - 1761-2". The Statutes at Large. Vol. 25. Joseph Bentham. 1763. pp. 1–228 – via Internet Archive.
- "2 George III - 1761-2". The Statutes at Large. Vol. 25. Joseph Bentham. 1763. pp. 1–228 – via Google Books.
- "2 George III - 1761-2". The Statutes at Large. Vol. 25. Joseph Bentham. 1763 – via Internet Archive.
- Journals of the House of Commons. Vol. 29. London: His Majesty's Stationery Office. 1803. pp. 6–352 – via Google Books.
- Chronological Table of and Index to the Statutes. Vol. 1: To the End of the Session 59 Vict. Sess. 2 (1895) (13th ed.). London: Her Majesty's Stationery Office. 1896. pp. 120–121 – via Google Books.

== 3 Geo. 3 ==
The second session of the 12th Parliament of Great Britain, which met from 25 November 1762 until 19 April 1763.

This session was also traditionally cited as 3 G. 3.

=== Public acts ===
Short title	Citation	Royal assent
Long title
Malt Duties etc. Act 1762 (repealed)	3 Geo. 3. c. 1	21 December 1762
An Act for continuing, and granting, to His Majesty, certain Duties upon Malt, Mum, Cyder, and Perry, for the Service of the Year One Thousand Seven Hundred and Sixty-three. (Repealed by Statute Law Revision Act 1867 (30 & 31 Vict. c. 59))
Land Tax Act 1762 (repealed)	3 Geo. 3. c. 2	21 December 1762
An Act for granting an Aid to His Majesty, by a Land Tax, to be raised in Great Britain, for the Service of the Year One Thousand Seven Hundred and Sixty-three. (Repealed by Statute Law Revision Act 1867 (30 & 31 Vict. c. 59))
Marine Mutiny Act 1762 (repealed)	3 Geo. 3. c. 3	24 March 1763
An Act for the Regulation of His Majesty's Marine Forces while on Shore. (Repealed by Statute Law Revision Act 1867 (30 & 31 Vict. c. 59))
Land Tax (Commissioners) Act 1762 (repealed)	3 Geo. 3. c. 4	24 March 1763
An Act for rectifying Mistakes in the Names of several of the Commissioners appointed, by an Act made in the last Session of Parliament, (Note: Land Tax (Commissioners) Act 1761 (2 Geo. 3. c. 13)) to put in Execution an Act made in the same Session, intituled, "An Act for granting an Aid to His Majesty, by a Land Tax to be raised in Great Britain, for the Service of the Year One Thousand Seven Hundred and Sixty-two;" (Note: Land Tax Act 1761 (2 Geo. 3. c. 3)) and for appointing other Commissioners, together with those named in the first-mentioned Act, to put in Execution an Act of this Session of Parliament, (Note: Land Tax Act 1762 (3 Geo. 3. c. 2)) for granting an Aid to His Majesty, by a Land Tax to be raised in Great Britain, for the Service of the Year One Thousand Seven Hundred and Sixty-three. (Repealed by Statute Law Revision Act 1867 (30 & 31 Vict. c. 59))
Indemnity Act 1762 (repealed)	3 Geo. 3. c. 5	24 March 1763
An Act to indemnify such as have omitted to qualify themselves for Offices and Employments; and to indemnify Justices of the Peace, Deputy Lieutenants, and Officers of the Militia, or others, who have omitted to register or deliver in their Qualifications within the Time limited by Law, and for giving further Time for those Purposes; and for the making and filing of Affidavits of Articles of Clerkship. (Repealed by Statute Law Revision Act 1867 (30 & 31 Vict. c. 59))
Bread Act 1762 (repealed)	3 Geo. 3. c. 6	24 March 1763
An Act for explaining and amending an Act, made in the Thirty-first Year of the Reign of His late Majesty King George the Second, intituled, "An Act for the due making of Bread, and to regulate the Price and Assize thereof, and to punish Persons who shall adulterate Meal, Flour, or Bread," (Note: Making of Bread Act 1757 (31 Geo. 2. c. 29)) so far as the same relates to that Part of Great Britain called Scotland; and for rendering the said Act more effectual in that Part of the United Kingdom. (Repealed by Statute Law Revision Act 1867 (30 & 31 Vict. c. 59))
Mutiny Act 1762 (repealed)	3 Geo. 3. c. 7	24 March 1763
An Act for punishing Mutiny and Desertion, and for the better Payment of the Army and their Quarters. (Repealed by Statute Law Revision Act 1867 (30 & 31 Vict. c. 59))
Privileges of Exercising Trades Act 1762 (repealed)	3 Geo. 3. c. 8	24 March 1763
An Act to enable such Officers, Mariners, and Soldiers, as have been in the Land or Sea Service, or in the Marines, since the Twenty-second Year of His late Majesty King George the Second, (Note: Discharged Soldiers, etc. Act 1748 (22 Geo. 2. c. 44)) to exercise Trades. (Repealed by Statute Law Revision Act 1867 (30 & 31 Vict. c. 59))
National Debt Act 1762 (repealed)	3 Geo. 3. c. 9	24 March 1763
An Act for granting Annuities, to satisfy certain Navy, Victualing, and Transport Bills, and Ordnance Debentures; and for charging the Payment of such Annuities on the Sinking Fund, and making good the same to the said Fund, in Manner therein mentioned. (Repealed by Statute Law Revision Act 1870 (33 & 34 Vict. c. 69))
Militia Pay, etc. Act 1762 (repealed)	3 Geo. 3. c. 10	24 March 1763
An Act for applying the Money granted in this Session of Parliament, for defraying the Charge of the Pay and Cloathing of the Militia, in that Part of Great Britain called England, for One Year, beginning the Twenty-fifth Day of March, One Thousand Seven Hundred and Sixty-three; and for appointing a Time and Place for exercising the Militia in the said Year. (Repealed by Statute Law Revision Act 1867 (30 & 31 Vict. c. 59))
Bread (No. 2) Act 1762 (repealed)	3 Geo. 3. c. 11	24 March 1763
An Act for explaining and amending an Act, made in the Thirty-first Year of the Reign of His late Majesty King George the Second, intituled, "An Act for the due making of Bread, and to regulate the Price and Assize thereof; and to punish Persons who shall adulterate Meal, Flour, or Bread." (Repealed by London Bread Trade Act 1815 (55 Geo. 3. c. xcix) and Bread Act 1819 (59 Geo. 3. c. 36))
National Debt (No. 2) Act 1762 (repealed)	3 Geo. 3. c. 12	31 March 1763
An Act for granting to His Majesty several additional Duties upon Wines imported into this Kingdom, and certain Duties upon all Cyder and Perry; and for raising the Sum of Three Millions Five Hundred Thousand Pounds, by Way of Annuities and Lotteries, to be charged on the said Duties. (Repealed by Statute Law Revision Act 1870 (33 & 34 Vict. c. 69))
Malt Duties Act 1762 (repealed)	3 Geo. 3. c. 13	31 March 1763
An Act for more effectually securing the payment of this duties upon malt, by preventing frauds in the obtaining of allowances, and the mixing of fresh corn or grain with corn or grain making into malt. (Repealed by Statute Law Revision Act 1867 (30 & 31 Vict. c. 59))
Discovery of Longitude at Sea Act 1762 or the Discovery of Longitude at Sea (John Harrison) Act 1763 (repealed)	3 Geo. 3. c. 14	31 March 1763
An Act for the Encouragement of John Harrison to publish and make known his Invention of a Machine, or Watch, for the Discovery of the Longitude at Sea. (Repealed by Statute Law Revision Act 1867 (30 & 31 Vict. c. 59))

=== Private acts ===
Short title	Citation	Royal assent
Long title
Henry Fox Oaths of Office Act 1762	3 Geo. 3. c. 1 Pr.	21 December 1762
An Act to enable the Right Honourable Henry Fox to take, in Great Britain, the Oaths of Office, as Writer of the Tallies and Counter-Tallies, and Clerk of the Pells, in the Receipt of the Exchequer in the Kingdom of Ireland, and to qualify himself for the Enjoyment of the said Offices.
Meyer's Naturalization Act 1762	3 Geo. 3. c. 2 Pr.	21 December 1762
An Act for naturalizing Jeremiah Meyer.
Meulen's Naturalization Act 1762	3 Geo. 3. c. 3 Pr.	21 December 1762
An Act for naturalizing John Vander Meulen.
Naturalization of Adolph Boon, James des Cotes, Anthony Haldimaud, Samuel Bouess and John Faesch.	3 Geo. 3. c. 4 Pr.	21 December 1762
An Act for naturalizing Adolph Boon, James Des Cotes, Anthony Francis Haldimand, Samuel Bouess, and John Werner Faesch.
Naturalization of David Wolpman, John Siri, Francis Fatio, David Plantier, William Stafford and Francis Delon.	3 Geo. 3. c. 5 Pr.	21 December 1762
An Act for naturalizing David Wolpman, John Siri, Francis Philip Fatio, David Plantier, William Stafford, and Francis Delon.

=== Sources ===
- Pickering, Danby, ed. (1763). "Anno tertio Georgii III". The Statutes at Large. Vol. 25. Joseph Bentham. pp. 229–364 – via Internet Archive.
- "Anno tertio Georgii III". The Statutes at Large. Vol. 25. Joseph Bentham. 1763. pp. 229–364 – via Google Books.
- Pickering, Danby, ed. (1763). "Anno tertio Georgii III". The Statutes at Large. Vol. 25. Joseph Bentham. pp. 229–364 – via Internet Archive.
- Journals of the House of Commons. Vol. 29. London: His Majesty's Stationery Office. 1803. pp. 353–666 – via Google Books.
- Chronological Table of and Index to the Statutes. Vol. 1: To the End of the Session 59 Vict. Sess. 2 (1895) (13th ed.). London: Her Majesty's Stationery Office. 1896. p. 121 – via Google Books.

== See also ==
- List of acts of the Parliament of Great Britain
