= St. Paul's Church, Newport =

St. Paul's Church, Newport may refer to:

- St. Paul's Church, Newport (South Wales)
- St. Paul's Church, Newport (Isle of Wight)
