= Jedburgh Old Parish Church =

Coordinates: 55.478°N 2.557°W

- Jedburgh and Oxnam Parish Church
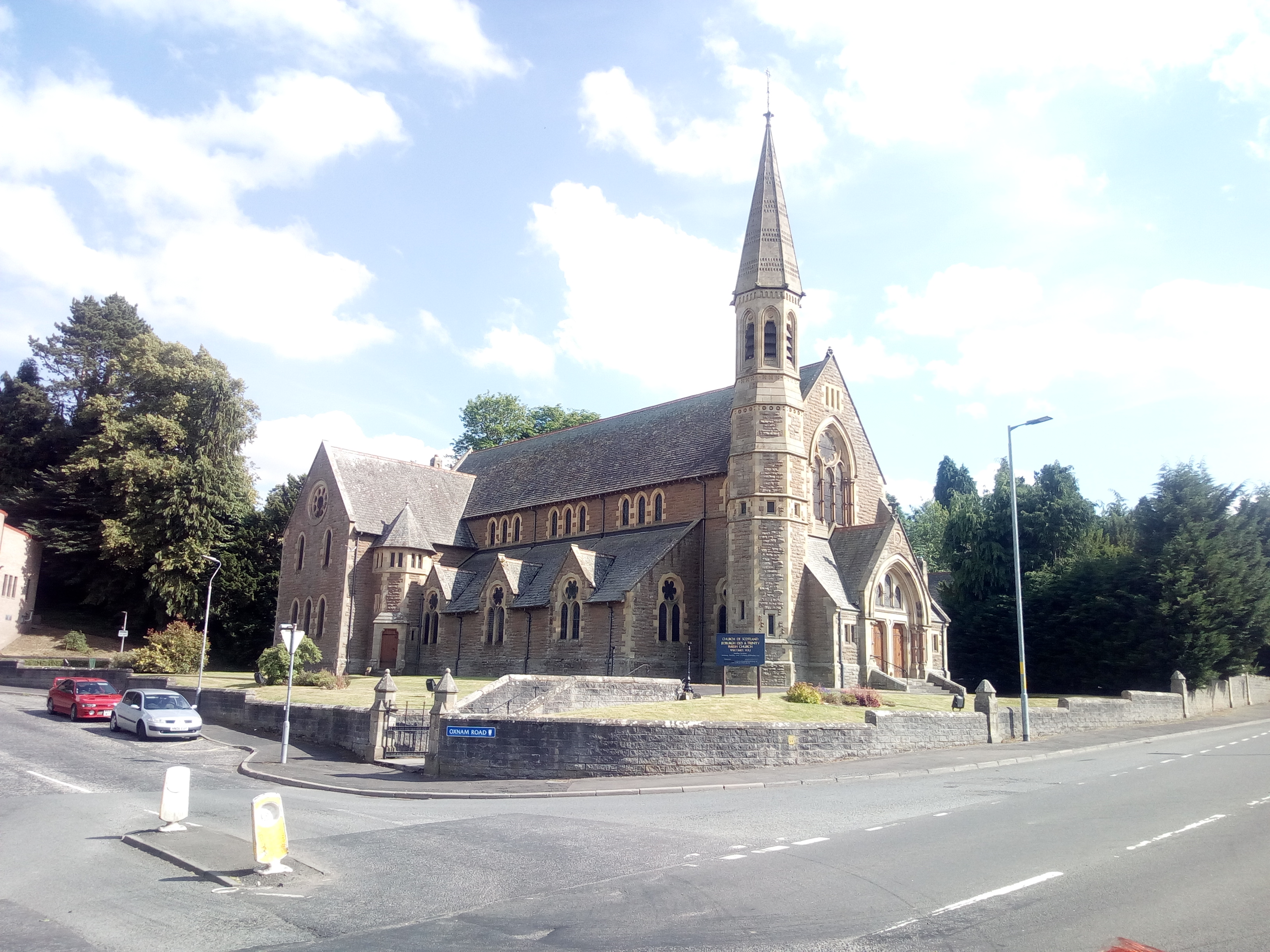
- Jedburgh and Oxnam Parish Church

- Location in the Scottish Borders
- Location: Jedburgh
- Country: Scotland
- Denomination: Church of Scotland

History
- Status: Active
- Founded: 1875
- Founder: Schomberg Kerr

Architecture
- Heritage designation: Category A listed
- Architect: Thomas Henry Wyatt
- Completed: 1875
- Construction cost: £11,000

Jedburgh Old Parish Church is a Presbyterian Church of Scotland church building in the Scottish town of Jedburgh in the Scottish Borders council area. In 1993, the building was added to the Scottish Register of Historic Monuments at the highest level of listed buildings, Category A.

== History ==
Since the 12th century, Jedburgh Abbey has been Jedburgh's principal building. During the Scottish Reformation around 1560, the abbey was dissolved. The abbey church then served as the parish church. After the former abbey church had become both dilapidated and too small for the growing congregation by the 1870s, a new church was built.

Schomberg Kerr, 9th Marquess of Lothian, provided both money and land for this project. Construction began in 1872 and was completed in 1875. The Anglo-Irish architect Thomas Henry Wyatt was responsible for the design. The first service was held in the new church on 11 April that year. In 1769 James MacKnight became the church's second minister and in the same year MacKnight was elected to be the Moderator of the Church of Scotland.

An extension in 1888 was designed by the Scottish architect Hippolyte Blanc.

In 1993 the main building and its gate piers became a category A listed building. .

== Description ==
The church building is located at the junction of Oxnam Road and Newcastle Road (A68) to the south of Jedburgh. It is built of embossed stone blocks of dark sandstone with details in cream-coloured sandstone. The church is on a corner plot with the manse behind it. It has an ornamented entrance looking out onto the A68 and at the corner is a three-storey octagonal bell tower. Side aisles with dormers are on the nave's sides.
