= Westry =

Village in Cambridgeshire, England

Coordinates: 52.569°N 0.060°E

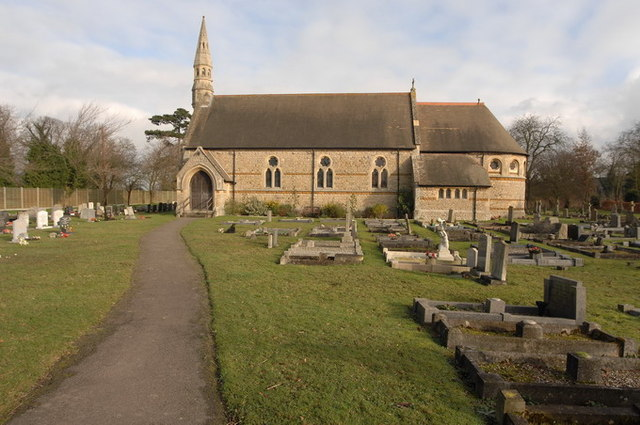
St Mary's Church and Churchyard before the arson

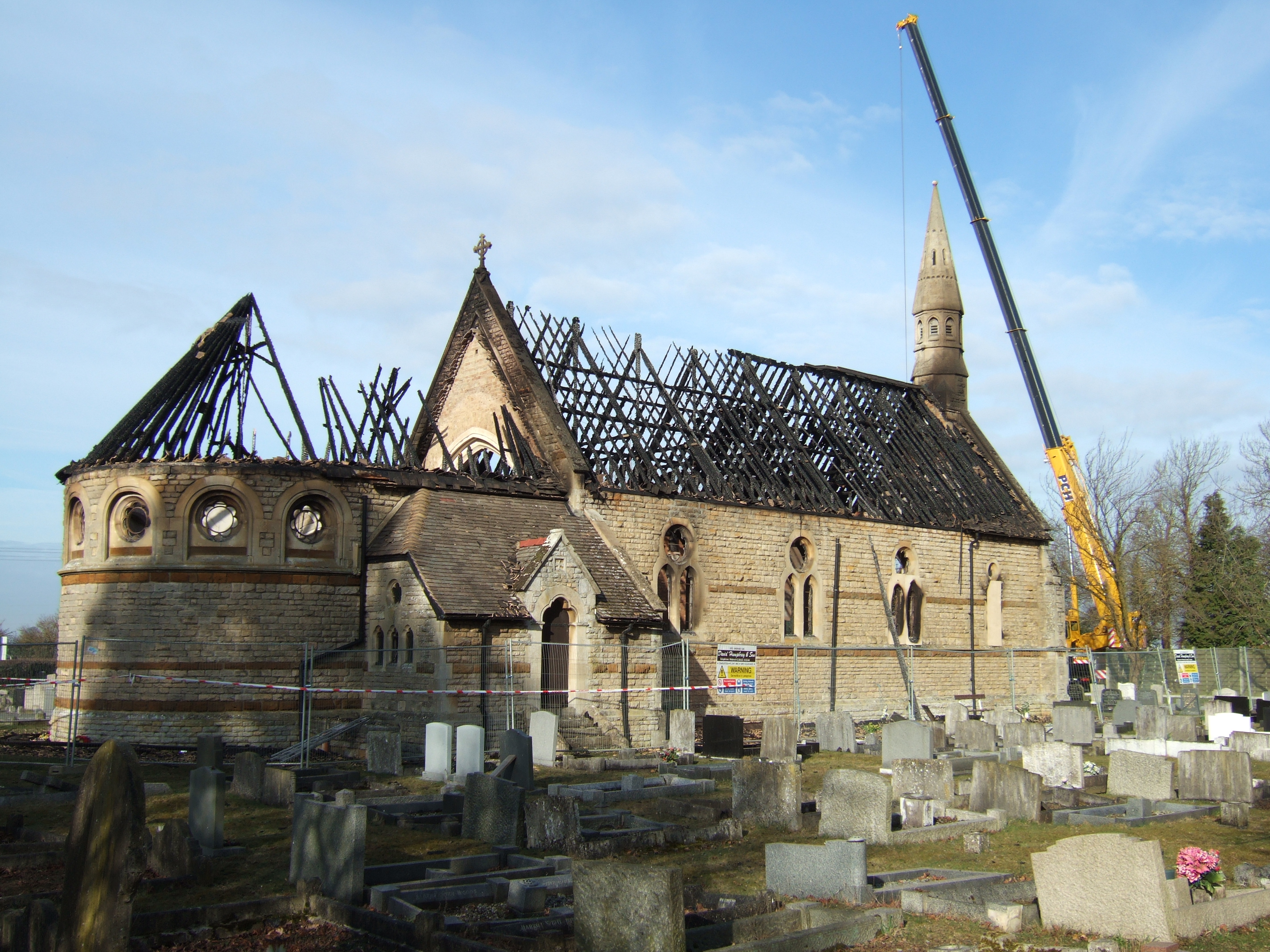
St Mary's on the day after the fire

Westry is a village in Cambridgeshire, England. It lies to the northwest of March on the A141 to Wisbech.

The Church of St Mary was erected in 1873 to a design by Thomas Henry Wyatt. It is a Grade II listed building. The church was gutted by fire in an arson attack on 15 March 2010 but reopened in 2014 after its insurers paid for a £2.2m renovation.
