= St Paul's Church, Salisbury =

Church in Salisbury, Wiltshire, England

Coordinates: 51.0720°N 1.8039°W

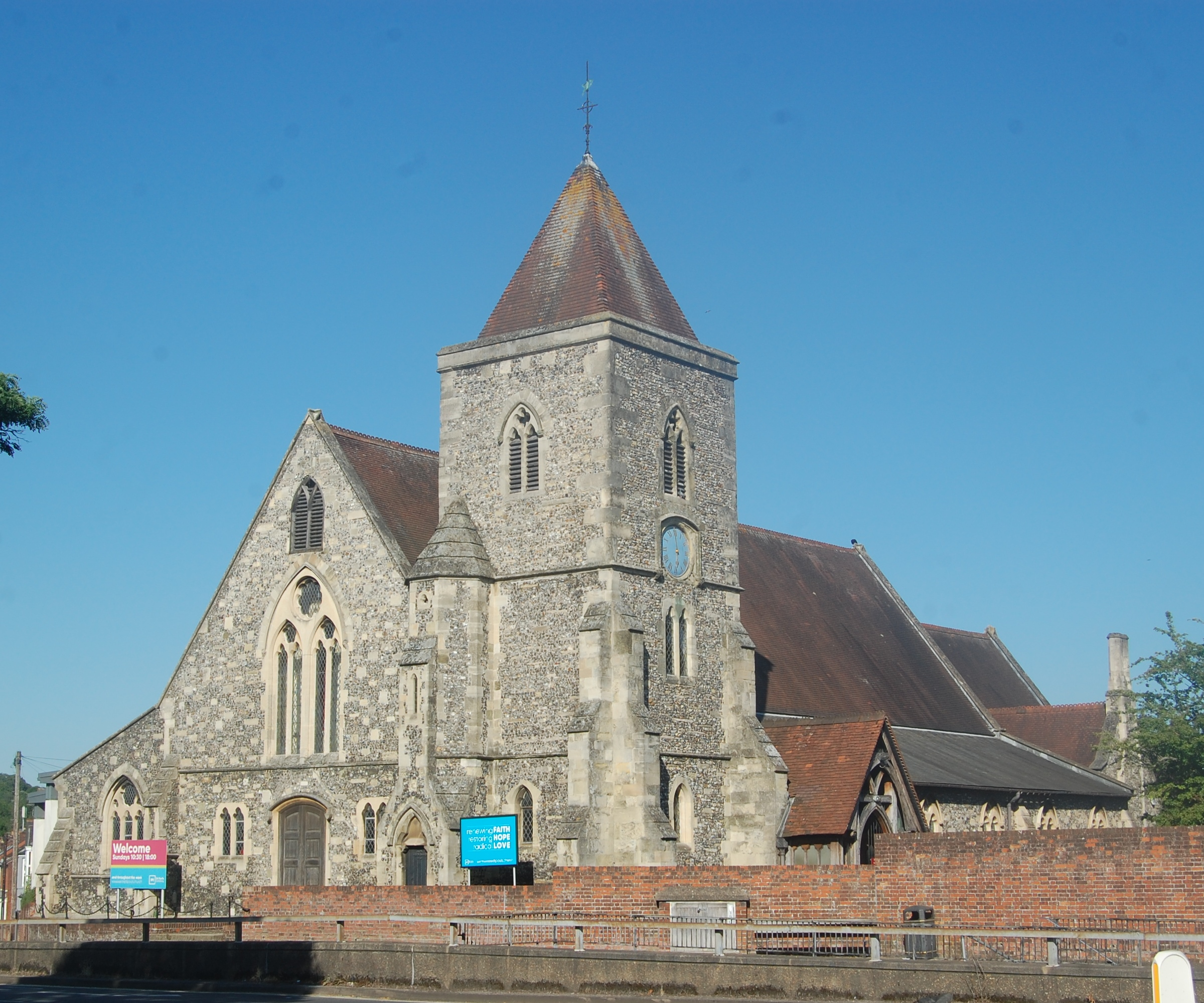
- The church in July 2022
- St Paul's Church, Salisbury
- Location: Fisherton Street, Salisbury, Wiltshire, SP2 7QW
- Country: England
- Denomination: Church of England
- Churchmanship: Evangelical
- Website: www.stpaulssalisbury.org

History
- Status: Active
- Founded: 1851
- Consecrated: 1853

Architecture
- Functional status: Parish church
- Heritage designation: Grade II listed
- Designated: 12 October 1972
- Architect: Thomas Henry Wyatt
- Architectural type: Decorated Gothic Revival
- Years built: 1851–53
- Completed: 1853

Administration
- Province: Canterbury
- Diocese: Salisbury
- Archdeaconry: Sarum
- Deanery: Salisbury
- Parish: Fisherton Anger St Paul

St Paul's Church, Salisbury, England, is the Church of England parish church for Fisherton Anger, serving part of the northern suburbs of the city. It was consecrated in 1853 and lies north-west of the city centre, near the railway station. The congregation is affiliated to the Evangelical Alliance. The church is a Grade II listed building.

== Predecessor church ==
Fisherton rectory is first mentioned in 1319, and a church dedicated to St Clement is mentioned in 1324. It stood close to the Nadder and Fisherton Mill, half a mile north-west of the cathedral at grid reference SU 137 300. Largely built of flint, it had a west tower to which a belfry stage had been added in the 15th or 16th century. The church was described in c.1824 as an "unassuming village church".

St Clement's was demolished in 1852 when it was superseded by St Paul's, and its site and graveyard were made into a small park which remains an open space today. From 2015 to 2022 a community interest company managed the "secret garden" for the benefit of wildlife, on behalf of Salisbury City Council, with support from Wiltshire Council. As of 2023, volunteers continue to tend the garden.

== Construction ==
As the population of the area grew, around 1850 a decision was made to replace the old church, probably at the instigation of William Corbin Finch. The Finch family had bought Fisherton House earlier in that century and operated it as a private lunatic asylum; Finch had been Mayor of Salisbury in 1842–1843.

A site was chosen about 300m north of St Clements, near the junction of the Wilton and Devizes roads. The London architect T.H. Wyatt designed a flint and stone church in the style of c.1300, which was consecrated in 1853. Some masonry came from the old church, including some piers and arches, and the tower was built with the same dimensions so that the bells and bell-frame could be re-used. As built, the church had a chancel, a wide nave with an aisle, a tower at the south-west corner with a pyramidal roof, and a south porch. Julian Orbach, in his update of Nikolaus Pevsner's Buildings of England volume, calls the stair-turret on the west front of the tower "quirky". A north aisle was added in 1876.

Six bells were brought from St Clement's, and they were supplemented by two trebles in 1949. Today, the oldest bells in the peal are from 1609 and 1616.

The building was designated as Grade II listed in 1972. Flat-roofed church rooms with exteriors of white piers and plate glass were added on the north side in 2009.

== Interior ==
The plain circular font dating from the 12th or 13th century was brought from St Clement's.

== Parish ==
The parish retains the name Fisherton Anger; the civil parish with the same name was absorbed by Salisbury in 1904. In 1938 a northern part of the parish was transferred to form part of a new district of St Michael, although the church serving that part of Bemerton suburb was not completed until 1957.

The parish registers from 1654 (christenings and marriages) and 1653 (burials), other than those in current use, are held in the Wiltshire and Swindon Record Office.

== Faith ==
The congregation of St Paul's is aligned with the Evangelical Alliance and the New Wine Network. The style of worship in the parish has been evangelical since the time of Rev. A. B. Handley (1864–73), and was continued by E. N. Thwaites (until 1919), W. C. Procter (to 1917), and H. M. Allen (to 1930).

== Amenities ==
As well as the rooms in the 21st-century building attached to the church, the parish has offices in a detached building next to the church, and a three-storey purpose-built community centre known as the Hope Centre on the other side of Fisherton Street. There is a pedestrian route between the two sites via the subways under the roundabout.
