= Thomas Henry Wyatt =

Anglo-Irish architect (1807–1880)

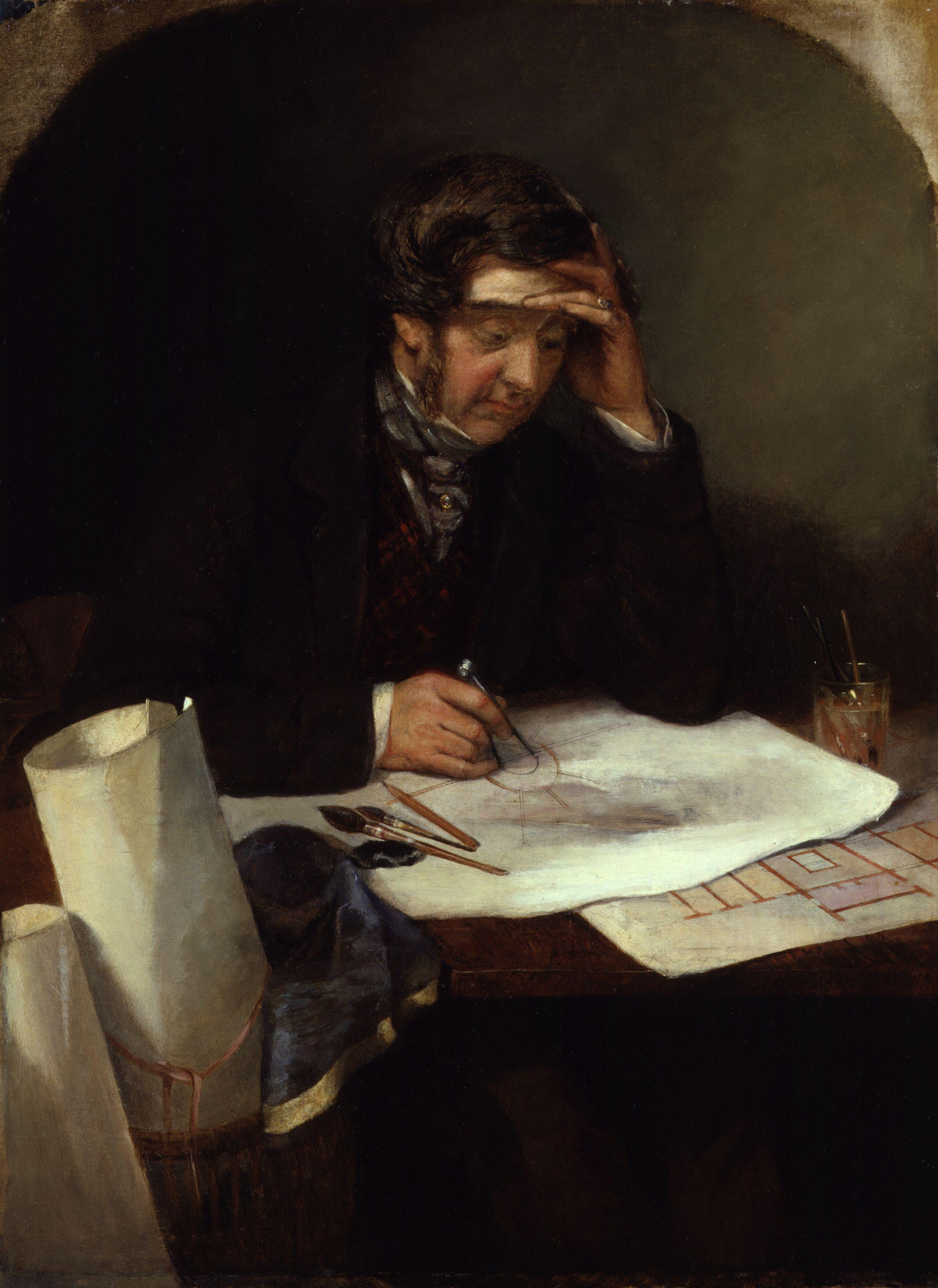
- Thomas Henry Wyatt by George Landseer
- Born: 9 May 1807; Loughglinn House, County Roscommon
- Died: 5 August 1880 (aged 73); London
- Occupation: Architect
- Spouse: Arabella Montagu Wyatt
- Awards: Royal Gold Medal (1873)

Thomas Henry Wyatt (9 May 1807 – 5 August 1880) was an Anglo-Irish architect. He had a prolific and distinguished career, being elected president of the Royal Institute of British Architects for 1870–1873 and being awarded its Royal Gold Medal for Architecture in 1873. His reputation during his lifetime was largely as a safe establishment figure, and critical assessment has been less favourable more recently, particularly in comparison with his younger brother, Matthew Digby Wyatt.

== Personal and family life ==
Wyatt was born at Lough-Glin House, County Roscommon. His father was Matthew Wyatt (1773–1831), a barrister and police magistrate for Roscommon and Lambeth. Wyatt is presumed to have moved to Lambeth with his father in 1825, and then initially embarked on a career as a merchant sailing to the Mediterranean, particularly Malta.

He married his first cousin Arabella Montagu Wyatt (1807–1875), the second daughter of his uncle Arthur who was an agent to the Duke of Beaufort. This consolidated Wyatt's practice in Wales.

He lived at and practised from 77 Great Russell Street. He died there on 5 August 1880, and is buried at St Lawrence's Church, Weston Patrick, Hampshire.

The Wyatts were a significant architectural dynasty during the eighteenth and nineteenth centuries.

== Career ==
Wyatt's early training was in the office of Philip Hardwick where he worked until 1832, and was involved in work on Goldsmiths Hall, Euston station and the warehouses at St Katharine Docks. He began practice on his own account in 1832 when he was appointed District Surveyor for Hackney (a post he held until 1861). By 1838 he had acquired substantial patronage from the Duke of Beaufort, the Earl of Denbigh and Sidney Herbert, and David Brandon joined him as a partner. This partnership lasted until 1851. Wyatt's son Matthew (1840–1892) became his father's partner in 1860.

=== Positions ===
Wyatt was appointed as consulting or honorary architect to a number of bodies, including:

- the Institution of Civil Engineers
- The Athenaeum
- Governesses Benevolent Association
- Middlesex Hospital
- Lunacy Commissioners
- Incorporated Church Building Society
- Diocese of Salisbury

== Architectural works ==
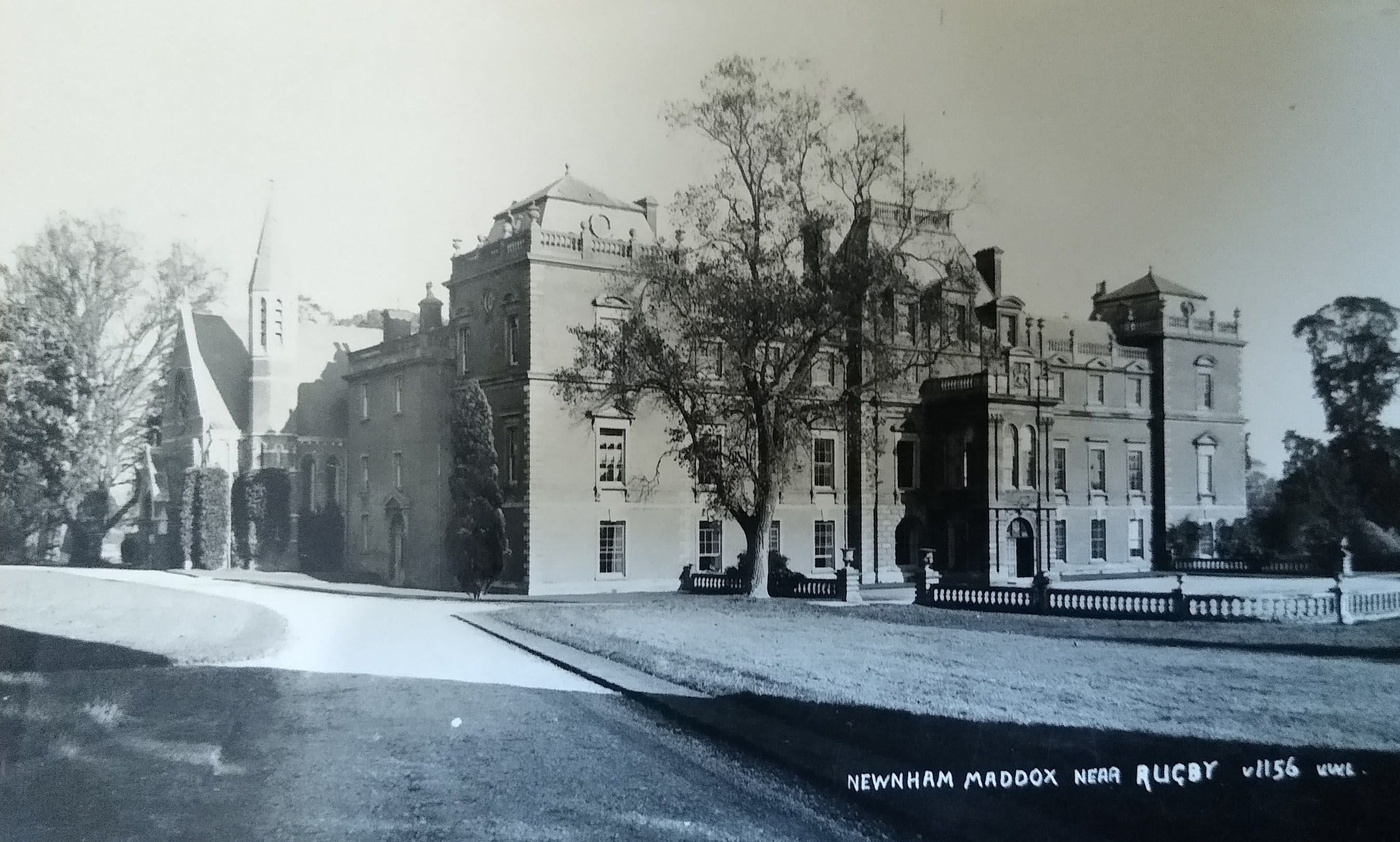
Newnham Paddox House in Warwickshire, designed by Wyatt for the Earl of Denbigh, built 1876-79, demolished 1952

Wyatt worked in many styles, ranging from the Italianate of Wilton through to the Gothic of many of his churches. His practice was extensive, with much work in Wiltshire, largely as a result of his official position and the patronage of the Herbert family; and in Monmouthshire, through the Beaufort connection.

Many of his over 400 buildings have since been demolished.

=== Wiltshire ===
Wyatt secured much work in Wiltshire, including the building of 20 churches, after offering his services at no cost to the Salisbury Diocesan Church Building Association in 1836. Julian Orbach considers the large new church at Wilton – "on a heroic scale" – to have made Wyatt's reputation.

Below is a selective list of some of Wyatt's major works.

==== Churches ====
Date	Name	Location	Notes
1836–38	Christchurch	Shaw	since rebuilt
1839–40	Christ Church	Derry Hill	with Brandon
1843	St Mary	Codford St Mary	
1843	St Mary and St Nicholas	Wilton	
1843	Holy Trinity	Crockerton	
1843	Christ Church	Worton	with Brandon
1844	Holy Trinity	Dilton Marsh	
1844	St John the Baptist	Horningsham	with Brandon, body of church
1844	St Andrew	Newton Tony	with Brandon
1845	All Saints	Woodford	
1845	St Mary	Chittoe	
1845	St Michael	Melksham	
1845	St Alfred the Great	Monkton Deverill	older tower
1846	St John the Evangelist	West Ashton	
1847	All Saints	Westbury	alterations, west window
1840–50	St Nicholas	Cholderton	with Brandon
1849–50	St Martin	Salisbury	with Brandon, restoration
1851	Christchurch	Cadley, Savernake	
1851	All Saints	Charlton-All-Saints	
1851–53	St Paul	Fisherton Anger, Salisbury	
1852	St Michael	Hilperton	
1853	St Mary	Maddington	
1854	All Saints	West Harnham	
1854	All Saints	Burbage	south aisle 1876
1854–55	St Andrew	Nunton	
1855	St Mary	Shrewton	
1851–53	St Paul's	Salisbury	
1856	St Andrew	Littleton Drew	
1857	St Nicholas	Berwick Bassett	
1858	St Andrew	Laverstock	
1858	Holy Trinity	Stourpaine	
1860–61	St John	Bemerton	built for the Pembrokes of Wilton
1860	St Mary	Boyton	restoration
1850–61	St Mary Magdalene	Woodborough	rebuilding
1861	St Katherine	Savernake Forest	
1862	All Saints	Sutton Mandeville	
1862	St Andrew	South Newton	
1862	St Nicholas	North Bradley	
1862–63	SS Peter & Paul	Marlborough	
1863	All Saints	Chitterne	
1863–64	St Giles	Wishford	
1864	St Nicholas	Little Langford	
1866	All Saints	Winterslow	
1866	St Mary	Alvediston	
1866	Holy Trinity	Fonthill Gifford	
1867–68	St Michael	Winterbourne Earls	
1868	St Michael	Little Bedwyn	vestry and restoration
1871	Christ Church	Warminster	
1875	St Mary	Upavon	
1875	St Leonard	Semley	
1878	St John the Baptist	Hindon	
1879	All Saints	Fonthill Bishop	

==== Houses ====
Date	Name	Location	Notes
1848	Rectory, St. Mary	Broughton Gifford	

==== Public buildings ====
Date	Name	Location	Notes
1835	Assize Courts	Devizes	
1851	Roundway Hospital	Devizes	
1878	The Bleeck Memorial Hall	Warminster	Warminster Athenaeum

=== Monmouthshire ===
The Hendre was built in 1837/9 near Monmouth for the Rolls family.

Llantarnam Abbey was built in 1834/1835 for Reginald Blewitt: a large mansion in the Elizabethan style, built on a dissolution site. Once again an abbey, in possession of the Sisters of St. Joseph.

The Church of St Thomas the Martyr, Monmouth was renovated by Wyatt.

Usk Sessions House was built in 1875–1877.

Other works:

Churches	Houses	Public Buildings	Other
1835/6 St Paul's Church, Newport; 1842 Holy Trinity, Abergavenny; 1842/43 St Mary, Llanfair Gilcoed; 1845/6 St Peter Goetre; 1846 St Dingat Dingestow; 1848/9 St Michael Glascoed; 1847/48 St Catherine Govilon; 1867/8 Church of St Cadoc, Raglan, Monmouthshire	1838 Malpas Court, Newport; 1838 Llandogo Priory; 1858?? Cefntilla Court, Llandenny	1869 National School Goetre	1877 Club, Monmouth

=== London ===
==== Knightsbridge Barracks ====
The Knightsbridge Barracks were built in 1878/9.

==== Other ====
Churches	Houses	Public Buildings	Other
1840/1 St Andrew, Bethnal Green; 1846/7 St Matthias Bethnal Green; 1850 Holy Trinity, Haverstock Hill; 1863 St George's Garrison Church, Woolwich	1845 25/26, Kensington Palace Gardens; 1870 Mansion, Park Lane; 1871/3 Mansion Berkeley Street	1879 Consumption Hospital, Brompton	1841–48 City of London and Tower Hamlets Cemetery; 1858 Adelphi Theatre

=== Somerset ===
Churches	Houses	Public Buildings	Other
1846 St James, East Cranmore	1855–6 Orchardleigh House, Nr Frome; 1858 Sutton Court, Stowey; 1877 North Perrott Manor House		1878 North Perrott; 1862–1864 Cranmore Tower, Cranmore

=== Cambridgeshire ===
Churches	Houses	Public Buildings	Other
1872 St John, March; 1880 St Peter, March; 1872 St. Mary-in-the-Fen, Westry; 1872 St. Peter, Wimblington		1842 Assize Courts, Cambridge	

=== Lancashire including Liverpool ===
Churches	Houses	Public Buildings	Other
1875 St Michael, Dalton		1864–67 New Liverpool Exchange (rebuilt 1939)	

=== Glamorgan and rest of Wales ===
Churches	Houses	Public Buildings	Other
1838 St Mary's Church, Glyntaff; 1851/2 Merthyr Tydfil; 1855/6 Glanogwen, Llanllechid, Caernarfonshire	Hensol Castle; Nantlys, Tremeirchion		

=== Herefordshire ===
Churches	Houses	Public Buildings	Other
1877 St Andrew, Bredenbury	1873 Bredenbury Court, Hereford		

=== Hampshire ===
Churches	Houses	Public Buildings	Other
1849 St Thomas, Woolton Hill; 1868 St Lawrence, Weston Patrick; 1869 St Leonard, Oakley; 1875 St Matthew, Otterbourne	1869 Brockenhurst House	1868 Town Hall, Ringwood; 1873 Hall, Winchester Castle	

=== Gloucestershire ===
Churches	Houses	Public Buildings	Other
1853 St Mary, Acton Turville; 1855 St Peter, Pilning, South Gloucestershire; 1850 St John the Baptist Old Sodbury; 1853 St Mary Magdalene Tormarton S porch; 1855 St Johns West Littleton; 1841/70 Holy Trinity Long Newnton; 1864/65 St John the Baptist Shipton Moyne; 1872 St Michael Didmarton	1838/51 Badminton House minor alterations; 1876 Lypiatt Park additions; Estcourt Park billiard room (demolished)		

=== Elsewhere ===
Churches	Houses	Public Buildings	Other
1843/4 St George, New Wolverton, Buckinghamshire; 1845 St. Andrew, Greensted, Essex alterations; 1847/9 St Peter, Stanton Lacy, Shropshire; 1849 St. Mary's Church, Atherstone, Warwickshire, restoration; 1851/2 St Michael, Brynford, Flintshire; 1865 St Michael and All Angels Church, Abbeyleix; 1867 St Bartholomew's Church, Dublin; 1867 St Margaret's Church, Horsmonden, Kent: restoration; 1872 Jedburgh Old Parish Church; 1876 Holy Trinity, Martin, Lincolnshire; 1876/77 St Luke's Church, West Orchard, Dorset; 1877 Holy Cross, Swainby, North Riding of Yorkshire; 1878 St Mary, Stalbridge, Dorset, complete restoration	1841+ Westerdale Hall, Yorks; 1860 Carlett Park, Cheshire; 1874 Jedburgh Old Parish Church Manse; 1873 Palmela "Conceição Velha" House, Cascais (Lisbon), Portugal; 1875 Barcote Manor, Buckland, Berkshire; 1876–79 Newnham Paddox House, Warwickshire; Westerdale Hall, February 2008	1822 Bridge over the River Windrush, Witney, Oxon; 1850/3 St Johns Hospital, Buckinghamshire	

== Bibliography ==
- Robinson, John Martin (1979). The Wyatts, an Architectural Dynasty. Oxford University Press. ISBN 9780198173403.

== See also ==
- Wyatt family
