= St Paul's Church, Newport, Wales =

Church in South Wales, Wales

St Paul's Church
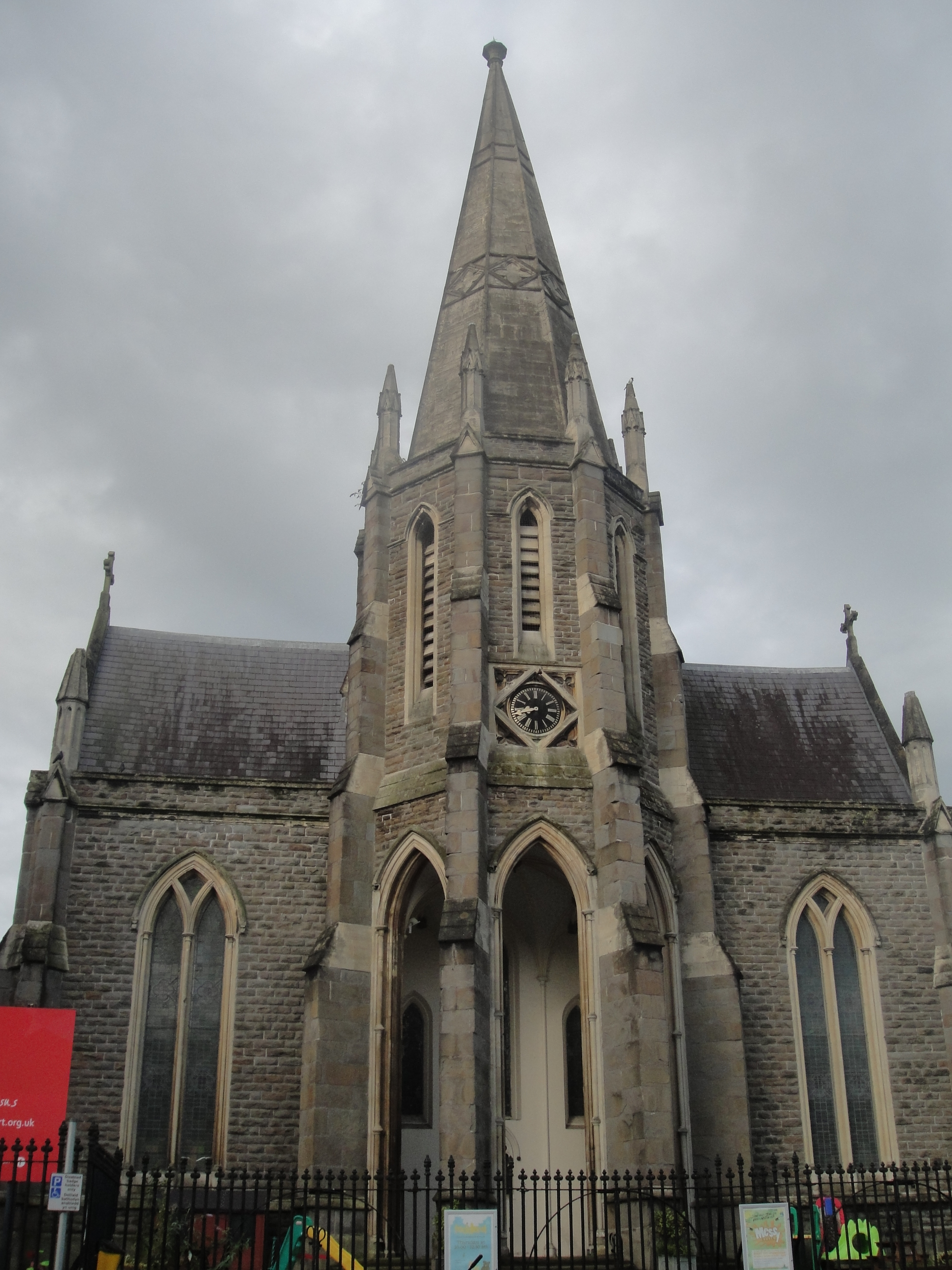
- St Paul's Church, 2015
- St Paul's Church
- 51.583°N 2.993°W
- Denomination: Church in Wales
- Website: St Paul's Church website (archived)

History
- Dedication: Paul the Apostle

Architecture
- Functional status: Closed
- Heritage designation: Grade II listed building
- Designated: 2 May 1980 (modified 31 March 2000)
- Architect: Thomas Henry Wyatt or Sir Matthew Digby Wyatt
- Style: Georgian Early English Gothic
- Years built: 1835–36
- Construction cost: £5,000
- Closed: 2016

Administration
- Parish: St Paul, St Stephen & Holy Trinity (former)

St Paul's Church is a Grade II listed building in Commercial Street in the city centre of Newport, South Wales, built in Victorian gothic style in 1835–36. It was a parish church of the Church in Wales in the Diocese of Monmouth until 2016, when the congregation moved leaving the building vacant. It was sold in 2018.

== History ==
The church was built in 1835–36 at a cost of £5,000, with fittings bringing the total to more than £7,000. The land was donated by Sir Charles Morgan, 2nd Baronet, whose family continued as pew-holders and benefactors of the church and parish. Built to seat 1000 people, it was the first church in the town, and became a parish church in the Diocese of Llandaff in 1839. A vicarage hall was added on the grounds of the vicarage in 1879; the church closed in 1991, but after reopening and modern renovations, the hall was combinable with the worship area to make a hall with a capacity of 300.

St Paul's was designated a Grade II listed building on 2 May 1980. In 2016, the congregation moved to a leased building on Bridge Street; it later merged with St Stephen's in Pillgwenlly, in the latter's building. St Paul's church was left vacant and was sold in 2018. In December 2021, an application was submitted to divide the interior into 20 flats; this was rejected in February 2022 after objections from the Georgian Group and the Victorian Society.

== Building ==
The church is attributed to Thomas Henry Wyatt, but the newspaper account of the consecration refers only to "Mr Wyatt" being present, and Pryce's history of the church states that the architect was Sir Matthew Digby Wyatt.

Constructed of rock-faced coursed stone with ashlar dressings, the church is in Georgian Early English Gothic style, a rare example in Wales of the "Gothick" period that pre-dated the Victorian Gothic revival. At the East end facing Commercial Street is an octagonal clock tower with spire. The ceiling was added in 1842 and the church was refurbished in 1859 by G. Clarke of Newport, then redecorated with new porches by Habershon and Fawckner in 1888.

=== Stained glass ===
- Christ the Good Shepherd, the Good Samaritan and Christ Blessing Children (lancets, East end)
