= Fisherton Street =

Street in Salisbury, England

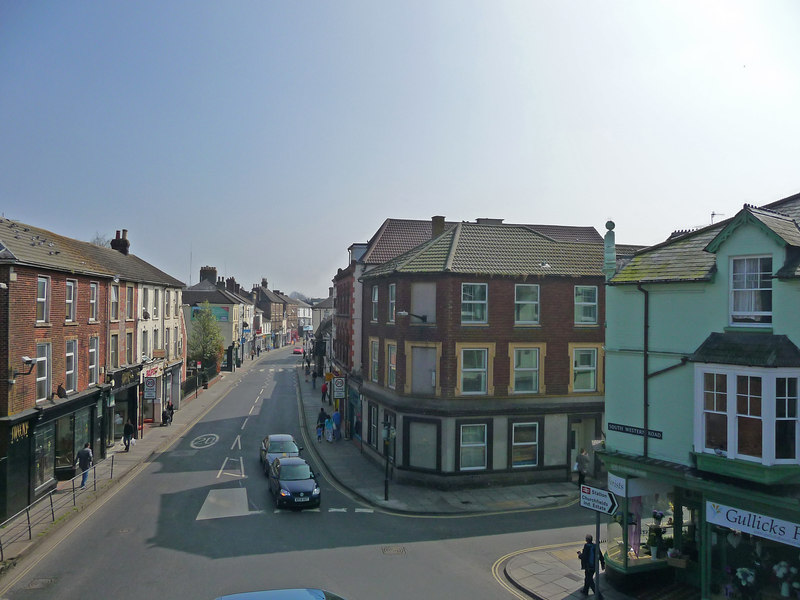
Fisherton Street seen from the railway bridge

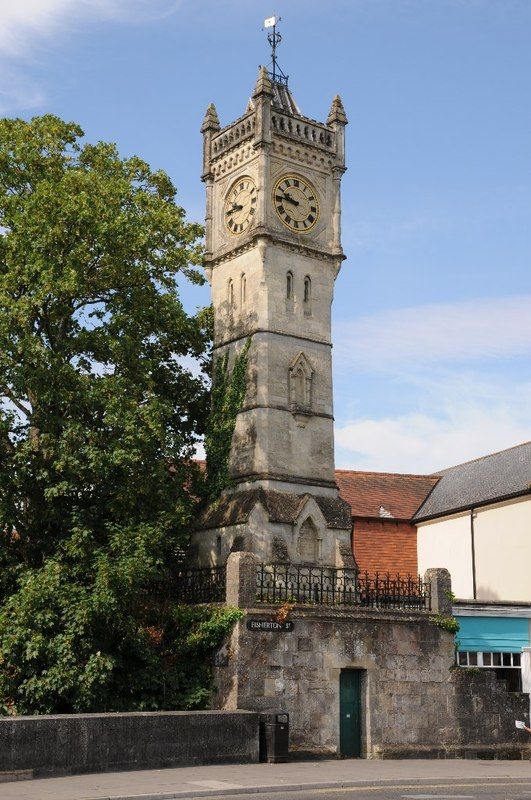
The clock tower seen from the bridge over the River Avon

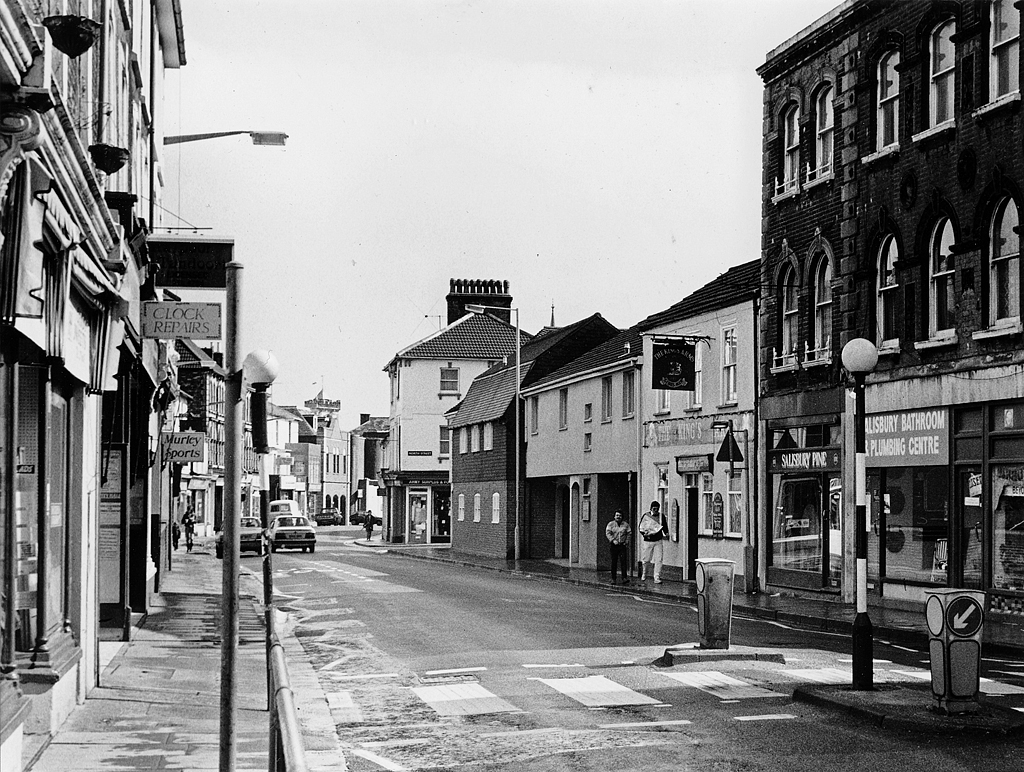
Fisherton Street in 1986

Fisherton Street is in the city of Salisbury in the English county of Wiltshire. On the western side of the city, it is primarily a commercial street. It runs eastwards from Wilton Road towards the city centre. After crossing the River Avon on Fisherton Bridge it becomes Bridge Street.

The street's name derives from the fact that it connected Salisbury city with the nearby village of Fisherton Anger, then a mile or so from the city centre but now part of the city.

Notable buildings include the former Georgian era Salisbury Infirmary, now in residential use as Pembroke House; the Victorian Clock Tower; the King's Head Hotel; and St Paul's Church. Salisbury railway station is close to the street and was at first known as Fisherton Street to distinguish it from the now closed Milford station.

== Bibliography ==
- Burnett, David. Salisbury: The History of an English Cathedral City. Compton Press, 1978.
- Pevsner, Nikolaus Cherry, Bridget . Wiltshire. Yale University Press, 2002.
- Rabbitts, Paul & Gordon, Liz. Salisbury in 50 Buildings. Amberley Publishing Limited, 2021.
