= Breeze Hill =

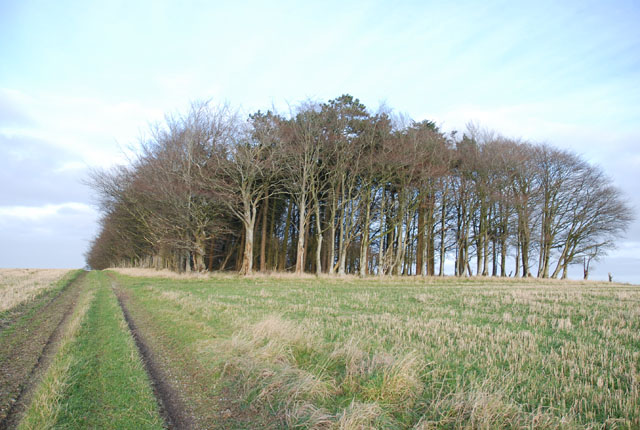
- Clump on Breeze Hill

Highest point
- Elevation: 262 m (860 ft)
- Coordinates: 50.983°N 2.145°W

Geography
- Location: Dorset, England
- Parent range: Cranborne Chase
- OS grid: ST899204
- Topo map: OS Landranger 184, Explorer 118N

Breeze Hill is a prominent, largely treeless, rounded summit, 262 metres high, on the edge of Cranborne Chase about a mile east of the village of Melbury Abbas, Dorset.

Breeze Hill is 2 miles northeast of Compton Abbas and some 2 1/2 miles southeast of the town of Shaftesbury. The county boundary with Wiltshire runs past the summit some 200 metres to the northeast on the upper slopes of Charlton Down. The terrain drops steeply on three sides; the ridge on the fourth side running away to the southeast and east in a gentle curve towards Win Green hill, the highest point on Cranborne Chase. On the steep western scarp is Zig Zag Hill with the hairpin bends of the B3081. Near the hill is evidence of prehistoric activity in the form of tumuli, long barrows, earthworks and cross dykes. About a mile and a half away to the west-southwest is another prominent summit, Melbury Beacon
