= List of hills of Wiltshire =

This is a list of hills in Wiltshire. Many of these hills are important historical, archaeological and nature conservation sites, as well as popular hiking and tourist destinations in the county of Wiltshire in southern England.

== Colour key ==
Class	Prominence
Marilyns	150 – 599 m
HuMPs	100 – 149 m
TuMPs	30 – 99 m
Unclassified	0 – 29 m

The table is colour-coded based on the classification or "listing" of the hill. The types that occur in Wiltshire are Marilyns, HuMPs and TuMPs, listings based on topographical prominence. "Prominence" correlates strongly with the subjective significance of a summit. Peaks with low prominences are either subsidiary tops of a higher summit or relatively insignificant independent summits. Peaks with high prominences tend to be the highest points around and likely to have extraordinary views. A Marilyn is a hill with a prominence of at least 150 metres or about 500 feet. A "HuMP" (the acronym comes from "Hundred Metre Prominence) is a hill with a prominence of at least 100 but less than 150 metres. In this table Marilyns are in beige and HuMPs in lilac. The term "sub-Marilyn" or "sub-HuMP" is used, e.g. in the online Database of British and Irish Hills to indicate hills that fall just below the threshold. To qualify for inclusion, hills must either be 200 metres or higher with a prominence of at least 30 metres, below 200 metres with a prominence of at least 90 metres (the threshold for a sub-HuMP) or be in some other way notable. In this context, a "TuMP" is a hill with a prominence of at least 30 but less than 100 metres; by way of contrast, see also the article listing Tumps (a traditional term meaning a hillock, mound, barrow or tumulus). For further information see the Lists of mountains and hills in the British Isles and the individual articles on Marilyns, HuMPs and TuMPs.

== Table ==
Hill	Height (m)	Prom. (m)	Grid ref.	Class	Parent	Range/Region	Remarks	Image
Milk Hill	294.3	147	SU104643	Hardy,sub-Marilyn, HuMP, Wiltshire county top (historical and current)	Walbury Hill	North Wessex Downs	Wiltshire's county top. Highest point of North Wessex Downs. Second highest chalk hill in the UK. Tiny cairn in middle of field may be inaccessible if crops present.	
Tan Hill	294	48	SU082647	TuMP	Walbury Hill	North Wessex Downs	Wiltshire's second highest summit. Second highest point of North Wessex Downs. No summit feature. 25 cm lower than nearby Milk Hill.	
Martinsell Hill	289	76	SU178638	TuMP	Walbury Hill	North Wessex Downs	Wiltshire's third summit. Trig point at summit. Prehistoric fort at summit	
Long Knoll	288	171	ST786376	Marilyn, HuMP, TuMP	Beacon Batch	Cranborne Chase and West Wiltshire Downs	Featureless summit 10m NE of trig point and 50 cm higher than its base.	
Brimsdown Hill	285	88	ST824391	TuMP	Long Knoll	Cranborne Chase and West Wiltshire Downs	Copse on summit. Summit is 1m higher than base of trig point 50 m S.	
Win Green	277	159	ST925206	Marilyn, HuMP, TuMP	Long Knoll	Cranborne Chase, North Wessex Downs	Copse on summit. Summit is 1m higher than base of trig point 50 m S.	
Hackpen Hill	272	104	SU129743	HuMP, TuMP	Milk Hill	Marlborough Downs, North Wessex Downs	Trig point in middle of field	
Golden Ball Hill	271	52	SU129640	TuMP	Walbury Hill	North Wessex Downs	Flat summit area; summit 2m S of fence corner	
Wexcombe Down	267	84	SU277577	TuMP	Walbury Hill	North Wessex Downs	Long barrow and water tower near summit	
Cherhill Down	262	86	SU053689	TuMP	Walbury Hill	North Wessex Downs	No summit feature; ground 5m S of fence. Oldbury Castle ramparts are as high but man-made.	
Jack's Castle	262	33	ST745354	TuMP	Long Knoll	Cranborne Chase and West Wiltshire Downs		
Morgan's Hill	260	83	SU029668	TuMP	Walbury Hill	North Wessex Downs	Toppled trig point at summit	
Haydown Hill	258	31	SU313566	TuMP	Walbury Hill	North Wessex Downs	Trig point at summit	
Little Knoll	256	52	ST807378	TuMP	Long Knoll	Cranborne Chase and West Wiltshire Downs	No summit feature; ground by fence	
Little Hill	249	87	ST868251	TuMP	Long Knoll	Cranborne Chase and West Wiltshire Downs		
Park Hill	247	65	ST825431	TuMP	Long Knoll	Cranborne Chase and West Wiltshire Downs		
Coombe Down	246	37	SU181744	TuMP	Long Knoll	Marlborough Downs, North Wessex Downs		
White Sheet Hill, Mere	245	73	ST804347	TuMP	Long Knoll	Cranborne Chase & West Wiltshire Downs		
Cley Hill	244	73	ST838448	TuMP	Long Knoll	Cranborne Chase & West Wiltshire Downs	Tumuli and fort	
Easton Hill	243	91	SU210592	TuMP, sub-HuMP	Walbury Hill	North Wessex Downs	Summit knoll	
Beacon Hill	242	59	SU210592	TuMP	Long Knoll	Cranborne Chase & West Wiltshire Downs		
Roundway Hill	242	55	SU022646	TuMP	Walbury Hill	North Wessex Downs	Site of Battle of Roundway Down, 1643	
White Sheet Hill, Swallowcliffe	242	90	ST944242	TuMP, sub-HuMP	Win Green	Cranborne Chase & West Wiltshire Downs	Summit 20m SE of trig point.	
Peaks Downs	241	34	SU264789	TuMP	Walbury Hill	North Wessex Downs	flat summit area. Close to M4 motorway	
Milton Hill	238	38	SU192584	TuMP	Walbury Hill	North Wessex Downs		
Summerslade Down	238	31	ST878379	TuMP	Long Knoll	Cranborne Chase & West Wiltshire Downs		
King's Play Hill	232	32	SU009660	TuMP	Long Knoll	Cranborne Chase & West Wiltshire Downs	Summit knoll	
White Horse Hill, Westbury	230	108	ST901511	HuMP, TuMP	Long Knoll	Salisbury Plain	Trig point at summit; flat summit area.	
Horningsham Common	229	31	ST805411	TuMP	Long Knoll	Cranborne Chase & West Wiltshire Downs	No summit feature.	
Knoyle Hill	226	30	ST898307	TuMP	Long Knoll	Cranborne Chase & West Wiltshire Downs	No summit feature.	
Tinhead Hill	226	64	ST941524	TuMP	Long Knoll	Salisbury Plain	Long barrow at ST 939524 probably higher but manmade.	
Haddon Hill	225	44	ST875316	TuMP	Long Knoll	Cranborne Chase & West Wiltshire Downs		
Sidbury Hill	223	69	SU216506	TuMP	Walbury Hill	Salisbury Plain	Trig point, fort and earthworks	
Clyffe Pypard Hill	216	30	SU074764	TuMP	Walbury Hill	North Wessex Downs	Mast near summit	
Pythouse Hill	216	32	ST909289	TuMP	Long Knoll	North Wessex Downs		
Urchfont Hill	216	89	SU040555	TuMP	Long Knoll	North Wessex Downs	Flagpole on mound summit (mound probably manmade). Ground 100m SW is lower than base of summit mound	
Barkers Hill	208	59	ST905256	TuMP	Win Green	Cranborne Chase & West Wiltshire Downs	No summit feature.	
Battlesbury Hill	208	39	ST898455	TuMP	Win Green	Cranborne Chase & West Wiltshire Downs	Hilltop fort; above Waterloo Lines	
Bathford Hill	205	101	ST791661	HuMP, TuMP	Birdlip Hill		Summit within 2m of tower (Brown's Folly)	
Woodborough Hill	205	38	SU118614	TuMP	Walbury Hill	North Wessex Downs	No summit feature; centre of flat area	
Beacon Hill, Salisbury Plain	204	88	SU194427	TuMP	Walbury Hill	Salisbury Plain	Above Bulford Camp and just N of A303; mast near summit.	
High Wood	202	50	ST941268	TuMP	Win Green	Cranborne Chase & West Wiltshire Downs	Near Old Wardour Castle	
Scratchbury Hill	197	60	ST911442	TuMP	Long Knoll	Salisbury Plain	Hillfort summit: Scratchbury Camp; trig point	
Castle Ditches	193	68	ST962284	TuMP	Win Green	Cranborne Chase & West Wiltshire Downs	Hillfort summit; trig point	
Silbury Hill	187	29	SU100685	Unclassified	Walbury Hill	North Wessex Downs	Prehistoric chalk mound	
Old Sarum	122	43	SU138326	TuMP	Walbury Hill	Salisbury Plain	Earliest settlement at Salisbury and remains of Iron Age hillfort, Norman castle and Old Sarum Cathedral	

== See also ==
- List of mountains and hills of the United Kingdom
- List of Marilyns in England
