= Vale of Wardour =

Valley in England

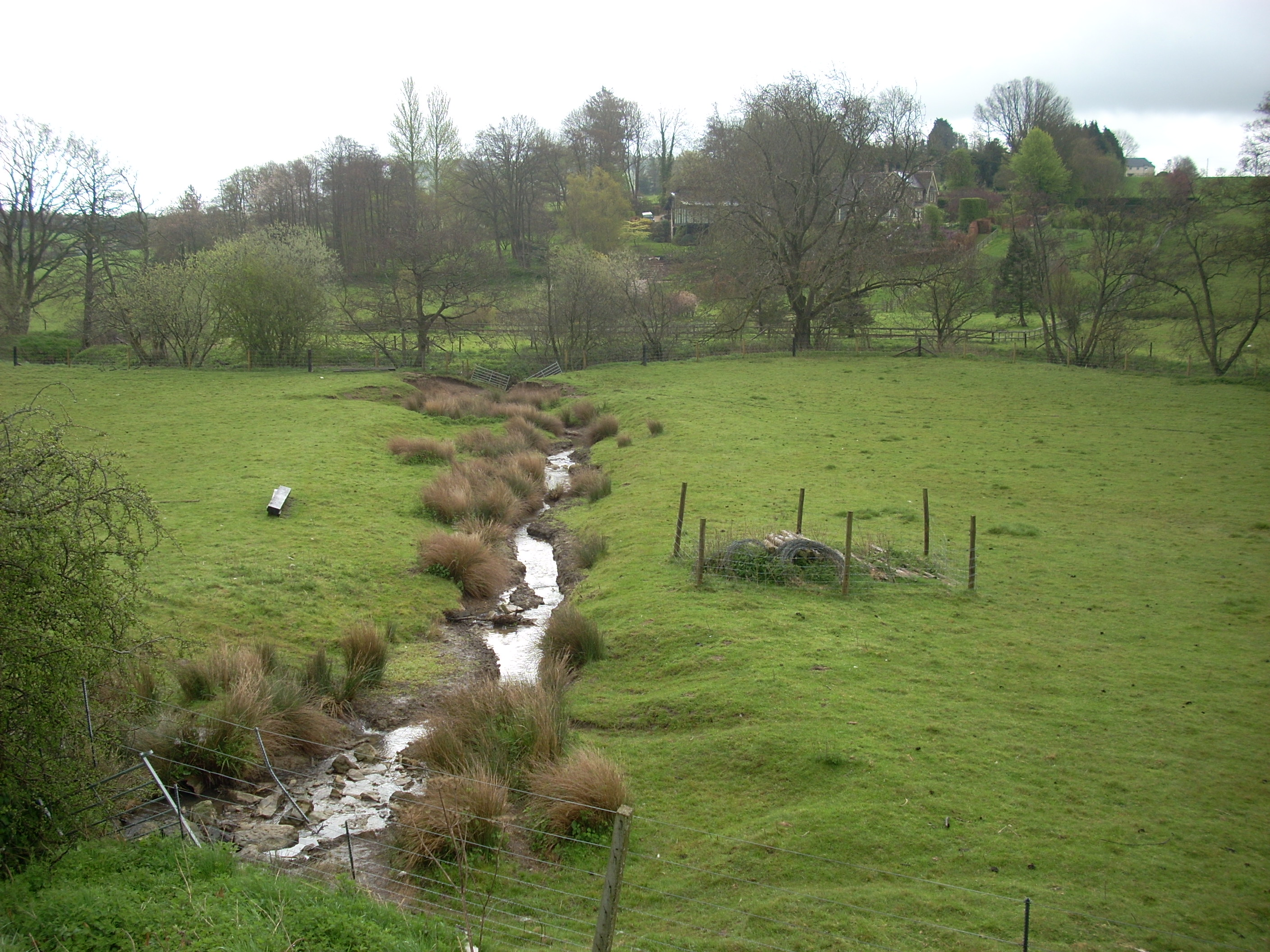
- Stream flowing into the River Nadder near Wardour
- Floor elevation: 121.4 m (398 ft)

Geography
- Coordinates: 51.056°N 2.073°W
- Interactive map of Vale of Wardour

The Vale of Wardour encompasses the valley of the River Nadder in the county of Wiltshire, England.

== Geography ==
=== Topography ===
The Vale of Wardour lies east of the town of Shaftesbury and is a relatively small but varied landscape. Named after the village of Wardour, its main river is the Nadder which flows from west to east through the vale. In the west the Nadder is fed by its main tributary, the Sem; in the east the valley ends around Wilton where the Nadder is joined by the Wylye. The largest village in the vale is Tisbury.

=== Natural region ===
The vale is a western tongue of National Character Area 133: Blackmore Vale and Vale of Wardour, designated by Natural England. To the north is number 132, Salisbury Plain and West Wiltshire Downs, and to the south is number 134, Dorset Downs and Cranborne Chase. The area extends west almost as far as Barford St Martin, where the Nadder valley narrows.

=== Geology ===
Geologically the Vale of Wardour is complex. The Nadder flows through a clay valley surrounded by hills of Purbeck, Portland, and Lower and Upper Greensand.The Gault, thickness up to 27.5 m (90 ft.), is also present in the Vale, notable are the numerous phosphatic nodules it contains.

== Sights ==
- Ancient hillforts: Castle Rings and Castle Ditches
- Fovant Badges
- Old Wardour Castle
- Philipps House
