= Cranborne Chase and West Wiltshire Downs =

Area of Outstanding Natural Beauty in England

Coordinates: 50.96°N 2.04°W

Location of the Cranborne Chase and West Wiltshire Downs AONB in the UK

Cranborne Chase and West Wiltshire Downs, marketed as the Cranborne Chase National Landscape, is an Area of Outstanding Natural Beauty (AONB) covering 379 square miles (980 km^{2}) of Dorset, Hampshire, Somerset and Wiltshire. It is the sixth largest AONB in England.

The area was designated as an AONB in 1981 and confirmed in October 1983. Since 2014, the AONB Partnership of local authorities has used the abbreviated name Cranborne Chase AONB in its promotion of the area. In 2023, AONBs including Cranborne Chase rebranded as National Landscapes.

The AONB includes several distinct landscape areas, among them:

- Cranborne Chase, an area of chalk downland in the south.
- West Wiltshire Downs, an area of chalk downland in the north.
- The Vale of Wardour, a wide clay valley between the two areas of downland.
- The area around Stourhead and Longleat on the Somerset-Wiltshire border, which has a distinctive characteristic of upper greensand hills.

Much of the landscape is farmed chalk downland. The people who populated the area thousands of years ago constructed Ackling Dyke and the Knowlton Circles. The area was later the scene of conflict in the Civil War, seeing the destruction of Old Wardour Castle. Other features include the Larmer Tree Gardens at Tollard Royal; and Fovant, where soldiers training during the First World War cut regimental badges into the chalk hillside.

The AONB includes two large blocks of woodland, Grovely Wood and Great Ridge Wood.
