= Melbury Hill =

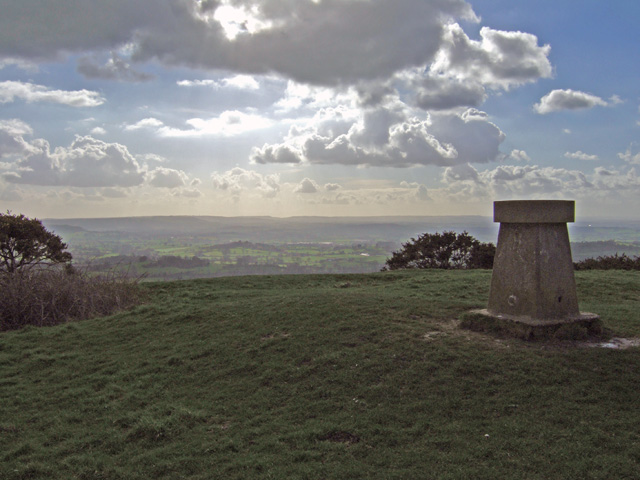
- View from Melbury Hill. To the right is the locator pillar of Melbury Beacon

Highest point
- Elevation: 263 m (863 ft)
- Prominence: 66 m (217 ft)
- Parent peak: Win Green
- Listing: Tump
- Coordinates: 50°58′36″N 2°10′55″W

Geography
- Location: Dorset, England
- Parent range: Cranborne Chase
- OS grid: ST873197
- Topo map: OS Landranger 183, Explorer 118N

Melbury Hill, whose summit is also called Melbury Beacon, is a prominent hill, 263 metres high, on the high chalk escarpment of the North Dorset Downs above the village of Melbury Abbas in the county of Dorset in southern England.

From Melbury Beacon there are superb panoramic views of Blackmore Vale and Cranborne Chase, as well as the Saxon hilltop town of Shaftesbury less than 2 miles to the north.

In 1588 an Armada beacon sited here formed part of a chain of signal beacons from London to Plymouth.

There is a trig point on the summit and a National Trust-owned wood on its western flank above the A350 from Blandford Forum to Shaftesbury.
