= Long Knoll =

Mountain in Wiltshire, England

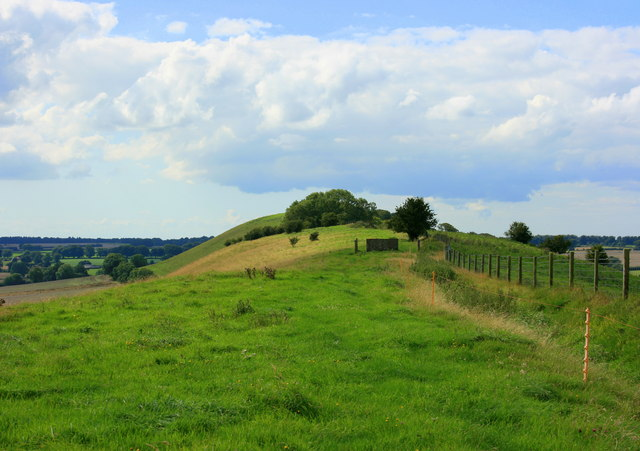
- Long view of Long Knoll

Highest point
- Elevation: 288
- Prominence: 171 m (561 ft)
- Parent peak: Beacon Batch
- Listing: Marilyn

Geography
- Location: Wiltshire, England
- OS grid: ST786376
- Topo map: OS Landranger 183

Long Knoll (grid reference ST794376) is a hill in the West Wiltshire Downs in the west of the English county of Wiltshire. It is a ridge of chalk grassland, some 1.5 kilometres (1 mi) in length, and forms the boundary between the civil parishes of Kilmington to the south and Maiden Bradley to the north. The ridge is 288 metres (945 ft) above sea level at its highest point and it is possible to view King Alfred's Tower, Cranmore Tower, the Black Mountains and Glastonbury Tor on clear days.

The hill is the site of the 34.2-hectare (85-acre) Long Knoll biological Site of Special Scientific Interest, which was notified in 1971, and is part of the Cranborne Chase and West Wiltshire Downs Area of Outstanding Natural Beauty. Long Knoll is the most westerly part of the remains of a chalk plateau. It forms a ridge that runs east and west for about a mile, and is 60 m (200 ft) higher than the surrounding land. The south-facing slope has a mosaic of longer and shorter turfs and has a mixture of grasses, sedges and forbs. Here grow a typical calcareous community including glaucus sedge, sheep's-fescue, meadow oat-grass, heath-grass and common quaking-grass, together with cowslip, salad burnet, rock-rose, betony, small scabious and devil's-bit scabious. Some of the less common chalk grassland herbs include clustered bellflower, early purple orchid, horseshoe vetch, kidney vetch and chalk milkwort.

The north-facing slope, by contrast, has more mosses and bryophytes on the closely grazed turf, with tufted hair-grass, false oat-grass, red fescue and crested hair-grass. Common valerian is an unusual species to find on chalk soils, and other herbs include autumn gentian, fairy flax and an abundance of devil's-bit scabious.

Long Knoll is categorised as a Marilyn, a hill with topographic prominence of at least 150 metres (492 ft).
