= Shaftesbury Town Hall =

Municipal building in Shaftesbury, Dorset, England

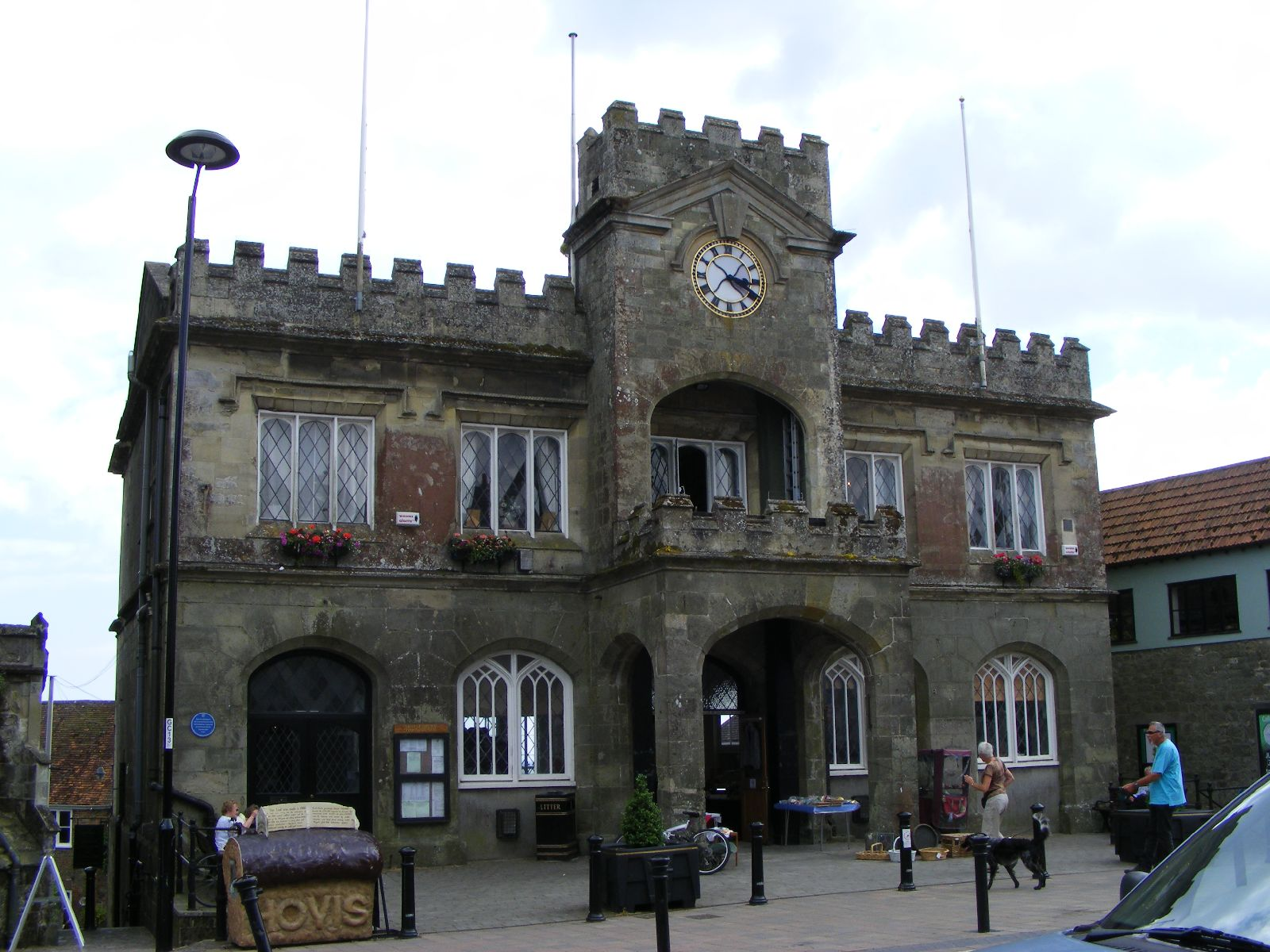
- Shaftesbury Town Hall

- Shown in Dorset
- 51.0056°N 2.1971°W
- Location: High Street, Shaftesbury

History
- Built: 1826–1837

Site notes
- Architectural style: Neoclassical style

Listed Building – Grade II
- Official name: Town Hall
- Designated: 20 June 1952
- Reference no.: 1108741

Shaftesbury Town Hall is a municipal building in the High Street, Shaftesbury, Dorset, England. The town hall, which is the meeting place of Shaftsbury Town Council, is a Grade II listed building.

== History ==
The first town hall was a medieval guildhall; it was itself replaced with a second structure which was financed under the will of a former mayor of the town, Edmund Bower, who had died in 1554. This structure was designed with arcading on the ground floor to allow markets to be held and was erected in the middle of the High Street in 1578. In the early 19th century civic leaders decided, as part of a widening scheme for the High Street, to erect a third town hall on a site to the south of the 16th century structure.

The current building, which was commissioned by Earl Grosvenor, was designed in the Neoclassical style and built between 1826 and 1837. It was constructed in ashlar stone and was castellated. The design involved a symmetrical main frontage with five bays facing onto the High Street; the central bay featured a porch on the ground floor and a casement window on the first floor with a clock tower being added in 1879 (initially built in wood, it was rebuilt in stone in 1925). The clock is by Gillett & Bland and strikes the hours on a single bell. The basement contained a number of police cells which could be accessed from the rear of the building. The principal room in the building was the council chamber on the first floor which was panelled and, on the south side, featured views out over Gold Hill, which has been described as "one of the most romantic sights in England."

The town hall was the headquarters of Shaftesbury Borough Council for much of the 20th century but ceased to be local seat of government when the enlarged North Dorset District Council was formed in 1974. It subsequently became the home of Shaftesbury Town Council.

Four murals were painted by Phyllis Wolff and installed in the town hall in 1979: they depicted the consecration of Shaftesbury Abbey at the instigation of Alfred the Great in 888, the reburial of King Edward the Martyr in the abbey in 979, the visit of Cardinal Otto Candidus, the legate to the Apostolic see of Pope Gregory IX, to confirm the abbey charter in 1240, and, lastly, the dissolution of the abbey under King Henry VIII in 1539. Other works of art in the town hall include a portrait by an unknown artist of Anthony Ashley-Cooper, 3rd Earl of Shaftesbury.
