= Melbury Abbas =

Village and civil parish in Dorset, England

Coordinates: 50.980°N 2.169°W

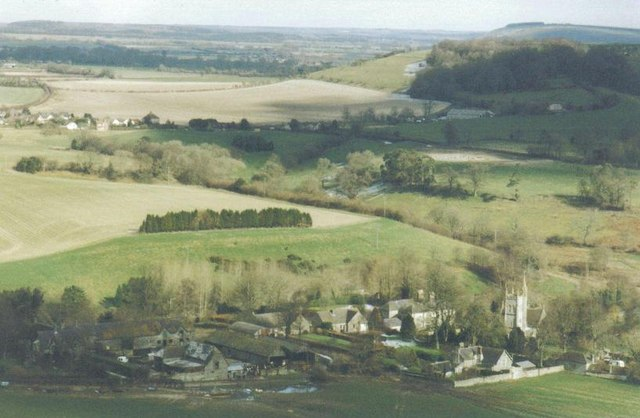
- View looking down on Melbury Abbas from the southwest

- Location within Dorset
- Population: 305
- OS grid reference: ST882200
- Civil parish: Melbury Abbas
- Unitary authority: Dorset
- Ceremonial county: Dorset
- Region: South West
- Country: England
- Sovereign state: United Kingdom
- Post town: SHAFTESBURY
- Postcode district: SP7
- Dialling code: 01747
- Police: Dorset
- Fire: Dorset and Wiltshire
- Ambulance: South Western
- UK Parliament: North Dorset

Melbury Abbas is a village and civil parish in north Dorset, England. It is situated at the edge of the Blackmore Vale under the scarp of Cranborne Chase, 2 miles (3.2 km) south-southwest of the town of Shaftesbury. The parish includes West Melbury and part of Cann Common.

In the 2011 census the parish had 147 dwellings, 134 households and a population of 305.

== History ==
In 1086 Melbury Abbas was recorded in the Domesday Book as Meleberie.

It was in Sixpenny Hundred and had 47 households, 12 ploughlands and 4 mills.

The lord and tenant-in-chief was Shaftesbury Abbey.

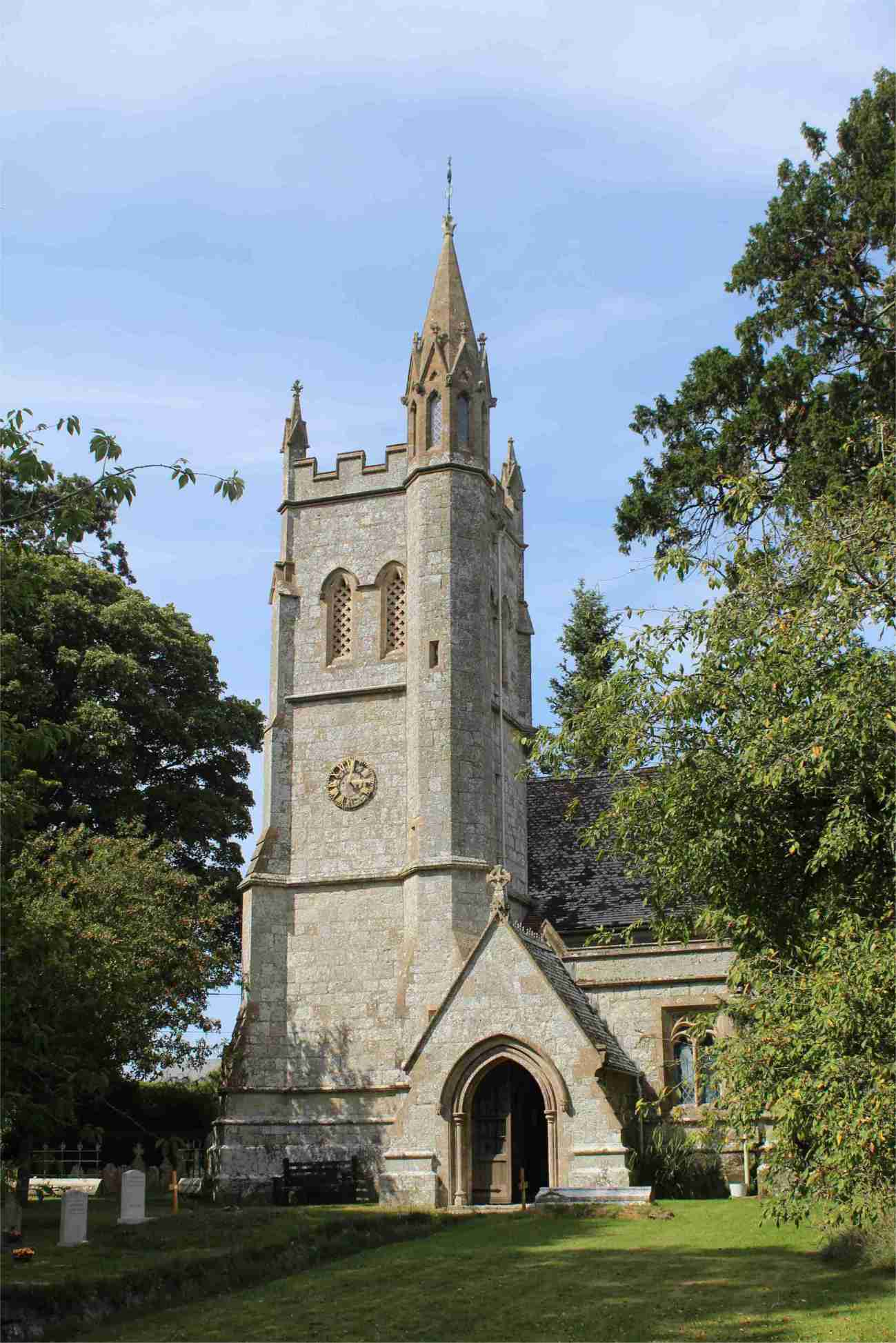
Church of St Thomas

== Church of St Thomas ==
This is on the south side of the village and as well as a square tower at the south west end, has a large spire mounted on the SW corner of the top of the tower.

The original stone church of Norman times had a tower with three bells, at least one transept, and a west door. It survived until 1852 when it was in poor condition and was demolished.

The present church is said to cost Sir Richard Glyn £2500.00. At this time Sir Richard owned most of the village. On 21 December 1852 the Bishop of Salisbury dedicated the new church to St Thomas, whose feast day it was.

== Road Connections ==
Melbury Abbas village is on an unclassified road that follows a hilltop route roughly parallel to the A350 primary route that passes west of the village between Shaftesbury and Blandford. The A350 follows a lower route through villages in the Blackmore Vale. However, much traffic uses the hilltop route as an alternative because it is straighter and passes through fewer villages. Melbury Abbas is the only bottleneck on this road, where it dips down into the valley and becomes narrower.

Dorset County Council have considered bypass schemes, but none has got further than preliminary stages because the village is surrounded by conservation land.
