= Castle Ditches =

Iron Age hillfort in Wiltshire, England

- Spelsbury
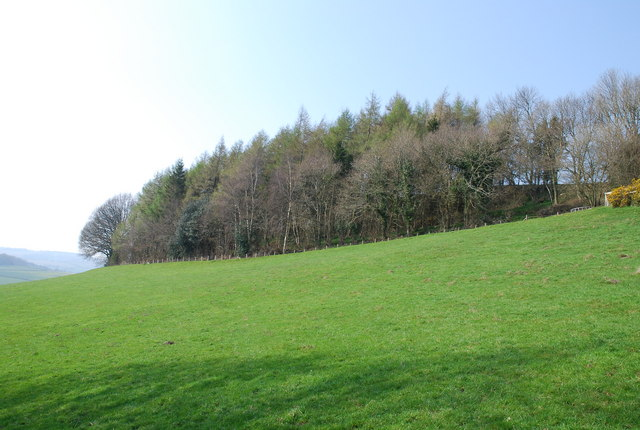
- Woods around Castle Ditches

- Location within Wiltshire
- 51.0540°N 2.0542°W
- Periods: Iron Age
- Location: Wiltshire

Site notes
- Area: 24 acres (9.7 ha)
- Public access: no

Identifiers
- NHLE: 1005701

Scheduled monument

Castle Ditches is the site of an Iron Age trivallate hillfort in the south-east of Tisbury parish in Wiltshire, England.

It is probable that its ancient name was Spelsbury; it was referred to as Willburge in Tisbury's charter of 984 A.D. Its shape is roughly triangular, and follows the contours of the small hill upon which it sits. The earthworks comprise a triple row of ramparts and ditches, now covered on three sides by woodland. There is a large entrance towards the south-east, where there is the shallowest incline of the hill; but there is also a narrow slit on the opposite side. The area within the site encompasses nearly 24 acres (9.7 ha), and the greatest height of the ramparts is about 40 feet (12 m).

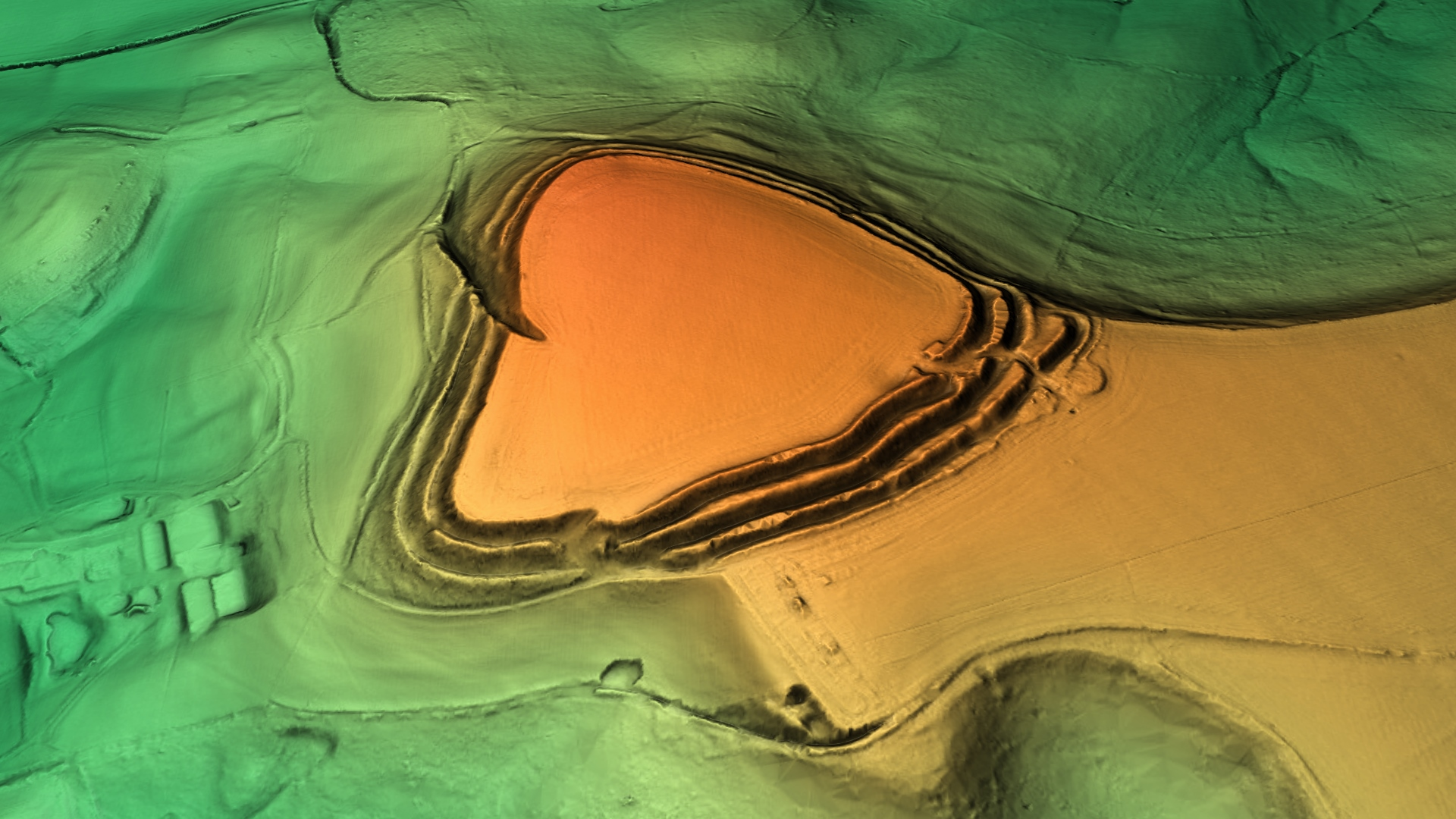
3D view of the digital terrain model

Castle Ditches was recorded as a Scheduled Monument in 1932.

== Location ==
The site is at grid reference ST964282, about 1 1/2 miles (2.4 km) south-east of Tisbury village. The hill has a summit of 193m AOD and overlooks the valley of the River Nadder to the north. Public footpaths surround the site, but the land is privately owned.

== See also ==
- List of hillforts in England
