= Cranborne Chase =

Plateau in southern England

Coordinates: 50.961°N 2.044°W

Ashmore pond

Cranborne Chase (grid reference ST970180) is an area of central southern England, straddling the counties Dorset, Hampshire and Wiltshire. It is part of the Cranborne Chase and West Wiltshire Downs Area of Outstanding Natural Beauty (AONB).

The area is dominated by, and often considered to be synonymous with, a chalk downland plateau. Part of the English Chalk Formation, it is adjacent to Salisbury Plain and the West Wiltshire Downs in the north, and the Dorset Downs to the south west. The highest point is Win Green Down, in Wiltshire, at 910 feet (280 m).

Historically a medieval hunting forest, the area is also noted for its Neolithic and Bronze age archaeology and its rural agricultural character.

== Definitions ==
As an informally defined region, the boundaries of Cranborne Chase vary depending on usage. When defined as the chalk plateau, it is clearly bounded by escarpments which face the valleys of the Blackmore Vale to the west, the Vale of Wardour to the north, and the Hampshire Avon to the east. To the south the chalk gently slopes, giving way more subtly to the Dorset Heaths landscape around Verwood and Wimborne Minster.

The name is derived from its historic use as a medieval hunting forest, which at its height covered an area bounded by Salisbury, Shaftesbury, Blandford Forum, Wimborne Minster and Ringwood, incorporating a slightly larger area than just the chalk plateau. Early written records of this definition include a jury verdict at New Sarum in 1246 and the Quo Warranto of Edward I, issued in or around 1280. Over time this estate shrank, and the term has also been used to describe a smaller remnant area of around 10 miles (16 km) by 4 miles (6.4 km) immediately to the west of Cranborne village.

A more recent usage of the term, used since 2014 by the Cranborne Chase and West Wiltshire Downs AONB Partnership of local authorities, has been to promote the much larger AONB area simply as "Cranborne Chase AONB". This usage includes a large area outside of the more established landscape and historical definitions of Cranborne Chase, including the West Wiltshire Downs and an area of greensand landscape on the Somerset-Wiltshire border around Longleat and Stourhead.

== History and archaeology ==
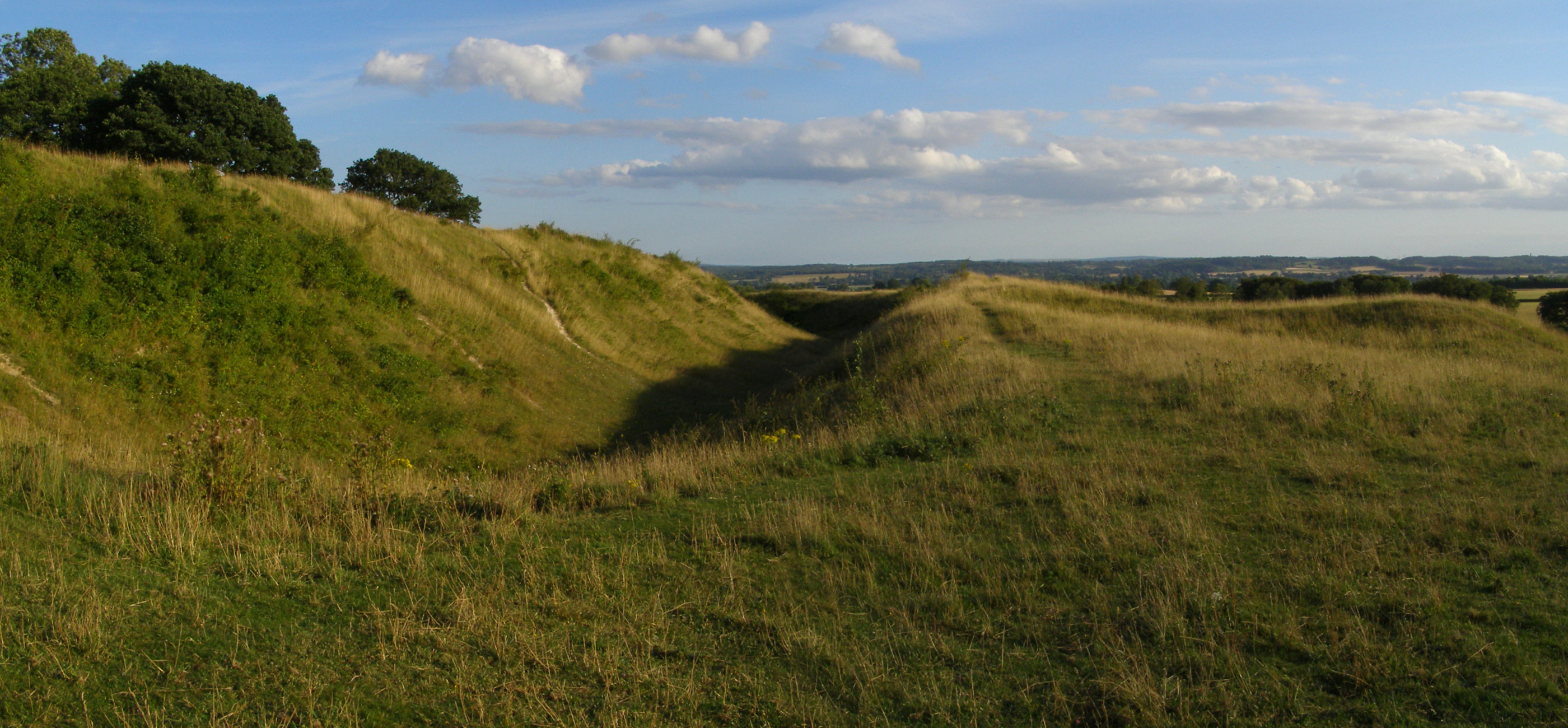
Badbury Rings hill fort

The downland has a long history with many earthworks and archaeology from the Neolithic age onwards. The dense woodland originally covering the downs would have gradually been cleared by the first farmers, but would have grown back repeatedly over the centuries as soils became exhausted and the agricultural carrying capacity of the land was exceeded several times over the course of six millennia. Much of the area therefore remained wooded from the Middle Ages until World War II.

Analysis of remains found in some of the Bronze Age burial mounds, by experts at Bournemouth University, has revealed that many of the bones had small holes drilled in then, enabling them, it is hypothesised, to have been articulated by means of wooden pegs, i.e. the skeletons were prevented from falling apart during repeated removal and re-burial.

There are many Neolithic and Bronze Age monuments, including the henge monuments at Knowlton and the remains of a number of Iron Age settlements on the downs, most notably the hill fort at Badbury Rings (Vindocladia). There is a Roman villa which has been dug by archaeological television programme Time Team. During the Saxon invasion of England the Romano-British kept the invaders out of Dorset by building Bokerley Dyke, a defensive ditch, across the Roman road that runs across the downs from Dorchester to Old Sarum.

The downs have been sparsely populated since Saxon times, largely preserving archaeology until World War II when the need for agricultural land outweighed the archaeological importance. It was here that Augustus Pitt Rivers developed modern archaeological field work in the 19th century.

The downs are named after the village Cranborne, founded by the Saxons, which had a manor house and a small monastery. The word "chase" comes from the hunts, frequented by royalty (including Kings John, Henry VIII and James I), which took place on the downs.

The first known owner of the chase is thought to have been Brictric. His possessions were confiscated by Queen Matilda, wife of William the Conqueror; on her death, it passed to the Crown, and was granted, with other lands forming the feudal barony of Gloucester, to Robert Fitzhamon in 1083. This passed to his son-in-law Robert, 1st Earl of Gloucester. Ownership of the chase passed through successive Earls of Gloucester until the death of Gilbert de Clare, 8th Earl of Gloucester in 1314. The chase passed to his sister Elizabeth de Clare (d. 1360), and thence to her granddaughter Elizabeth de Burgh, 4th Countess of Ulster (d. 1363). The Countess was succeeded by her daughter Philippa, 5th Countess of Ulster (d. 1382), wife of Edmund Mortimer, 3rd Earl of March. The chase was owned by successive Earls of March until 1461, when the last Earl was crowned as Edward IV of England. Cranborne Chase remained crown property until 1616, when it was granted to Robert Cecil, 1st Earl of Salisbury. His great-grandson, the 3rd Earl, sold it to Anthony Ashley Cooper, 1st Earl of Shaftesbury in 1671. His son, the 2nd Earl, sold it in 1692 to Thomas Freke (d. 1701), who bequeathed it to Elizabeth Freke (the wife of his kinsman, also Thomas Freke) and her father Thomas Pile, with reversion to George Pitt should she die without children. Pitt inherited Cranborne Chase from her in 1714, and it passed from father to son in the Pitt family to his great-grandson George Pitt, 2nd Baron Rivers, after whose death it was disfranchised.

Much of the Chase is still owned by large estates such as Kingston Lacy.

Cranborne Chase School, a former boarding school for girls, was based at two locations in Cranborne Chase: at Crichel House near the village of Moor Crichel in Dorset from 1946 to 1961, and then at New Wardour Castle in the settlement of Wardour (near the village of Tisbury) in Wiltshire, until the School's closure in 1990.

== Geography ==
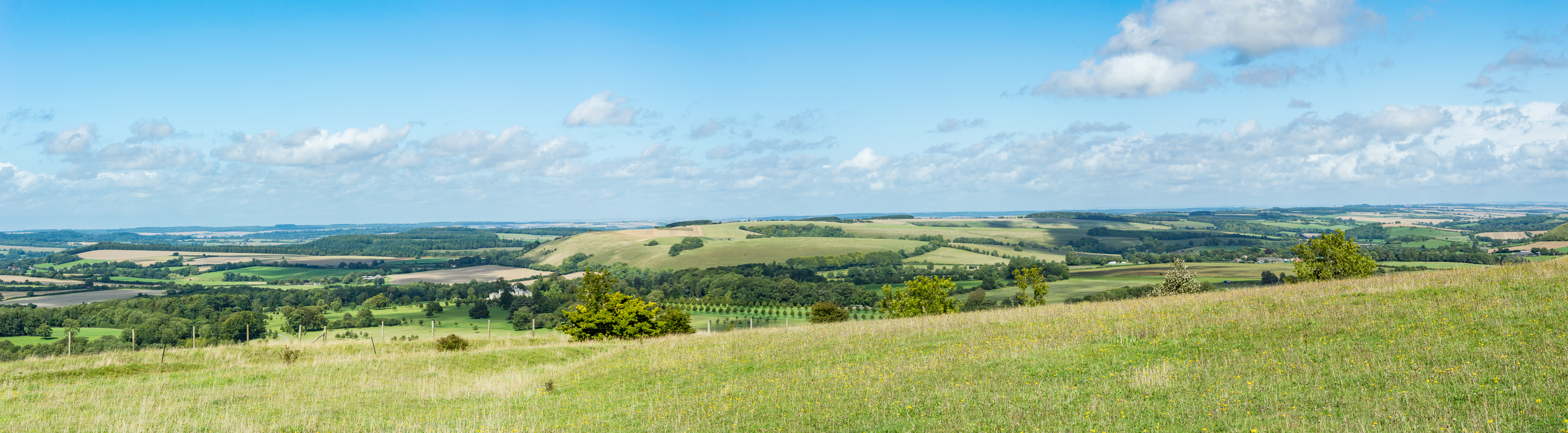
Panorama at Win Green showing the northern chalk escarpment above the Vale of Wardour.

=== Natural region ===
Cranborne Chase is part of a National Character Area (No. 134), "Dorset Downs and Cranborne Chase", designated by Natural England.

=== Hills ===
The landscape of Cranborne Chase is remarkably varied, its most dramatic scenery being near the boundary between Dorset and Wiltshire where the chalk downland rises sharply to the rounded summits of Breeze Hill (262 m), with the hairpin bends of the B3081 climbing Zig Zag Hill on its northwestern flanks, and Win Green (277 m). Nearby, another prominent top, Melbury Hill (263 m) above Melbury Abbas, "appears almost like an island rising above the flat, sea-like expanses of" Compton Abbas airfield.

Further south are two more summits on an outlier of the Chase that define its southern limits: Hambledon and Hod Hills.

== Biodiversity ==
An area of 1,115 acres (451 ha) of Cranborne Chase has been notified as a biological Site of Special Scientific Interest, notification initially taking place in 1975.

As some of the wooded areas in the chase are centuries old, they possess a diverse ground flora that is associated with such sites. The area is one of the richest in southern England for numbers of lichen species; over 160 have been recorded.

== See also ==
- Bowerchalke – geological profile of a Lower Greensand inlier on chalklands of Cranborne Chase
