= Win Green Down =

Hill in Wiltshire

Win Green
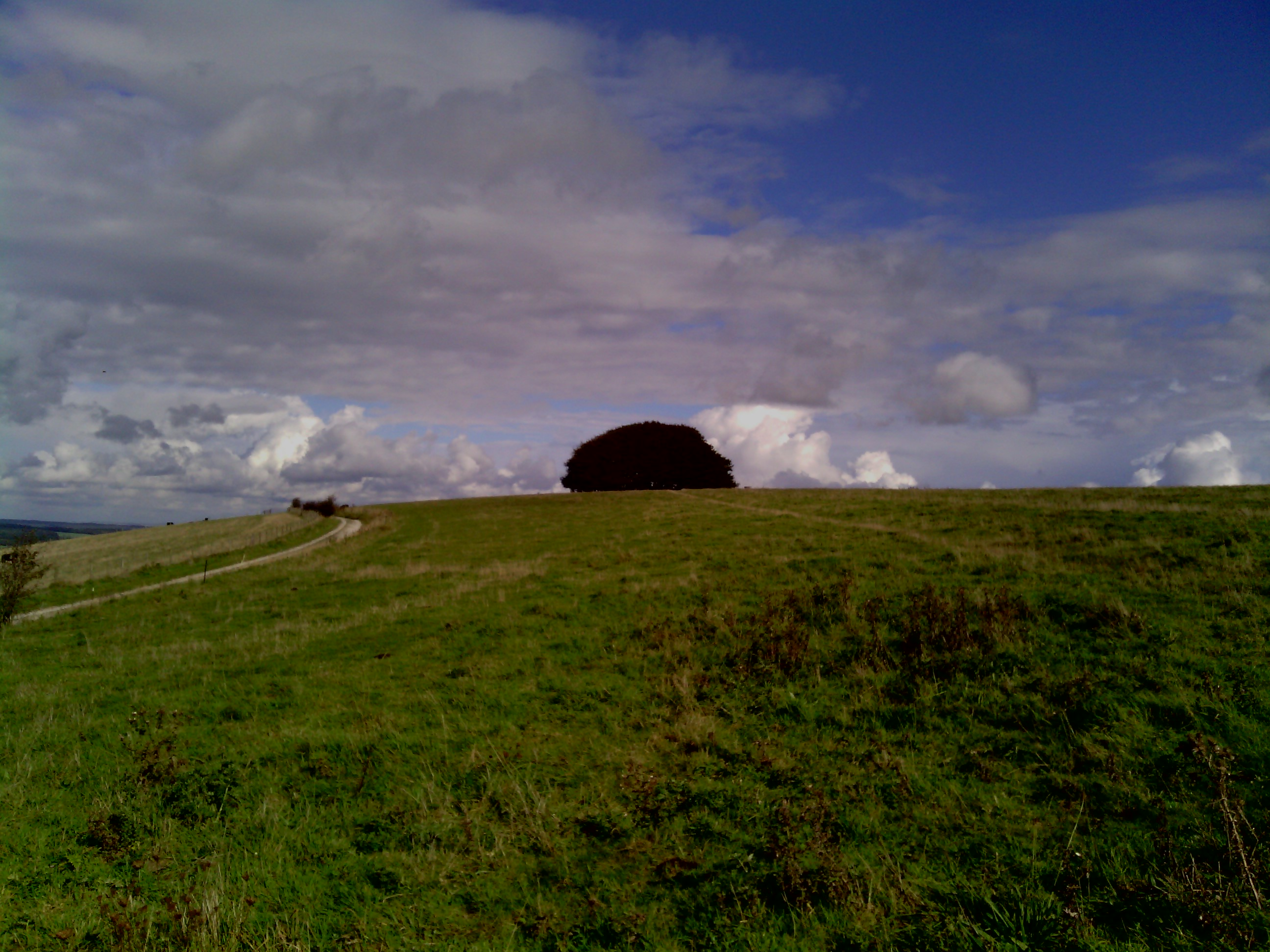
- Wingreen Hill, the highest point of Cranborne Chase

Highest point
- Elevation: 277 m (909 ft)
- Parent peak: Long Knoll
- Coordinates: 50°59′08″N 2°06′29″W

Geography
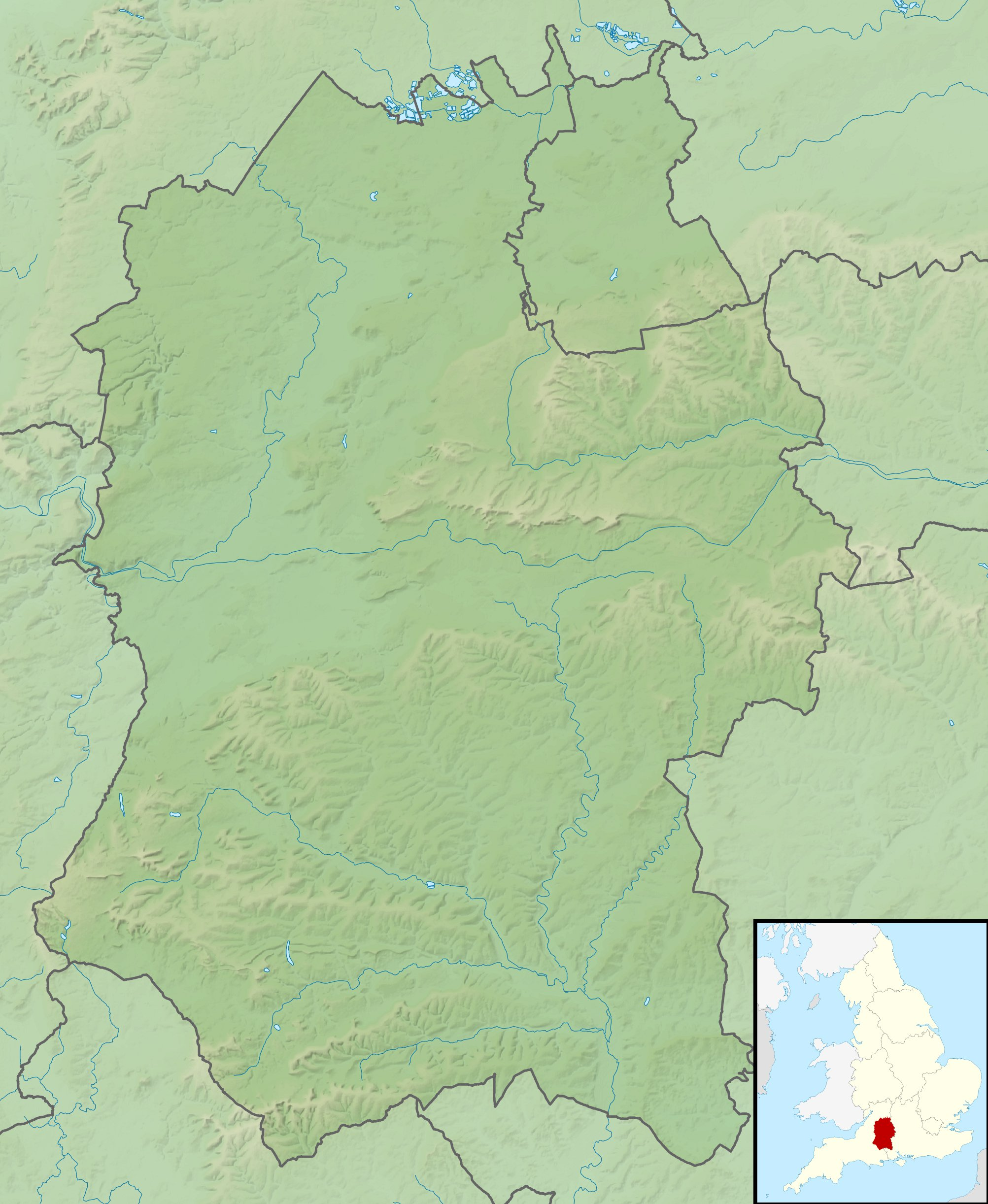
- Location within Wiltshire
- Location: Wiltshire, England
- Parent range: North Wessex Downs
- OS grid: ST927209
- Topo map: OS Landranger 184

Win Green Down at grid reference ST927209 in south-western Wiltshire, England is a 26.0 hectares (64 acres) biological Site of Special Scientific Interest, notified in 1971.

Its summit, Win Green, is at grid reference ST924205 and is the highest point of Cranborne Chase at 277 metres (909 ft). There are extensive views, with Bournemouth, the Isle of Wight, Salisbury, Glastonbury Tor, the Mendips, the Quantocks and Milk Hill all visible in clear conditions. It is classed as a Marilyn, and is a landmark due to the clump of trees on the high point. The parent peak is Long Knoll.
