= West Wiltshire Downs =

Hills in Wiltshire, England

Coordinates: 51.110°N 2.034°W

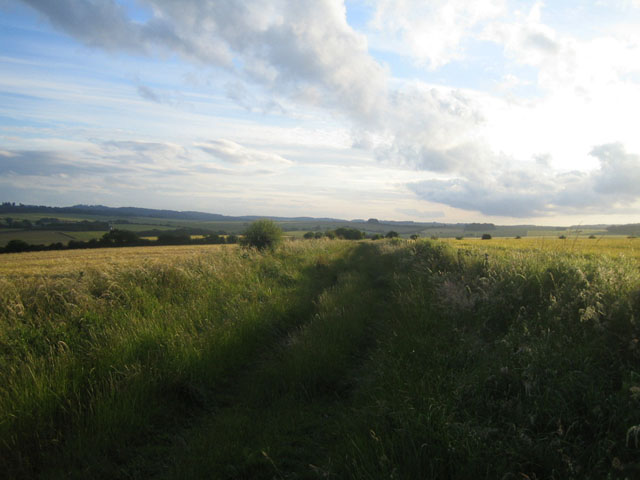
Ox Drove along chalk downland in west Wiltshire. In the distance are the hills of the West Wiltshire Downs near Fonthill.

The West Wiltshire Downs is an area of downland in the west of the county of Wiltshire, England. Its highest point is Long Knoll at 288 metres.

The West Wiltshire Downs are geologically the same unit as Salisbury Plain to the north and Cranborne Chase to the south.

The West Wiltshire Downs are split between two of the National Character Areas designated by Natural England: No. 134, Dorset Downs and Cranborne Chase; and No. 132, Salisbury Plain and West Wiltshire Downs.
