= Wiltshire =

County of England

- Ceremonial county
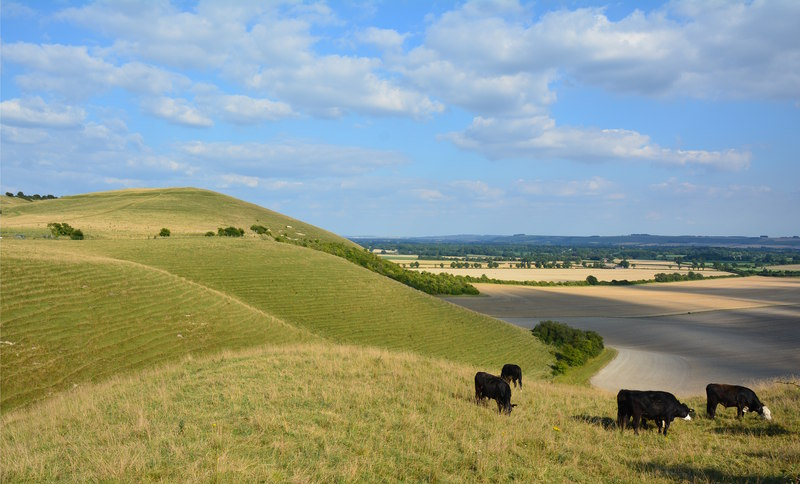
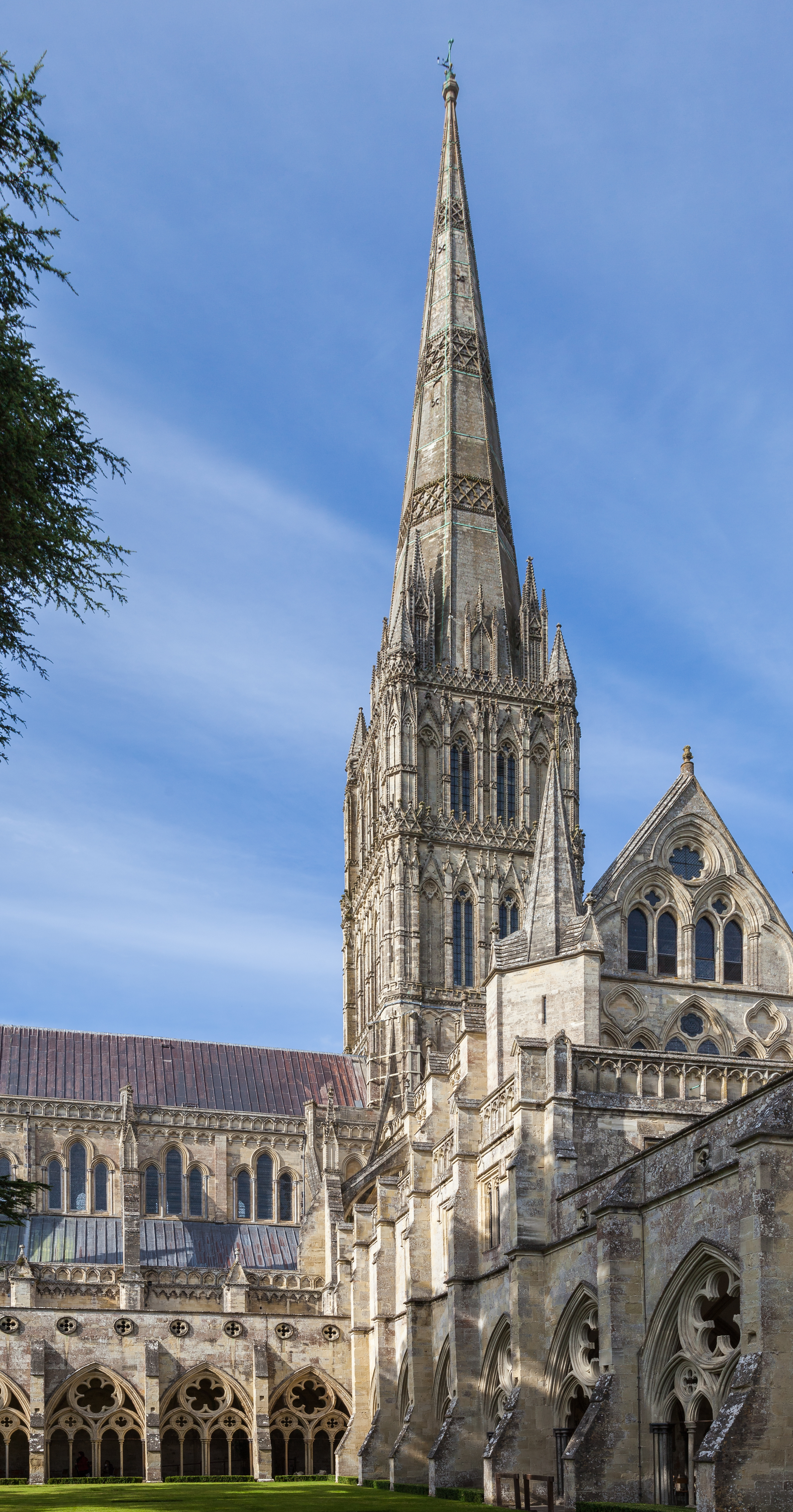
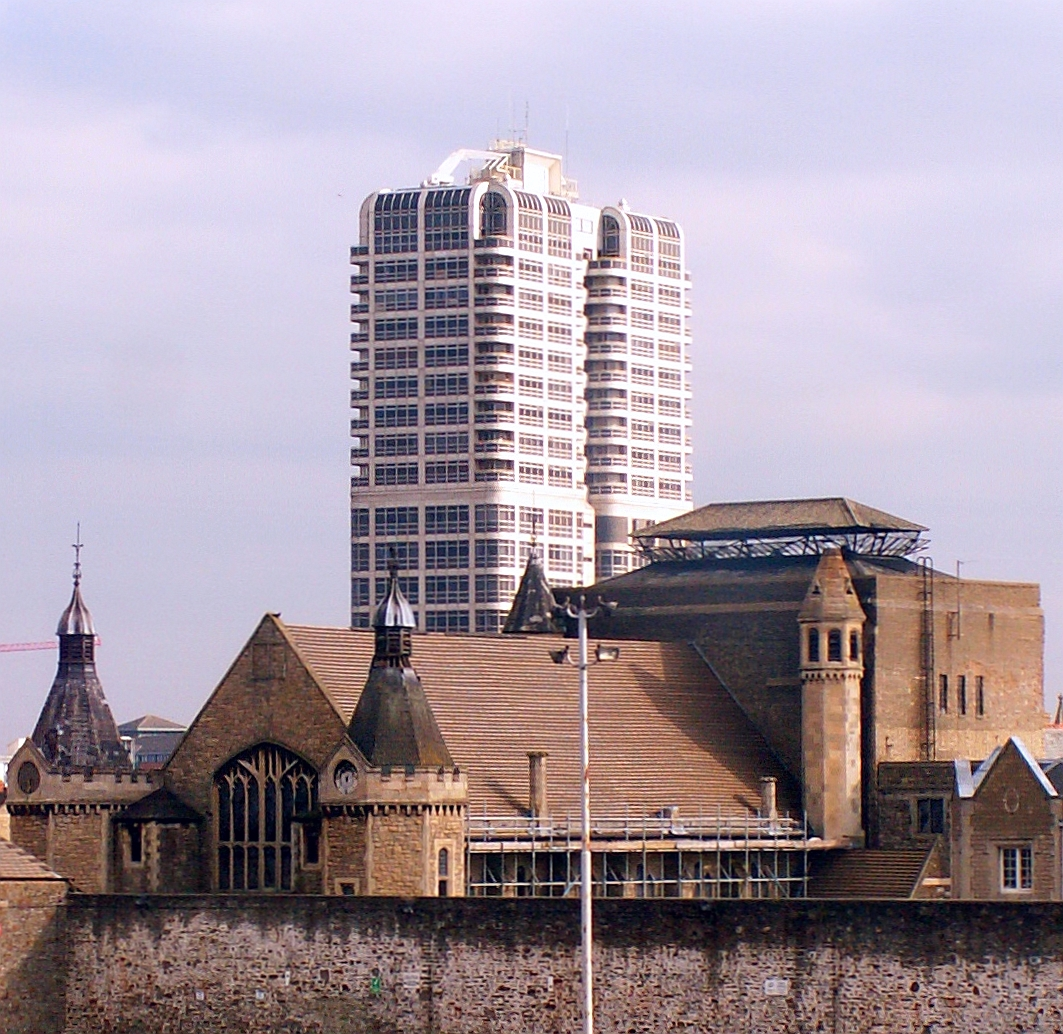
- Marlborough Downs, Salisbury Cathedral, and a view of Swindon

- Wiltshire within England
- Coordinates: 51.3°N 01.9°W
- Sovereign state: United Kingdom
- Constituent country: England
- Region: South West
- Established: Ancient
- Time zone: UTC+0 (GMT)
  - Summer (DST): UTC+1 (BST)
- UK Parliament: List of MPs
- Police: Wiltshire Police
- Ceremonial county
- Lord Lieutenant: Sarah Troughton
- High Sheriff: Alexander Paul Lamy Goodwin
- Area: 3,485 km^{2} (1,346 sq mi)
  - Rank: 14th of 48
- Population (2024): 767,575
  - Rank: 34th of 48
  - Density: 220/km^{2} (570/sq mi)
- Unitary authorities
- Councils: Wiltshire Council; Swindon Borough Council
- Districts
- Districts of Wiltshire; Unitary
- Districts: 1. Wiltshire; 2. Swindon

Wiltshire (/ˈwɪlt.ʃər, -ʃɪr/; abbreviated to Wilts) is a ceremonial county in South West England. It borders Gloucestershire to the north, Oxfordshire to the north-east, Berkshire to the east, Hampshire to the south-east, Dorset to the south, and Somerset to the west. The largest settlement is Swindon.

The county has an area of 3,485 km^{2} (1,346 sq mi) and had an estimated population of 767,575 in 2024. The county is mostly rural, and the centre and south-west are sparsely populated. Swindon is in the north-east of the county, and its other major settlements include the city of Salisbury in the south-east and the towns of Trowbridge and Chippenham in the west. For local government purposes, the county comprises two unitary authority areas, Swindon and Wiltshire.

The north-west of Wiltshire is part of the limestone Cotswolds, and the remainder of the county is characterised by chalk downlands. The Marlborough Downs lie in the north-east of the county and encompass Savernake Forest. To their south is the Vale of Pewsey, south of which, in the centre of the county, is Salisbury Plain. The south-west contains the West Wiltshire Downs, to the south of which is the Vale of Wardour, and the far south comprises part of Cranborne Chase. The south-east contains part of the New Forest. The county's two major rivers are both called the Avon. The northern Avon enters the county in the north-west and flows south-westward before exiting near Bradford on Avon, its vale separating the Cotswolds from the rest of the county. The southern Avon rises on Salisbury Plain and flows south through Salisbury, then into Hampshire. Much of the county is protected: the Marlborough Downs, West Wiltshire Downs, Vale of Wardour, Cranborne Chase, and the Cotswolds are each part of national landscapes, and the New Forest is a national park.

Salisbury Plain is noted for the Stonehenge and Avebury stone circles, which together form a UNESCO World Heritage Site, as well as other ancient landmarks. Much of the plain is a training area for the British Army. Salisbury is notable for its medieval cathedral. Large country houses open to the public include Longleat, which also features a safari park, and the National Trust's Stourhead.

== Toponymy ==
The county, in the 9th century written as Wiltunscir, is named after the former county town of Wilton.

== History ==
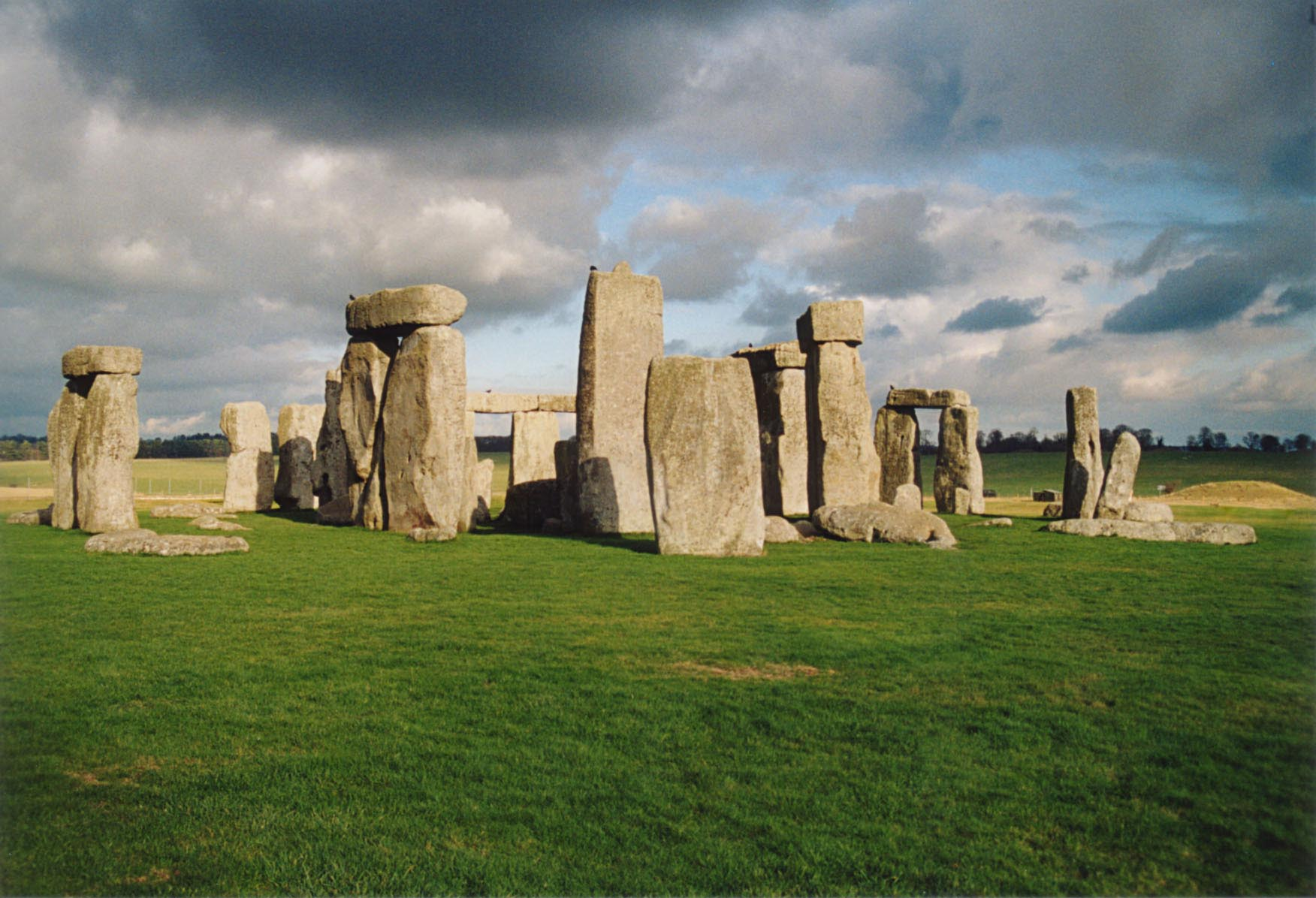
Stonehenge

Wiltshire is notable for its pre-Roman archaeology. The Mesolithic, Neolithic and Bronze Age people who occupied southern Britain built settlements on the hills and downland that cover Wiltshire. Stonehenge and Avebury are perhaps the most famous Neolithic sites in the UK.

In the 6th and 7th centuries, Wiltshire was at the western edge of Saxon Britain, as Cranborne Chase and the Somerset Levels prevented the advance to the west. The Battle of Bedwyn was fought in 675 between Escuin, a West Saxon nobleman who had seized the throne of Queen Saxburga, and King Wulfhere of Mercia. In 878 the Danes invaded the county. Following the Norman Conquest in 1066, large areas of the country came into the possession of the crown and the church.

At the time of the Domesday Survey, the industry of Wiltshire was largely agricultural; 390 mills are mentioned, and vineyards at Tollard and Lacock. In the succeeding centuries, sheep-farming was vigorously pursued, and the Cistercian monastery of Stanley exported wool to the Florentine and Flemish markets in the 13th and 14th centuries.

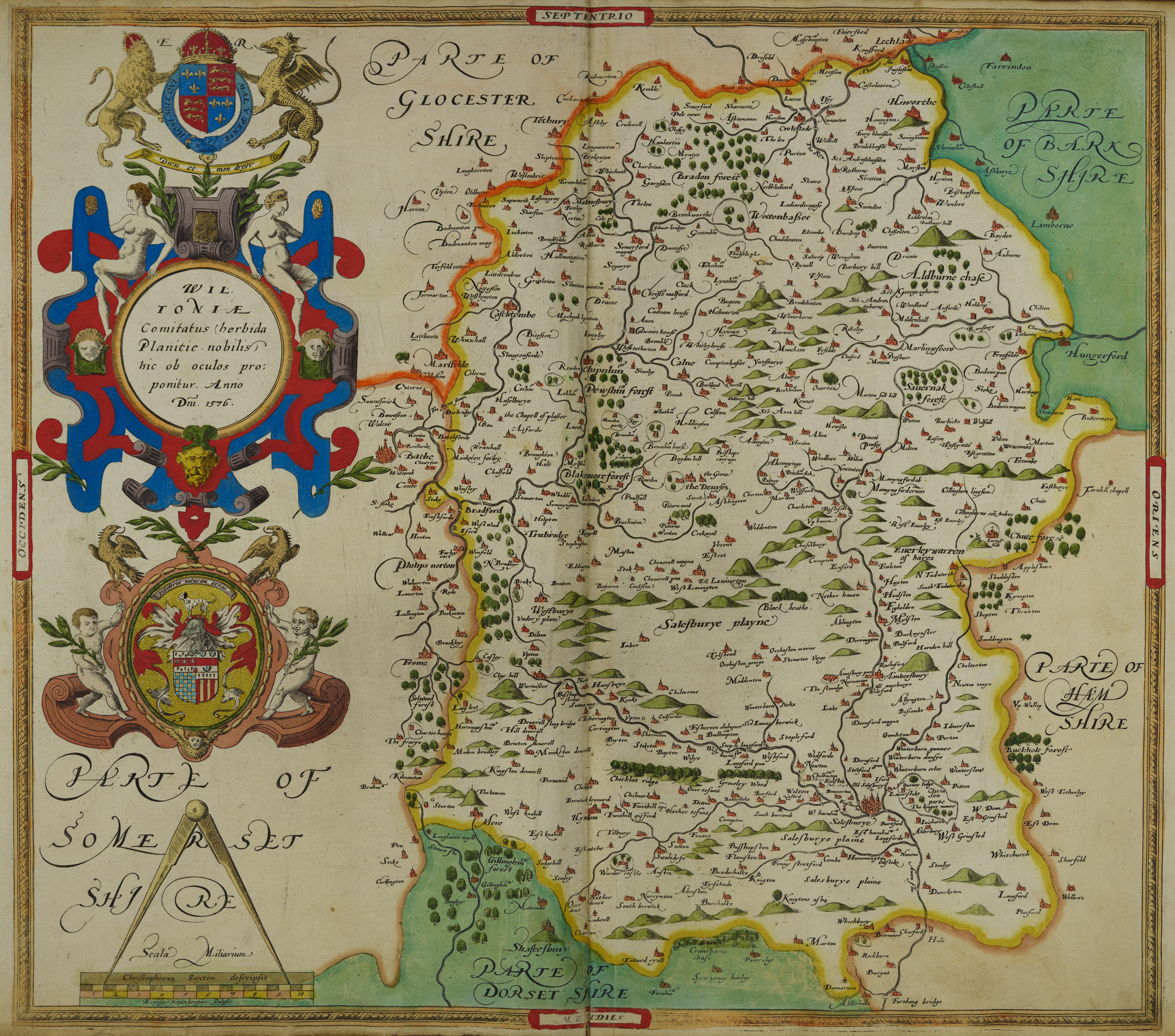
Hand-drawn map of Wiltshire, 1576, by Christopher Saxton

In the 17th century, during the English Civil War, Wiltshire was largely Parliamentarian. The Battle of Roundway Down, a Royalist victory, was fought near Devizes.

In 1794, it was decided at a meeting at the Bear Inn in Devizes to raise a body of ten independent troops of Yeomanry for the county of Wiltshire, which formed the basis for what would become the Royal Wiltshire Yeomanry, who served with distinction both at home and abroad, during the Boer War, World War I and World War II. The Royal Wiltshire Yeomanry lives on as Y (RWY) Squadron, based in Swindon, and B (RWY) Squadron, based in Salisbury, of the Royal Wessex Yeomanry.

Around 1800, the Kennet and Avon Canal was built through Wiltshire, providing a route for transporting cargoes from Bristol to London until the development of the Great Western Railway.

Information on the 261 civil parishes of Wiltshire is available at Wiltshire Council's Wiltshire Community History website, which has maps, demographic data, historic and modern pictures, and short histories.

The local nickname for Wiltshire natives is 'Moonrakers'. This originated from a story of smugglers who managed to foil the local excisemen by hiding their alcohol, possibly French brandy in barrels or kegs, in a village pond. When confronted by the excisemen, they raked the surface to conceal the submerged contraband with ripples and claimed that they were trying to rake in a large round cheese visible in the pond—really a reflection of the full moon. The officials took them for simple yokels or madmen and left them alone, allowing them to continue with their illegal activities. Many villages claim the tale for their own village pond, but the story is most commonly linked with The Crammer in Devizes.

== Geography ==
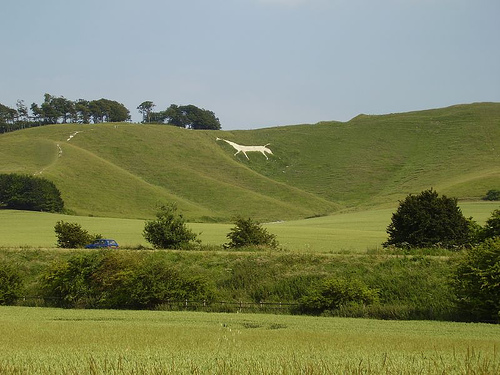
Cherhill White Horse, east of Calne

Two-thirds of Wiltshire, a mostly rural county, lies on chalk, a kind of soft, white, porous limestone that is resistant to erosion, giving it a high chalk downland landscape. This chalk is part of a system of chalk downlands throughout eastern and southern England formed by the rocks of the Chalk Group and stretching from the Dorset Downs in the west to Dover in the east. The largest area of chalk in Wiltshire is Salisbury Plain, which is used mainly for arable agriculture and by the British Army as training ranges. The highest point in the county is the Tan Hill–Milk Hill ridge in the Pewsey Vale, just to the north of Salisbury Plain, at 295 m (968 ft) above sea level.

The chalk uplands run north-east into West Berkshire in the Marlborough Downs ridge, and south-west into Dorset as Cranborne Chase. Cranborne Chase, which straddles the border, has, like Salisbury Plain, yielded much Stone Age and Bronze Age archaeology. The Marlborough Downs are part of the North Wessex Downs AONB (Area of Outstanding Natural Beauty), a 1,730 km^{2} (670-square-mile) conservation area.

In the north-west of the county, on the border with Gloucestershire and Somerset, the underlying rock is the resistant oolite limestone of the Cotswolds. Part of the Cotswolds AONB is also in Wiltshire, in the county's north-western corner.

Between the areas of chalk and limestone downland are clay valleys and vales. The largest of these vales is the Avon Vale. The Avon cuts diagonally through the north of the county, flowing through Bradford on Avon and into Bath and Bristol. The Vale of Pewsey has been cut through the chalk into Greensand and Oxford Clay in the centre of the county. In the south west of the county is the Vale of Wardour. The south-east of the county lies on the sandy soils of the northernmost area of the New Forest.

Chalk is a porous rock, so the chalk hills have little surface water, and the main settlements in the county were therefore established at wet points. Notably, Salisbury lies between the chalk of Salisbury Plain and the marshy flood plains.

Part of the Avon Green Belt reaches the outskirts of Rudloe, Corsham, and Trowbridge, preventing urban sprawl—particularly between Bradford on Avon and Trowbridge—while protecting surrounding settlements from the eastward expansion of Bath, Somerset.

=== Climate ===
Along with the rest of South West England, Wiltshire has a temperate climate that is generally wetter and milder than that of counties further east. The annual mean temperature is approximately 10 °C (50.0 °F). Although there is a marked maritime influence, it is generally less pronounced than in other south-western counties, which are closer to the sea. July and August are the warmest months with mean daily maxima of approximately 22 °C (71.6 °F). In winter, mean minimum temperatures of 1 °C (33.8 °F) or 2 °C (35.6 °F) are usual, and air frost is frequent. In the summer, the Azores high-pressure system affects south-west England; however, convective clouds sometimes form inland, reducing the number of hours of sunshine. Annual sunshine rates are slightly lower than the regional average of 1,600 hours.

In December 1998, there were 20 days without sun recorded at Yeovilton (Somerset). Most of the rainfall in the south-west is caused by Atlantic depressions or by convection, though a proportion is caused orographically (uplift over hills). Autumn and winter are the rainiest seasons, driven by Atlantic depressions, which are then most active. Even so, any month can be the wettest or driest in a given year, but the wettest is much more likely to occur between October and March, and the driest between April and September. In summer, a greater proportion of the rainfall is caused by the sun heating the ground, leading to convection, showers, and thunderstorms. It is often the northern half of the county that sees most of the showers with south-westerly winds in summer, whereas in the south of the county, the proximity of a relatively cold English Channel often inhibits showers. In autumn and winter, however, the sea is often relatively warm compared with the air passing over it, which can lead to higher rainfall in the south of the county (e.g., Salisbury recorded over 200mm of rain in November 2009 and January 2014). Average rainfall for the county is around 800 mm (31 in), with drier parts averaging 700mm (28in) and the wettest 900mm (around 35in). About 8–15 days of snowfall are typical. November to March have the highest mean wind speeds, and June to August have the lightest winds. The predominant wind direction is from the south-west.

== Demographics ==
=== Ethnicity ===
In the 2021 census, the ethnic composition of the ceremonial county of Wiltshire comprised: 90.3% White, 5.1% Asian, 1.6% Black, 2.0% Mixed, and 0.9% Other.

- White (90.3%): English, Welsh, Scottish, Northern Irish or British (85.1%), Irish (0.6%), Gypsy or Irish Traveller (0.1%), Roma (0.1%), Other White (4.4%)
- Asian (5.1%): Indian (2.7%), Pakistani (0.3%), Bangladeshi (0.3%), Chinese (0.4%), Other Asian (1.4%)
- Black (1.6%): African (1.0%), Caribbean (0.4%), Other Black (0.3%)
- Mixed (2.0%): White and Asian (0.6%), White and Black African (0.3%), White and Black Caribbean (0.6%), Other Mixed or Multiple ethnic groups (0.6%)
- Other (0.9%): Arab (0.1%), Any other ethnic group (0.8%)

Note: Sub-group totals may not sum exactly to the group total due to rounding. Data for the ceremonial county are aggregated from its constituent unitary authorities.

Ethnic groups in Wiltshire (ceremonial county)
Ethnic group	2001 census	2011 census	2021 census				
Ethnic group	2001 census	2011 census	2021 census	White	97.6%	94.5%	90.3%
Asian (Note: The 2001 census figures for 'Asian' and 'Other' have been adjusted to reflect the 2011 reclassification of the Chinese ethnic group from 'Other' to 'Asian' to allow comparison across census years.)	1.1%	2.9%	5.1%				
Black	0.4%	0.9%	1.6%				
Mixed	0.8%	1.4%	2.0%				
Other	0.2%	0.3%	0.9%				

=== Religion ===
Religion in Wiltshire (ceremonial county) (2021 United Kingdom census)
1. Christian (49.0%)
2. No religion (41.0%)
3. Muslim (1.30%)
4. Hindu (1.10%)
5. Buddhist (0.60%)
6. Sikh (0.30%)
7. Jewish (0.10%)
8. Other religion (0.60%)
9. Not stated (5.90%)

In the 2021 census, the religious composition of the ceremonial county of Wiltshire comprised: 49.0% Christian, 41.0% No religion, 1.3% Muslim, 1.1% Hindu, 0.6% Buddhist, 0.3% Sikh, 0.1% Jewish, 0.6% Other religion, and 5.9% Not stated.

Religion in Wiltshire (ceremonial county)
Religion	2001 census	2011 census	2021 census				
Religion	2001 census	2011 census	2021 census	Christian	74.7%	62.0%	49.0%
No religion	16.2%	27.9%	41.0%				
Muslim	0.5%	0.8%	1.3%				
Hindu	0.2%	0.6%	1.1%				
Buddhist	0.2%	0.4%	0.6%				
Sikh	0.2%	0.2%	0.3%				
Jewish	0.1%	0.1%	0.1%				
Other religion	0.3%	0.5%	0.6%				
Not stated	7.5%	7.4%	5.9%				

== Governance ==
=== Unitary authorities ===
The Coat of Arms of Wiltshire County Council

The ceremonial county of Wiltshire consists of two unitary authority areas, Wiltshire and Swindon, governed respectively by Wiltshire Council and Swindon Borough Council.

Until the 2009 structural changes to local government, Wiltshire (apart from Swindon) was a two-level county, divided into four local government districts – Kennet, North Wiltshire, Salisbury and West Wiltshire – which existed alongside Wiltshire County Council, covering the same area and carrying out more strategic tasks, such as education and county roads. On 1 April 2009, these five local authorities were merged into a single unitary authority called Wiltshire Council. With the abolition of the District of Salisbury, a new Salisbury City Council was created at the same time to carry out several citywide functions and to hold the city's charter.

Since the 2025 Wiltshire Council election, the council has operated under no overall control, governed by a Liberal Democrat and independent administration (2025–present). This follows continuous Conservative majorities and administrations since the unitary authority was first established in 2009.

Since the 2026 Swindon Borough Council election, the council has operated under no overall control, governed by a Conservative administration (2026–present). This follows a Labour majority and administration from 2023 to 2026.

=== Westminster Parliamentary ===
Wiltshire is represented by eight Parliamentary constituencies. Seven are entirely within the county, while the South Cotswolds constituency extends into southern parts of Gloucestershire.

At the 2024 general election, the Conservatives won three seats (East Wiltshire, Salisbury, and South West Wiltshire); Labour two (Swindon North and Swindon South); and the Liberal Democrats three (Chippenham, Melksham and Devizes, and South Cotswolds).

=== 2016 United Kingdom European Union membership referendum ===
In the 2016 United Kingdom European Union membership referendum, the electorate of the ceremonial county of Wiltshire voted in favour of Brexit, with 53.1% supporting withdrawal from the European Union and 46.9% opposing withdrawal from the European Union.

2016 United Kingdom European Union membership referendum results in Wiltshire
Choice	Wiltshire (ceremonial county)		Wiltshire (unitary authority)		Swindon (unitary authority)	
Choice	Votes	%	Votes	%	Votes	%
Leave	213,382	53.1%	151,637	52.5%	61,745	54.7%
Remain	188,478	46.9%	137,258	47.5%	51,220	45.3%

== Economy ==
This is a chart of the trend of regional gross value added (GVA) of Wiltshire at current basic prices with figures in millions of British pounds sterling.

Year	Regional gross value added	Agriculture	Industry	Services
1995	4,354	217	1,393	2,743
2000	5,362	148	1,566	3,647
2003	6,463	164	1,548	4,751

The Wiltshire economy benefits from the "M4 corridor effect", which attracts business, and the attractiveness of its countryside, towns, and villages. The northern part of the county is richer than the southern part, particularly since Swindon is home to national and international corporations such as Intel, Motorola, Patheon, Catalent (formerly known as Cardinal Health), Becton-Dickinson, WHSmith, Early Learning Centre and Nationwide, with Dyson located in nearby Malmesbury. Wiltshire's employment structure is distinctive in having a significantly higher number of people in various forms of manufacturing (especially electrical equipment and apparatus, food products, beverages, furniture, rubber, pharmaceuticals, and plastic goods) than the national average.

In addition, there is higher-than-average employment in public administration and defence, due to the military establishments around the county, particularly around Amesbury and MoD Corsham. There are sizeable British Army barracks at Tidworth Camp, Bulford Camp and Warminster, and the Royal School of Artillery is at Larkhill. Further north, RAF Lyneham was home to the RAF's C-130 Hercules fleet until 2011; the MoD Lyneham site is now a centre for Army technical training. Wiltshire is also distinctive for the high proportion of its working-age population who are economically active (86.6% in 1999–2000) and its low unemployment rates. The gross domestic product (GDP) level in Wiltshire did not reach the UK average in 1998, and was only marginally above the rate for South West England.

== Education ==
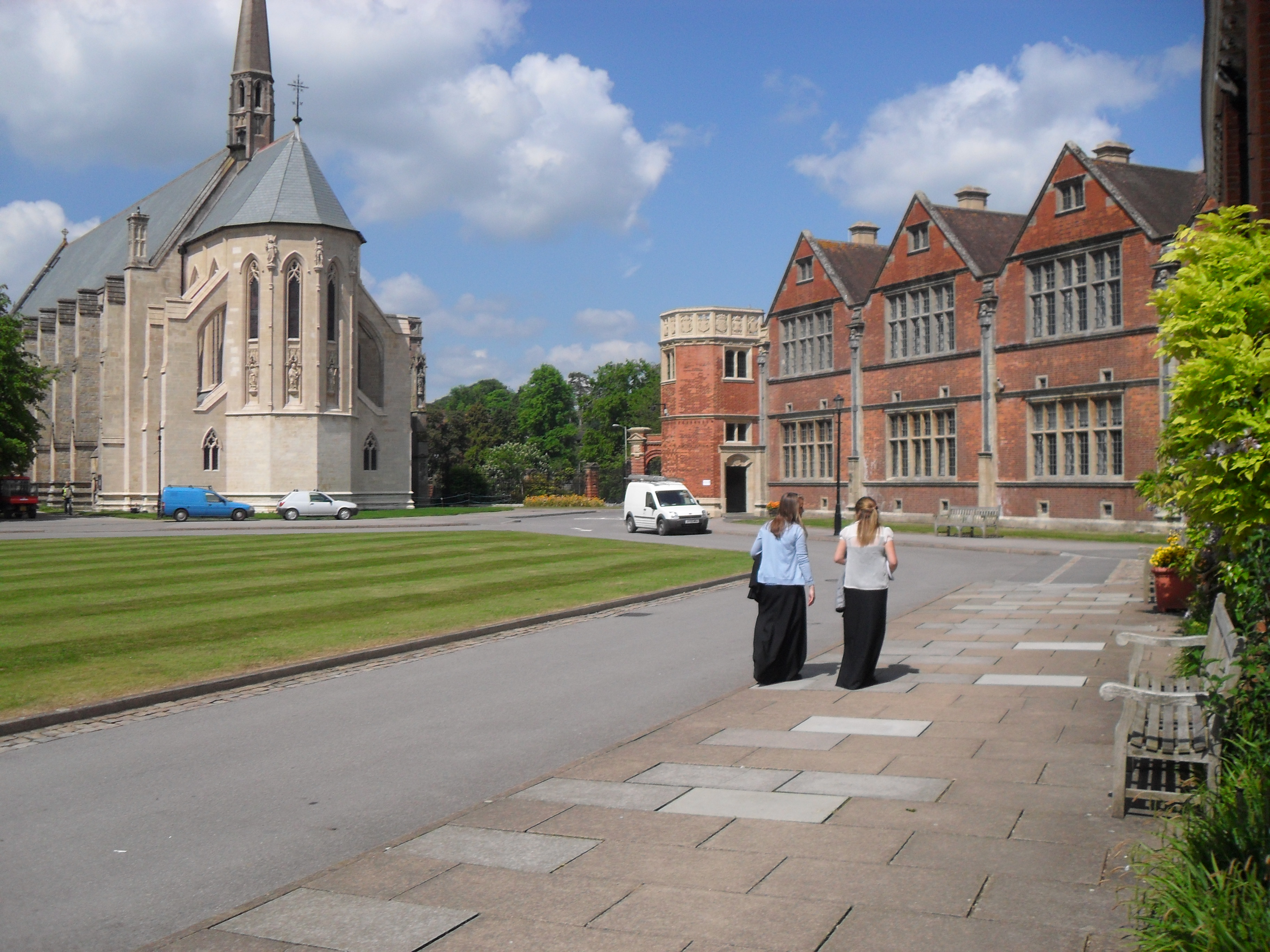
Marlborough College: court and chapel

Wiltshire has 30 county secondary schools, publicly funded, of which the largest is Warminster Kingdown, and eleven private secondaries, including Marlborough College, St Mary's Calne, Dauntsey's near Devizes, and Warminster School. The county schools are nearly all comprehensives, with the older pattern of education surviving only in Salisbury, which has two grammar schools (South Wilts Grammar School and Bishop Wordsworth's School) and three non-selective schools.

There are four further education colleges, which also provide some higher education: New College (Swindon); Wiltshire College (Chippenham, Trowbridge and Salisbury); Salisbury Sixth Form College; and Swindon College. Wiltshire is also home to a University Technical College, UTC Swindon, specialising in engineering. A second UTC, South Wiltshire UTC, was based in Salisbury but closed in August 2020.

Wiltshire is one of the few remaining English counties without a university or university college (though Wiltshire College does incorporate a University Centre); the closest university to the county town of Trowbridge is the University of Bath. However, Bath Spa University has a centre at Corsham Court in Corsham, and Oxford Brookes University maintains a minor campus in Swindon (almost 50 km from Oxford). Swindon is the UK's second largest centre of population (after Milton Keynes) without its own university.

Service Children's Education has its headquarters in Trenchard Lines in Upavon, Wiltshire.

== Sport ==
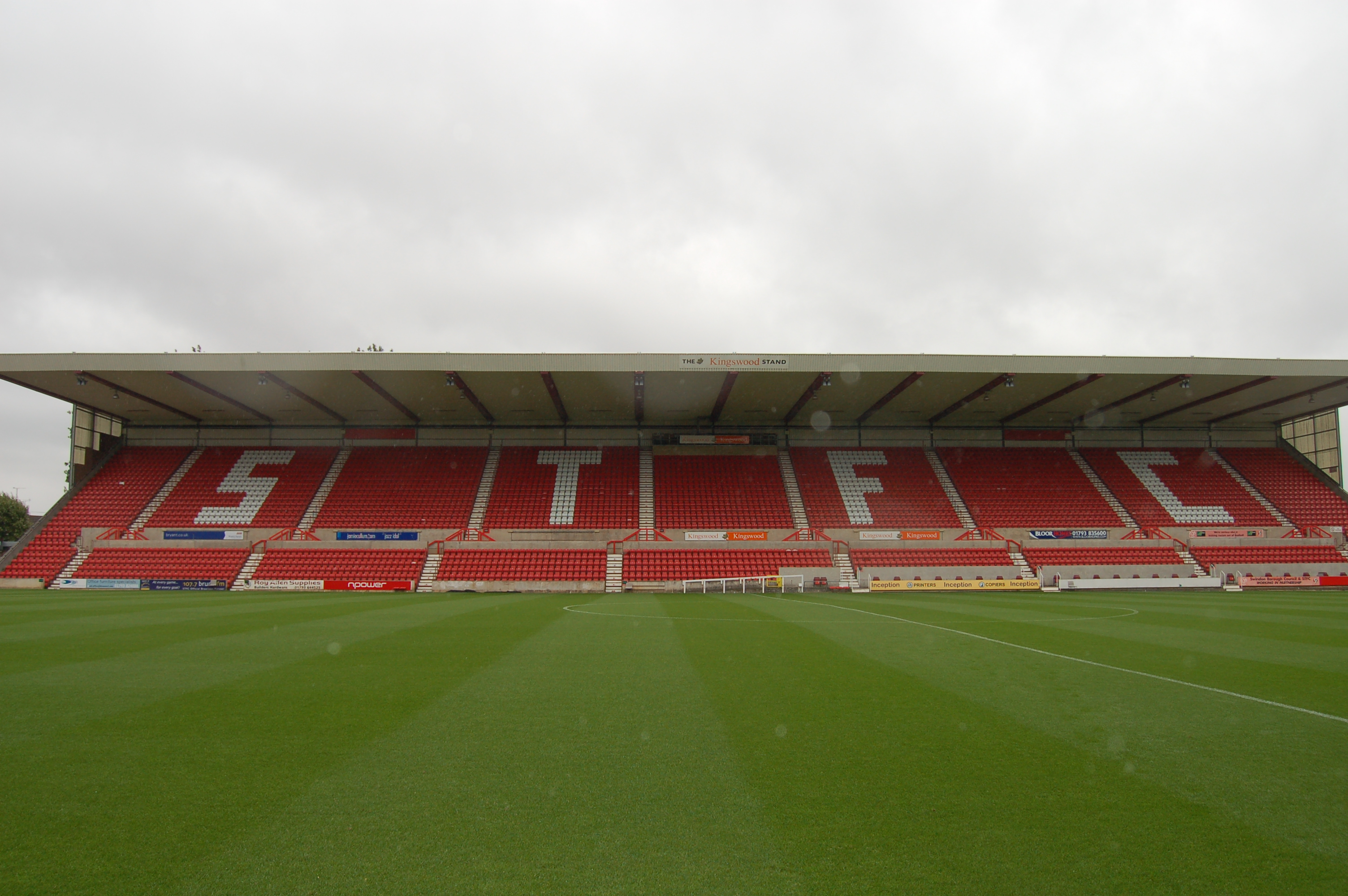
The County Ground, Swindon is the home of Swindon Town, the only football league club in Wiltshire.

The county is represented in the Football League by Swindon Town, who play at the County Ground stadium near Swindon town centre. They joined the Football League on the creation of the Third Division in 1920, and have remained in the league ever since. Their most notable achievements include winning the Football League Cup in 1969 and the Anglo-Italian Cup in 1970, two successive promotions in 1986 and 1987 (taking them from the Fourth Division to the Second), promotion to the Premier League as Division One play-off winners in 1993 (as inaugural members), the Division Two title in 1996, and their promotion to League One in 2007 after finishing third in League Two.

Salisbury are the area's highest-ranked non-league football club; they currently play in the Southern Premier League. After Salisbury City went into liquidation in 2014, a new club, Salisbury, was formed in 2015.

Wiltshire County Cricket Club play in the Minor Counties league.

Swindon Robins Speedway team, who competed in the top national division, the SGB Premiership, had been at their track at the Blunsdon Abbey Stadium near Swindon since 1949. In 2020, they stopped racing due to the COVID-19 pandemic and subsequently announced in 2022 that they would not be returning. Swindon Wildcats compete in the English Premier Ice Hockey League, the second tier of British ice hockey, and play their home games at Swindon's Link Centre.

== Flags ==
The flag designed to represent Wiltshire

Without consultation with the populace, Wiltshire Council formally adopted the ‘Bustard Flag’ as the flag for the area it governs on 1 December 2009 — not for the ceremonial county of Wiltshire; consequently, the flag does not represent the Borough of Swindon.

The flag features eight wavy stripes, which also alternate between green and white, symbolising Wiltshire's pasture-lands and chalk downs. These stripes were derived from the horizontal stripes on the escutcheon of the now obsolete Coat of Arms of Wiltshire County Council, as the council was abolished on 1 April 2009 and replaced with the unitary authority, Wiltshire Council. The coat of arms was officially granted on 5 April 1937. A silhouette of a male great bustard (Otis tarda), representing the bird reintroduced to Wiltshire, is centred on a green central disk, representing Wiltshire's open grassland. The silhouette is larger than the disk, overlapping with the disk's rim and the flag's stripes. Although registered as gold, the actual colour of the great bustard silhouette is alpine. The rim of the disk is divided into six alternating green and white sections, representing both the county's historic stone circles, such as Stonehenge and Avebury, and the six surrounding ceremonial counties: Berkshire, Dorset, Gloucestershire, Hampshire, Oxfordshire, and Somerset. The disk's rim sections are enclosed by a thin outer green line and a thin inner white line. The flag's dimensions follow a 3:5 proportion.

The great bustard had been extinct in England since 1832, but the Wiltshire-based charity, the Great Bustard Group (GBG), imported chicks from Russia between 2004 and 2012, and then eggs from Spain between 2014 and 2019, releasing the birds onto Salisbury Plain. In the autumn of 2024, there were around 70 great bustards in south Wiltshire.

The Bustard Flag has faced criticism from vexillologists and heraldists for its irregular design and intricate details. The silhouette is too large to be contained by the disk, and along with the thin inner and outer border lines on the disk's rim, is not discernible from a distance. The stripes' wavy nature becomes indistinguishable from horizontal stripes when the flag is flying.

== Notable settlements ==
Wiltshire has twenty-one towns and one city:

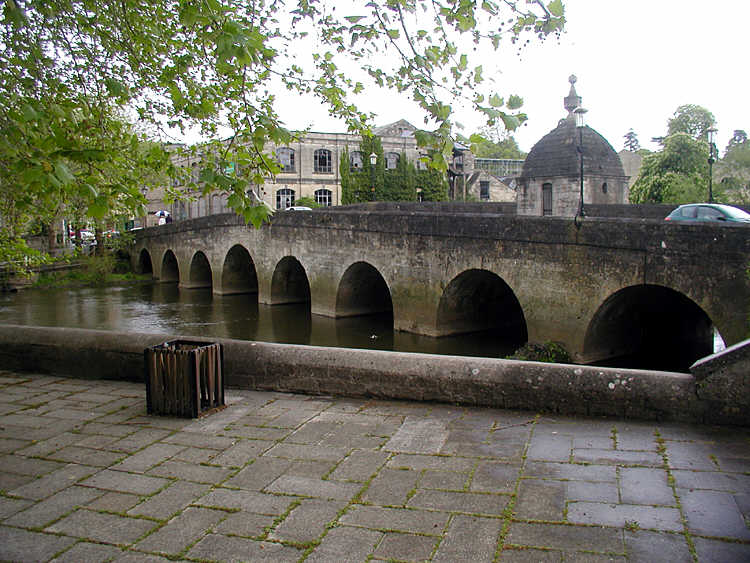
A bridge over the River Avon at Bradford on Avon

- Amesbury
- Bradford on Avon
- Calne
- Chippenham
- Corsham
- Cricklade
- Devizes
- Highworth (Borough of Swindon)
- Larkhill
- Ludgershall
- Malmesbury
- Marlborough
- Melksham
- Mere
- Royal Wootton Bassett
- Salisbury (city)
- Swindon (Borough of Swindon)
- Tidworth
- Trowbridge
- Warminster
- Westbury
- Wilton

A list of settlements is at List of places in Wiltshire.

== Media ==
Local TV coverage is covered by BBC West and ITV West Country; however, Swindon and Salisbury receive BBC South and ITV Meridian.

The county's local radio stations are BBC Radio Wiltshire, Heart West, Greatest Hits Radio South West and Greatest Hits Radio Salisbury (covering Salisbury and surrounding areas).

County-wide local newspapers are the Gazette and Herald and Wiltshire Times.

== Places of interest ==
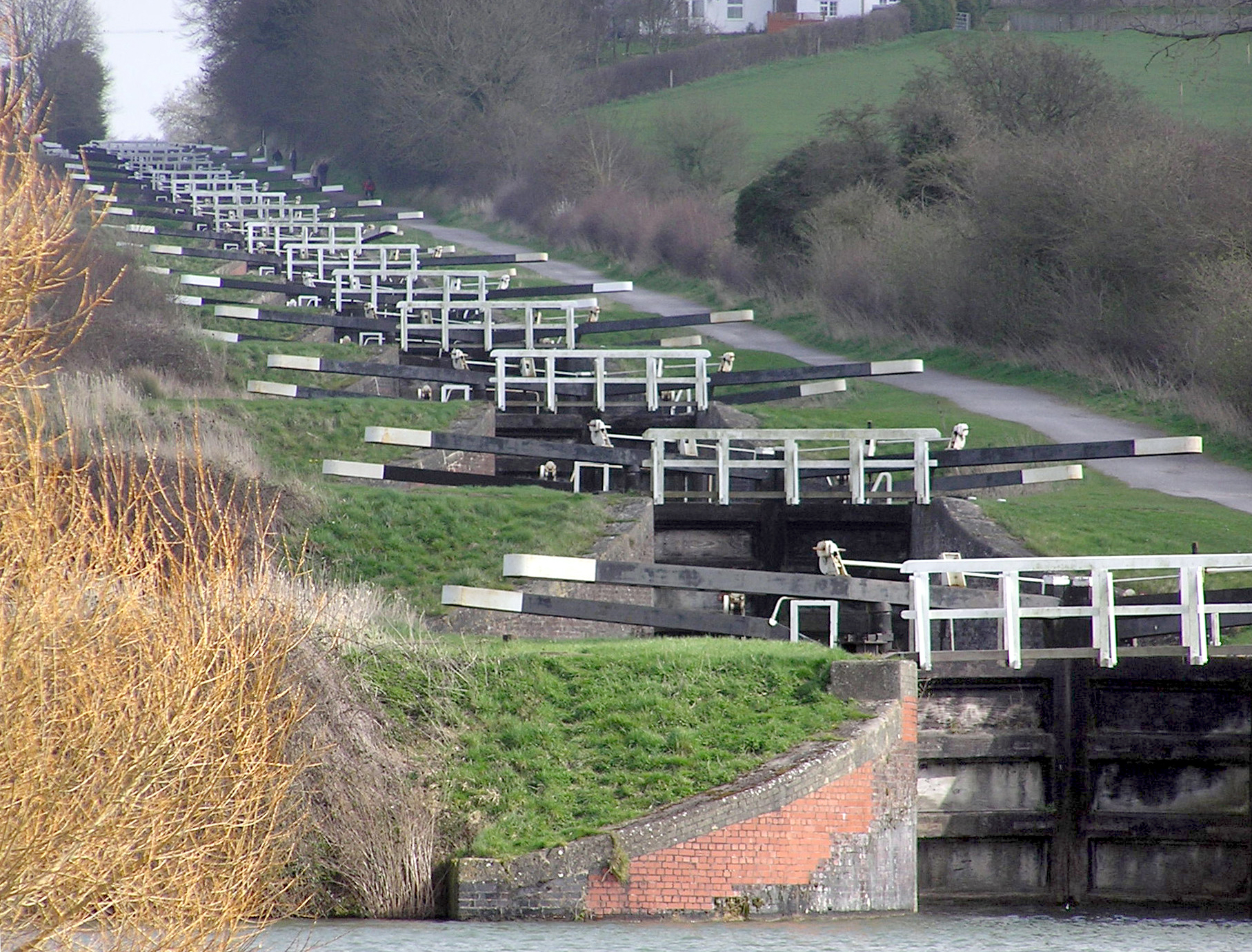
The flight of 16 locks at Caen Hill on the Kennet and Avon Canal

Key
	Abbey/Priory/Cathedral
Accessible open space	Accessible open space
	Amusement/Theme Park
	Castle
Country Park	Country Park
	English Heritage
	Forestry Commission
Heritage railway	Heritage railway
Historic house	Historic House
Places of Worship	Places of Worship
Museum (free) Museum	Museum (free/not free)
National Trust	National Trust
	Theatre
	Zoo

Places of interest in Wiltshire include:

- Arc Theatre, at the Trowbridge campus of Wiltshire College
- Ashcombe House
- Avebury, Neolithic stone circle
- Avebury Manor and Garden
- Avon Valley Path
- Barbury Castle
- Bentley Wood
- Bowood House
- Caen Hill Locks, Devizes
- Castle Combe village
- Castle Hill, Mere
- Central Government War Headquarters, Corsham, underground nuclear bunker with accommodation for 4000
- Cherhill White Horse
- Chisbury Chapel
- Coate Water, East Swindon
- Corsham Court
- Cotswold Water Park
- The Courts Garden, Holt
- Crofton Pumping Station
- Edington Priory
- Fonthill Abbey
- Great Chalfield Manor
- Iford Manor and gardens
- Kennet and Avon Canal Museum, Devizes
- Kennet Avenue, Avebury
- King Alfred's Tower, Stourhead
- Lacock Abbey
- Lacock village, largely owned by the National Trust
- Littlecote House
- Longleat Safari Park
- Ludgershall Castle
- Lydiard Park & House, West Swindon
- Malmesbury Abbey
- Maud Heath's Causeway, near Chippenham
- Mompesson House, Salisbury
- Old Sarum, the site of the former cathedral
- Philipps House & Dinton Park
- Richard Jefferies Birthplace and Museum, near Swindon
- REME Museum
- River Thames
- Salisbury Cathedral
- The Salisbury Museum
- Science Museum library and archives, Wroughton
- Shearwater Lake
- Silbury Hill
- Stonehenge
- Stourhead
- Swindon and Cricklade Railway
- Swindon Steam Railway Museum
- Trafalgar House
- Wardour Castle
- West Kennet Long Barrow
- Westbury White Horse
- Westwood Manor
- Woodhenge
- Wilton House
- Wilton Windmill
- Wilts & Berks Canal
- Wiltshire Museum, Devizes
- Win Green Down

Areas of countryside in Wiltshire include:

- Cranborne Chase
- Marlborough Downs
- Salisbury Plain
- Vale of Pewsey

== Transport ==
=== Road ===
Roads running through Wiltshire include The Ridgeway, an ancient route, and Roman roads, the Fosse Way, London to Bath road and Ermin Way. National Cycle Route 4 and the Thames Path, a modern long distance footpath, run through the county.

Routes through Wiltshire include:

- A4 road
- M4 motorway / M4 Corridor
- A303 trunk road
- A350 road
- A417 road

=== Navigable inland waterways ===
- River Thames
- Kennet and Avon Canal

=== Canals subject to restoration ===
- Thames and Severn Canal
- North Wilts Canal
- Wilts & Berks Canal

=== Rail ===
Three main railway routes, all of which carry passenger traffic, cross Wiltshire.

- Great Western Main Line (Swindon and Chippenham)
- Wessex Main Line (Bradford on Avon, Melksham, Trowbridge, Westbury, Warminster, Salisbury; connects to Chippenham)
- West of England line (Salisbury and Tisbury)

Other routes include:

- Reading to Taunton Line
- Heart of Wessex Line
- Golden Valley Line
- South Wales Main Line

The major junction stations are Salisbury and Westbury, and important junctions are also found at Swindon, Chippenham and Trowbridge.

There is also the Swindon and Cricklade Railway in the Thames Valley.

In general, Wiltshire is well served by rail, with 14 stations within its boundaries, although towns not served include Calne, Marlborough and Devizes. Several destinations on bus routes, including the aforementioned three towns, have integrated through ticketing, where one ticket may be bought to cover both the bus and rail journey.

=== Air ===
Airfields in Wiltshire include Old Sarum Airfield and Clench Common Airfield. RAF Lyneham was an air transport hub for British forces until its closure in 2012. Airports with scheduled services near Wiltshire include Bournemouth Airport, Bristol Airport, Cardiff Airport, Exeter Airport, Gloucestershire Airport, Oxford Airport, Heathrow Airport and Southampton Airport.

== See also ==
- Custos Rotulorum of Wiltshire – Keepers of the Rolls
- Flag of Wiltshire
- Grade I listed buildings in Wiltshire
- Great West Way
- Healthcare in Wiltshire
- High Sheriff of Wiltshire
- List of civil parishes in Wiltshire
- List of Deputy Lieutenants of Wiltshire
- List of English and Welsh endowed schools (19th century)#Wiltshire
- List of hills of Wiltshire
- List of paranormal events reported in Wiltshire, England
- List of Sites of Special Scientific Interest in Wiltshire
- Lord Lieutenant of Wiltshire
- The Vly be on the Turmut – unofficial song of the county
- Wiltshire (UK Parliament constituency)
- Wiltshire Horn, a breed of sheep
