= Stourton with Gasper =

Civil parish in Wiltshire, England

Coordinates: 51.106°N 2.318°W

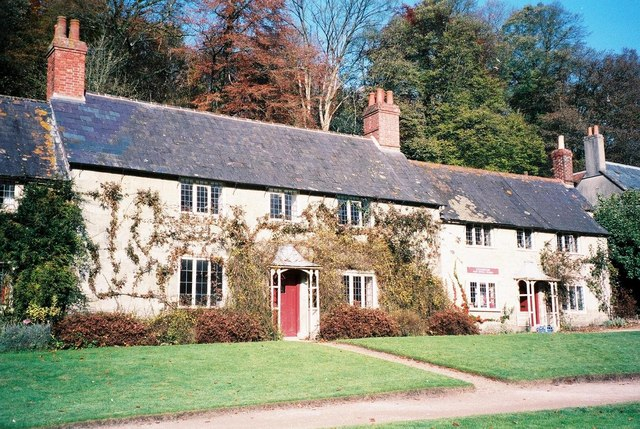
- Cottages at Stourton

- Location within Wiltshire
- Population: 201 (in 2001)
- OS grid reference: ST778341
- Civil parish: Stourton with Gasper
- Unitary authority: Wiltshire
- Ceremonial county: Wiltshire
- Region: South West
- Country: England
- Sovereign state: United Kingdom
- Post town: Warminster
- Postcode district: BA12
- Dialling code: 01747
- Police: Wiltshire
- Fire: Dorset and Wiltshire
- Ambulance: South Western
- UK Parliament: South West Wiltshire
- Website: Community

Stourton with Gasper is a civil parish in the southwest of the English county of Wiltshire. Its main settlement is the village of Stourton, along with the hamlets of Bonham and Gasper. The village is about 2 1/2 miles (4 km) northwest of the small town of Mere, and is part of the Stourhead estate, which includes much of the west of the parish. The estate is in the ownership of the National Trust, and the entrance to the estate's famous house and garden is through the village.

== Geography ==
The western boundary of the parish is also the boundary with the county of Somerset.

To the east of Stourton village lies the steep slopes and downland of White Sheet Hill, a section of which is within the civil parish. The A303 trunk road passes about 1.5 miles (2.4 km) to the south of the village.

Heath Hill Farm, in the west of the parish, is a Biological Site of Special Scientific Interest. The parish is on the western edge of the Cranborne Chase Area of Outstanding Natural Beauty.

Streams in the parish meet to form the River Stour, which flows south into Dorset.

== History ==
Several prehistoric sites in the area are scheduled ancient monuments. These include Park Hill Camp (within Stourhead grounds), a small Iron Age hillfort, containing a later Iron Age settlement; Kenwalch's Castle (on the Somerset border), a large Iron Age hillfort; and White Sheet Camp (to the east), another large hillfort, investigated in the 19th century by Sir Richard Colt Hoare.

About 1 1/2 miles (2.4 km) southwest of Stourton village are Pen Pits, a series of small circular pits where stone was quarried for quern stones, in the Iron Age, Roman and medieval periods. On part of the site stand the later earthwork remains of Castle Orchard, a motte-and-bailey castle, possibly Norman, with a motte diameter of about 55m. The site was first excavated by Augustus Pitt Rivers in 1879–80.

Domesday Book in 1086 recorded a settlement of 28 households at Stortone, and land held by Walter of Douai. Longleat Priory owned land at Stourton in the 13th century.

The Stourton family owned land from at least the 12th century, and their wealth was increased by William Stourton (d. 1413), a prominent lawyer, Member of Parliament, and in his last year Speaker of the House of Commons. His son John was elevated to Baron Stourton in 1448. It was at Stourton that he had custody of the French royal captive Charles, Duke of Orléans. The family were later persecuted as papists and suffered financial penalties, especially William, 11th Baron (c. 1594 – 1672). When Edward, 13th Baron succeeded his father in 1685, the estates were "greatly impoverished and encumbered". He began selling land in 1688, and raised mortgages against Stourton House and manor, which was eventually sold in 1714: most of the £19,400 proceeds were used to discharge the mortgages, leaving only some £775 for Lord Stourton.

The purchaser was Sir Thomas Meres, the main mortgage-holder. After his death in 1715, his son John sold the property, which was acquired in 1717 (formalised in 1720) by Henry Hoare, son of the founder of Hoare's Bank.

=== Stourhead House ===
Henry Hoare had Stourton House pulled down, and Stourhead House was built nearby between 1721 and 1724 to designs of Colen Campbell. Henry Hoare II designed gardens which were laid out between 1741 and 1780 around an artificial lake. The house was enlarged in 1796–1800, and in 1840 a tetrastyle portico was added. Most of the building was destroyed in a 1902 fire but it was rebuilt in the same style.

Sir Henry Hoare, whose son and heir had been killed in World War I, gave the house and gardens to the National Trust in 1946 and they are now open to the public. The house was recorded as Grade I listed in 1966.

=== Bonham and Gasper ===
The manors of Bonham and Gasper (also called Brook) were tithings of Stourton although they were part of Somerset's Norton Ferris Hundred. Boundary revisions in 1895 transferred the Somerset portion of the parish to Wiltshire.

Bonham is a family name, the first recorded resident being Sir John de Bonham in 1323. The manor was acquired by Thomas Stourton in 1714 and bought by Henry Hoare in 1785, the Stourton family retaining part of Bonham House and its Catholic chapel.

Gasper manor was bought by Sir Richard Colt Hoare in 1799.

=== 20th century ===
From 1942 to 1946, farmland in the south of the parish was the site of RAF Zeals, a grass runway airfield partly in Zeals parish.

The population of the parish slowly declined in the 20th century, reaching 201 at the time of the 2001 census. Services for visitors to the National Trust property provide some employment.

== Parish church ==
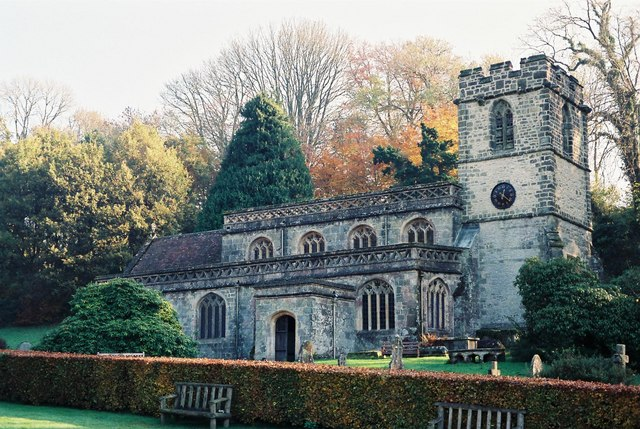
St Peter's Church

The parish church of St Peter dates in part from the early 14th century, although the earliest known record of a church at Stourton is in 1291.

The Stourtons were patrons of the church from the 15th century. After the Hoare family bought the Stourton estate in 1717, Henry Hoare made internal improvements and built a family vault. The architect and mason Nathaniel Ireson was churchwarden in the 1720s and may have done work on the church himself. The antiquarian William Coxe was rector from 1801 to 1811. In 1848 the church was enlarged by building a south aisle, in the same style as the 14th-century north aisle; further restoration took place in 1877 and 1937. The building is in dressed limestone, with 19th-century parapets pierced with triangles and lozenges.

The 12th-century cylindrical stone font was transferred from the redundant church at Monkton Deverill. Pevsner writes that the church has an "uncommonly large number" of monuments. The north chapel has a tomb chest with lying effigies of Edward Stourton, 6th Baron Stourton (died 1535) and his wife.

The six bells in the west tower include three from the 17th century. The church was recorded as Grade I listed in 1966.

In the churchyard, the chest tomb of Sir Richard Hoare, 2nd Baronet and other members of the Hoare family lies under a pinnacled 1819 Gothic canopy designed by John Pinch the Elder.

The benefice was united with that of Zeals in 1963, and the Upper Stour benefice was created in 1973 by uniting Bourton (in Dorset) with Zeals and Stourton. Kilmington joined in 1980 and Upper Stour continues today as a united parish covering the four churches.

== Notable buildings ==
In the west of the village, near the entrance to the Stourhead gardens, stands Bristol High Cross, a limestone market cross with eight statues. It stood at Bristol's central crossroads from 1373, and the upper four statues were added in 1633. The cross was moved to the city's College Green in 1736 but removed in 1762, and given to Henry Hoare who erected it here.

Outside the village, Bonham House and cottage are from the 14th century and are Grade II* listed. Lords of Stourton lived here and a Roman Catholic chapel was here from 1559 until 1950.

== Government ==
The civil parish elects a parish council. The parish is in the area of Wiltshire Council unitary authority, which performs all significant local government functions, and of the South West Wiltshire parliamentary constituency.

== Amenities ==
In Stourton village there is a village hall and a pub, the Spread Eagle Inn.

Stourton is home to Kilmington and Stourton Cricket Club who play in Divisions Four and Seven of the Somerset Cricket League.

The village is the start of the Stour Valley Way, a long-distance footpath which follows the River Stour south through Dorset to Hengistbury Head near Christchurch.
