= White Sheet Hill =

Hill in Wiltshire, England

Coordinates: 51.110474°N 2.281079°W

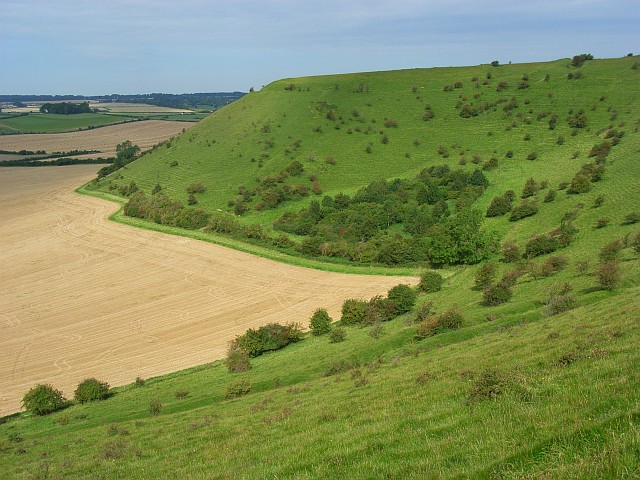

Highest point
- Elevation: 245 m (804 ft)

Geography
- Location: Wiltshire, England
- OS grid: ST803346
- Topo map: OS Landranger

Climbing
- Easiest route: Public footpaths and bridleways

White Sheet Hill, also known as Whitesheet Hill, is a hill in the English county of Wiltshire. As one of the most westerly areas of downland in Britain the area is noted for its chalky farmland which contains a rich variety of rare and protected fauna and flora. The hill is also the site of a Neolithic causeway camp and barrows; and an Iron Age hill fort. The Roman road which runs along the hill was at one time the main route through the Selwood Forest. The hill is part of the Stourhead estate and has been in the ownership of the National Trust since 1946.

The hill is the site of the 136.1 hectares (336 acres) Whitesheet Hill biological Site of Special Scientific Interest, notified in 1965. Both the National Trust and the Duchy of Cornwall own land within Whitesheet Hill SSSI.

White Sheet Hill is divided between the civil parishes of Kilmington, Mere and Stourton with Gasper. It is situated within the Cranborne Chase and West Wiltshire Downs Area of Outstanding Natural Beauty, and has extensive views over Somerset, Dorset and Wiltshire. It is home to White Sheet Radio Flying Club who use it as a slope soaring site for fun and competition flying.

== Prehistoric archaeology ==
There are some 12 ancient burial mounds (barrows) on the hill dating from 1800 BC, and a large Iron Age hillfort called White Sheet Camp.

The site was excavated by Sir Richard Hoare, 2nd Baronet in the early 19th century:

Immediately on ascending the hill called Whitesheet, we find ourselves surrounded by British antiquities. The road intersects an ancient earthen work, of a circular form, and which, from the slightness of its vallum, appears to have been of high antiquity. Adjoining it is a large barrow, which we opened in October 1807, and found it had contained a skeleton, and had been investigated before.

On a point of land near this barrow are three others, all of which, by the defaced appearance of their summits, seemed to have attracted the notice of former antiquaries. No 1, the nearest to the edge of the hill, had certainly been opened, and appears to have contained a double interment. The primary one was an interment of burned bones deposited within a shallow cist, in an urn rudely formed, and badly baked. Above it was a skeleton with its head laid towards the south, and which from its position and perfect preservation appears not to have been disturbed. Its mouth was wide open, and it "grinn'd horribly a ghastly smile," a singularity we have never before met with.

== See also ==
- Long Knoll
- Robin Hood's Ball
- Cadbury Castle, Somerset
- King Alfred's Tower
- Brimsdown Hill
- Heath Hill Farm
- List of hill forts in England
