= Listed buildings in Stourton with Gasper =

Buildings in Stourton with Gasper, Wiltshire, England

Stourton with Gasper is a village and civil parish in Wiltshire, England. It contains 60 listed buildings that are recorded in the National Heritage List for England. Of these 14 are grade I, one is grade II* and 45 are grade II.

This list is based on the information retrieved online from Historic England.

== Key ==
Grade	Criteria
I	Buildings that are of exceptional interest
II*	Particularly important buildings of more than special interest
II	Buildings that are of special interest

== Listing ==
Name	Grade	Location	Type	Completed (Note: The date given is the date used by Historic England as significant for the initial building or that of an important part in the structure's description.)	Date designated	Grid ref. (Note: The grid reference is based on the British national grid reference system, sometimes known as OSGB36, used by the Ordnance Survey.) Geo-coordinates	Notes	Entry number (Note: The "List Entry Number" is a unique number assigned to each listed building and scheduled monument by Historic England.)	Image	Wikidata
Bonham Cottage Bonham House	II*	Bonham Lane			17 December 1954	ST7726733210; 51°05′52″N 2°19′34″W		1131128	Upload Photo	Q17542968
Bonham Farmhouse	II	Bonham Lane			9 September 1987	ST7723933215; 51°05′52″N 2°19′35″W		1131129	Upload Photo	Q26424089
Gateway in Wall to South of Bonham House	II	Bonham Lane			9 September 1987	ST7726133168; 51°05′51″N 2°19′34″W		1198813	Upload Photo	Q26494772
Drove Lodge	II	Frome Road	gatehouse		9 September 1987	ST7815334467; 51°06′33″N 2°18′48″W		1198821	Drove Lodge More images	Q26494780
Milestone About 150 Metres South of Junction with Long Lane	II	Frome Road			9 September 1987	ST7820534658; 51°06′39″N 2°18′46″W		1318446	Upload Photo	Q26604593
Brook Cottage	II	Gasper Street			9 September 1987	ST7623133075; 51°05′47″N 2°20′27″W		1131130	Upload Photo	Q26424090
Gasper Cottage	II	Gasper Street			9 September 1987	ST7640433002; 51°05′45″N 2°20′18″W		1318447	Upload Photo	Q26604594
Gasper Farmhouse	II	Gasper Street			9 September 1987	ST7631133034; 51°05′46″N 2°20′23″W		1198844	Upload Photo	Q26494802
Heath Hill Farmhouse	II	Gasper Street			9 September 1987	ST7593433359; 51°05′56″N 2°20′42″W		1283667	Upload Photo	Q26572502
Lake View	II	Gasper Street			9 September 1987	ST7659332936; 51°05′43″N 2°20′08″W		1131131	Upload Photo	Q26424091
The Old Laundry	II	Gasper Street			9 September 1987	ST7690332964; 51°05′44″N 2°19′52″W		1198850	Upload Photo	Q26494808
Clock Tower Lodge	II	High Street	gatehouse		9 September 1987	ST7788134121; 51°06′21″N 2°19′02″W		1131133	Clock Tower Lodge More images	Q26424093
1, High Street	II	1, High Street			9 September 1987	ST7801034075; 51°06′20″N 2°18′56″W		1198887	Upload Photo	Q26494848
2 and 3, High Street	II	2 and 3, High Street			9 September 1987	ST7799634077; 51°06′20″N 2°18′56″W		1131132	Upload Photo	Q26424092
4 and 5, High Street	II	4 and 5, High Street			9 September 1987	ST7802034073; 51°06′20″N 2°18′55″W		1318448	Upload Photo	Q26604595
87 and 88, High Street	II	87 and 88, High Street	building		9 September 1987	ST7757133997; 51°06′17″N 2°19′18″W		1198927	87 and 88, High Street More images	Q26494434
89, High Street	II	89, High Street	building		9 September 1987	ST7756133994; 51°06′17″N 2°19′19″W		1131134	89, High Street More images	Q26424094
Barnes Monument in the Churchyard About 1.5 Metres North of Church of St Peter	II	High Street			9 September 1987	ST7763833958; 51°06′16″N 2°19′15″W		1318469	Upload Photo	Q26604614
Church of St Peter	I	High Street	church building		6 January 1966	ST7763733945; 51°06′16″N 2°19′15″W		1318468	Church of St Peter More images	Q17529961
Churchyard Cross About 10 Metres North East of Chancel of Church of St Peter	II	High Street			6 January 1966	ST7764833962; 51°06′16″N 2°19′14″W		1131098	Upload Photo	Q26424061
Circular Monument in the Churchyard About 8 Metres North of Tower of Church of St Peter	II	High Street			9 September 1987	ST7760633943; 51°06′16″N 2°19′16″W		1318470	Upload Photo	Q26604615
Clock Tower Gateway	II	High Street	gate		9 September 1987	ST7786734117; 51°06′21″N 2°19′03″W		1283652	Clock Tower Gateway More images	Q26572487
Gate Piers and Wall Between Stourton Club and the Spread Eagle	II	High Street	gatepost		9 September 1987	ST7765234006; 51°06′18″N 2°19′14″W		1318467	Gate Piers and Wall Between Stourton Club and the Spread Eagle More images	Q26604613
Hoare Monument in the Churchyard About 13 Metres South East of Chancel of Church of St Peter	II	High Street	building		9 September 1987	ST7766533951; 51°06′16″N 2°19′13″W		1131095	Hoare Monument in the Churchyard About 13 Metres South East of Chancel of Church of St Peter More images	Q26424058
Stourton Club with East Side of Spread Eagle Yard	II	High Street			9 September 1987	ST7767134012; 51°06′18″N 2°19′13″W		1318450	Stourton Club with East Side of Spread Eagle Yard More images	Q26604597
Stourton Post Office and Stores	II	High Street	post office		9 September 1987	ST7758234000; 51°06′17″N 2°19′18″W		1318449	Stourton Post Office and Stores More images	Q26604596
The Estate Office	II	High Street	architectural structure		9 September 1987	ST7760634018; 51°06′18″N 2°19′16″W		1198911	The Estate Office More images	Q26494875
The Spread Eagle Inn	II	High Street	inn		9 September 1987	ST7764533991; 51°06′17″N 2°19′14″W		1131094	The Spread Eagle Inn More images	Q26424057
Three Faugoin Monuments in the Churchyard Between 1.5 and 5 Metres North of Tower of Church of St Peter	II	High Street			9 September 1987	ST7762433941; 51°06′16″N 2°19′15″W		1131097	Upload Photo	Q26424060
Two Hoare Monuments in the Churchyard About 1 Metre East of Church of St Peter	II	High Street			9 September 1987	ST7765233954; 51°06′16″N 2°19′14″W		1131096	Upload Photo	Q26424059
St Peters Pump	I	Six Wells Bottom, Stourhead Park	architectural structure		6 January 1966	ST7610335399; 51°07′03″N 2°20′34″W		1131107	St Peters Pump More images	Q17529452
Grotto Underpass	II	Stourhead Gardens	subway		9 September 1987	ST7746933888; 51°06′14″N 2°19′23″W		1283534	Grotto Underpass More images	Q26572378
Horse Trough in Lake on South Side of Garden Lake Dam	II	Stourhead Gardens			9 September 1987	ST7722733855; 51°06′13″N 2°19′36″W		1199247	Upload Photo	Q26495143
Rockwork Boathouse	II	Stourhead Gardens	boathouse		9 September 1987	ST7736434054; 51°06′19″N 2°19′29″W		1199203	Rockwork Boathouse More images	Q26495103
Rockwork Bridge	I	Stourhead Gardens	footbridge		6 January 1966	ST7726633837; 51°06′12″N 2°19′34″W		1199172	Rockwork Bridge More images	Q17529634
Small Grotto Below Temple of Flora	II	Stourhead Gardens	building		9 September 1987	ST7741334016; 51°06′18″N 2°19′26″W		1131101	Small Grotto Below Temple of Flora More images	Q26424062
The Bristol High Cross	I	Stourhead Gardens	high cross		9 September 1987	ST7755233964; 51°06′16″N 2°19′19″W		1318471	The Bristol High Cross More images	Q4968924
The Gothic Cottage	I	Stourhead Gardens	cottage		6 January 1966	ST7711434006; 51°06′18″N 2°19′42″W		1199233	The Gothic Cottage More images	Q17529638
The Grotto and the River God's Cave	I	Stourhead Gardens	architectural structure		6 January 1966	ST7714934085; 51°06′20″N 2°19′40″W		1318473	The Grotto and the River God's Cave More images	Q17529965
The Iron Bridge	II	Stourhead Gardens	bridge		9 September 1987	ST7706533861; 51°06′13″N 2°19′44″W		1131103	The Iron Bridge More images	Q26424064
The Palladian Bridge	I	Stourhead Gardens	footbridge		6 January 1966	ST7743833952; 51°06′16″N 2°19′25″W		1131099	The Palladian Bridge More images	Q17529437
The Pantheon	I	Stourhead Gardens	architectural structure		6 January 1966	ST7705933916; 51°06′15″N 2°19′45″W		1131102	The Pantheon More images	Q17529443
The Paradise Well	I	Stourhead Gardens	water well		6 January 1966	ST7741134022; 51°06′18″N 2°19′26″W		1283514	The Paradise Well More images	Q17529867
The Temple of Apollo	I	Stourhead Gardens	temple		6 January 1966	ST7738533831; 51°06′12″N 2°19′28″W		1131100	The Temple of Apollo More images	Q17529441
The Temple of Flora	I	Stourhead Gardens	temple		6 January 1966	ST7742334015; 51°06′18″N 2°19′26″W		1318472	The Temple of Flora More images	Q123992402
Granary in the Stable Yard	II	Stourhead Park	granary		9 September 1987	ST7783534193; 51°06′24″N 2°19′05″W		1131105	Granary in the Stable Yard More images	Q26424065
Icehouse at Approximately 100 Metres South South East of Stourhead House	II	Stourhead Park			9 September 1987	ST7777334220; 51°06′25″N 2°19′08″W		1199299	Upload Photo	Q26495190
Range of Stables and Carriage Houses on West Side of Stable Yard	II	Stourhead Park	building		9 September 1987	ST7779434224; 51°06′25″N 2°19′07″W		1131106	Range of Stables and Carriage Houses on West Side of Stable Yard More images	Q26424066
South Range of Workshops on South Side of Stable Yard	II	Stourhead Park	architectural structure		9 September 1987	ST7779834185; 51°06′24″N 2°19′07″W		1199329	South Range of Workshops on South Side of Stable Yard More images	Q26495217
Stable on West Corner of North Side of Stable Yard	II	Stourhead Park	stable		9 September 1987	ST7781034236; 51°06′25″N 2°19′06″W		1283420	Stable on West Corner of North Side of Stable Yard More images	Q26572274
Stourhead House	I	Stourhead Park	country house		6 January 1966	ST7775434347; 51°06′29″N 2°19′09″W		1131104	Stourhead House More images	Q17529448
Terrace Lodge	II	Stourhead Park			9 September 1987	ST7708834653; 51°06′39″N 2°19′43″W		1131108	Upload Photo	Q26424067
The Convent	I	Stourhead Park	thatched cottage		6 January 1966	ST7568734692; 51°06′40″N 2°20′55″W		1318474	The Convent More images	Q17529969
The Obelisk	I	Stourhead Park	obelisk		6 January 1966	ST7732134500; 51°06′34″N 2°19′31″W		1283405	The Obelisk More images	Q17529862
35, Stourton Lane	II	35, Stourton Lane			9 September 1987	ST7739635282; 51°06′59″N 2°19′28″W		1199395	Upload Photo	Q26495281
Long Lane End	II	36, Stourton Lane			9 September 1987	ST7738935464; 51°07′05″N 2°19′28″W		1131109	Upload Photo	Q26424068
66, Stourton Lane	II	66, Stourton Lane			9 September 1987	ST7734235463; 51°07′05″N 2°19′30″W		1199386	Upload Photo	Q26495271
Myrtle Tree Cottage	II	Stourton Lane			9 September 1987	ST7774934908; 51°06′47″N 2°19′09″W		1318475	Upload Photo	Q26604616
59, Top Lane	II	59, Top Lane			9 September 1987	ST7665833455; 51°06′00″N 2°20′05″W		1199403	Upload Photo	Q26495290
The Kennels	II	Zeals Road			9 September 1987	ST7698833476; 51°06′00″N 2°19′48″W		1131110	Upload Photo	Q26424069

== See also ==
- Grade I listed buildings in Wiltshire
- Grade II* listed buildings in Wiltshire

== Sources ==
- Orbach, Julian; Pevsner, Nikolaus; Cherry, Bridget (2021), Wiltshire, The Buildings of England, New Haven and London: Yale University Press, ISBN 978-0-300-25120-3
