= Zeals =

Village in Wiltshire, England

Coordinates: 51.085°N 2.315°W

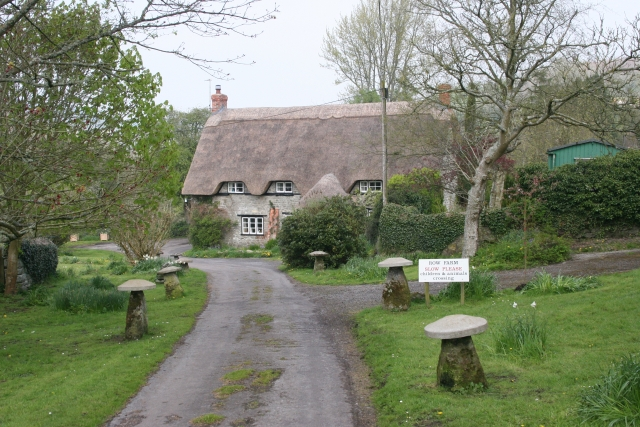
- House at Zeals Row

- Location within Wiltshire
- Population: 658 (2011)
- OS grid reference: ST780317
- Civil parish: Zeals
- Unitary authority: Wiltshire
- Ceremonial county: Wiltshire
- Region: South West
- Country: England
- Sovereign state: United Kingdom
- Post town: Warminster
- Postcode district: BA12
- Dialling code: 01747
- Police: Wiltshire
- Fire: Dorset and Wiltshire
- Ambulance: South Western
- UK Parliament: South West Wiltshire
- Website: Parish Council

Zeals is a village and civil parish in southwest Wiltshire, England. The village is about 2.2 miles (3.5 km) west of Mere, next to the A303 road towards Wincanton, and adjoins the villages of Bourton, Dorset and Penselwood, Somerset. Its name comes from the Old English sealh meaning a small willow or sallow.

The civil parish includes the hamlets of Long Cross, White Cross, Lower Zeals and Wolverton. The River Stour forms the west boundary of the parish.

== History ==
There are no known prehistoric sites within the modern parish. Nearby on the other side of the Stour valley are Pen Pits, a series of small circular pits where greensand stone was quarried to make querns for hand grinding corn, in the Iron Age, Roman and medieval periods. Also here is Orchard Castle or Castle Orchard, the remains of a medieval motte-and-bailey fortification.

In 1086 the Domesday Book recorded two estates at Sele: Lower Zeals (later the Manor of Zeals, or Clevedon) and Higher Zeals (later Zeals Aylesbury). Estimates suggest a population of around 40–50 at Lower Zeals and 85–95 at Higher Zeals at that time.

Zeals was anciently a tithing of Mere parish but was made a separate civil parish in 1896.

A school was provided in 1846, and a larger building erected in 1874 on a site northeast of the church. By 1911 there were 31 infants and 50 older children. A classroom was added in the 1950s, and in 1955 the school gained voluntary controlled status. The village school at Stourton closed in 1965 and pupils transferred to Zeals. New school buildings opened in 1975, immediately north of the old school.

There was a second school, opened in 1840 by Congregationalists at Winbrook, south of Zeals village, and intended for children from Bourton and Penselwood as well as Zeals. When a new Congregational chapel was built in 1856 the school moved into the old chapel, in the same area, and around that time became a British School. Early in the 20th century it was taken over by Wiltshire Council and became Winbrook School. In 1907 there were 70 pupils, but numbers later fell and in 1932 the 41 children transferred to the church school.

The A303 trunk road, taking traffic from London via Andover to Wincanton and the southwest, passed through the village until 1992, when it was diverted to the south.

== Notable buildings ==
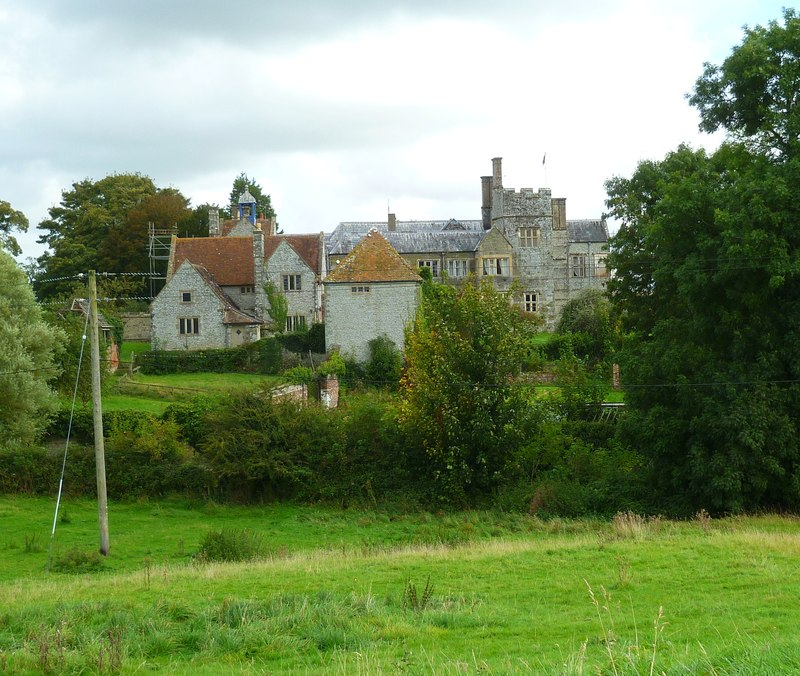
Zeals House, west side

Zeals House at Lower Zeals (east of Zeals village) is a Grade I listed former manor house with a 14th-century range. It was owned by the Chafyn family, later the Chafyn-Groves, from the 15th century until the mid 20th. Additions were made in the 17th century and the 1860s, resulting in a large L-shaped country house having a tower with battlemented parapet, one-and-a-half storeys above the rest. In 2001, the ten-bedroom house was sold for £2.4 million.

Four associated buildings are Grade II listed: the small orangery, mid 18th century; the stable block and carriage house, brick, probably late 18th century; a small square dovecote in rubble stone under a pyramidal tiled roof, of similar date; and the granary, early 19th century, in light timber frame and brick. There are lodges at two entrances to the grounds: a pair of small square buildings at the north entrance, and a two-storey stone house dated 1878 at the south.

Zeals has a set of Tudor revival-style almshouses that were built in 1865 for William Chafyn-Grove. Together with the parish hall, they are Grade II listed.

== Church and chapels ==
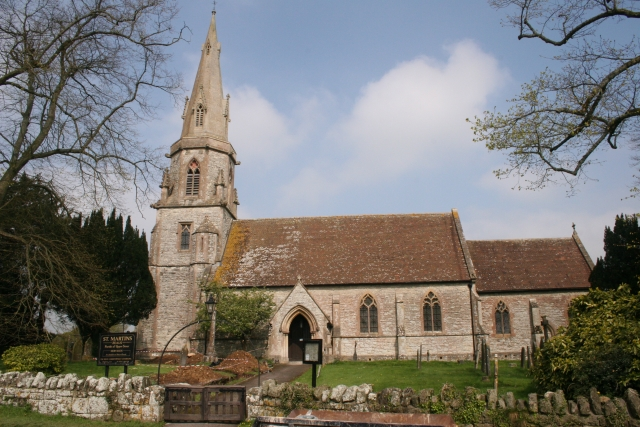
St Martin's Church

The Church of England parish church of Saint Martin was built using local limestone in 1842–44, to decorated gothic designs by the Gothic Revival architect George Gilbert Scott; it is among his earlier works. Money was raised by Rev. William Frederick Grove, a relative of the Groves of Zeals House, and the Duke of Somerset provided the land. The church was consecrated on 14 October 1846 as a chapel of ease of the parish of Mere, then on 27 June 1848 Zeals was made a separate ecclesiastical parish and St. Martin's became the parish church. In 1876, Julia Chafyn Grove gave money for fittings including the organ, reredos and five of the bells, and for the addition of a spire to the tower. The church was designated as Grade II* listed in 1966.

The benefice was united with Stourton in 1963, and today the church is part of the parish of Upper Stour, alongside Bourton, Kilmington and Stourton.

Zeals had a Congregational chapel from 1832 to 1980 and a Methodist chapel from 1852 to 1973.

== Amenities ==
Whitesheet Church of England Primary Academy, near the church in Zeals village, serves the parish and surrounding area. Since 2003 it has operated on two sites, with younger children attending the school at Kilmington and older children at Zeals.

The village has a pub, the Bell and Crown. The Monarch's Way long-distance footpath passes through Zeals and Wolverton, and the Stour Valley Way crosses the far west of the parish.

== Notable people ==
Notable members of the Grove family at Zeals House include William Chaffin Grove (c. 1731–1793), lawyer and Member of Parliament for Shaftesbury, and later for the Weymouth and Melcombe Regis seat. A later William Chafyn Grove built the 1865 almshouses as a memorial to his mother. His sister Julia Chafyn Grove (d. 1897) provided Zeals village hall in 1888; her other philanthropy included paying for the building of a school at Mere. She left money for education in Salisbury which resulted in the naming of Chafyn Grove School in 1916.

Herbert Holman, first husband of actress Vivien Leigh, bought Manor Farmhouse (near Zeals House) soon after their divorce in 1940; Leigh often visited him and their daughter Suzanne there. The property was inherited by the daughter (by then Suzanne Farrington) after his death in 1982, and she lived there until her death in 2015.

== Zeals airfield ==
North of Zeals village, next to the village of Stourton and the Stourhead estate, is the site of the former RAF Zeals, also known as HMS Hummingbird and RNAS Zeals. The airfield operated between May 1942 and June 1946, and during this short time was used by the Royal Air Force, the United States Army Air Forces and the Royal Navy.

Until August 1943 RAF Fighter Command used it as a fighter airfield for Hurricanes and Spitfires. The station was transferred in August 1943 to the USAAF whose initial plan was to use the airfield to maintain C-47 Skytrain transport aircraft. However, the damp conditions prevented heavy loads so P-47 Thunderbolt fighter aircraft were flown from Zeals instead. From March 1944 the airfield reverted to the RAF who posted Mosquito there to intercept incoming German bombers. Following D-Day the RAF used the airfield for glider training in preparation for action against Japan, and in April 1945 the airfield was transferred to the Royal Navy, and was commissioned HMS Heron using the airfield for aircraft carrier training.

The airfield closed on 1 January 1946, although the RN stayed until June 1946 when it was returned to farmland. As of 2006, the control tower, now a private house, remains on Bells Lane in Zeals.

A memorial stands at nearby Beech Clump in Stourton to mark the site where an RAF transport plane crashed on 19 February 1945, killing 21 on board. The plane had taken off from Zeals airfield to return to Leicester after two weeks of glider training and flew into cloud-covered beech trees on the knoll.
