= Stour Valley Way =

Footpath in southern England

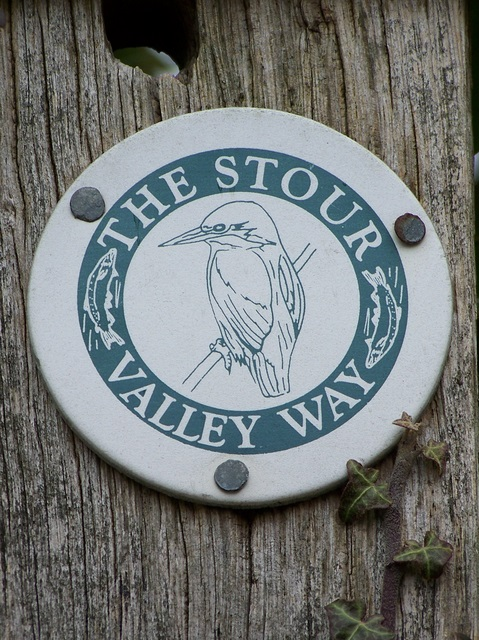
Sign for the Stour Valley Way

The Stour Valley Way is a 64-mile (103 km) long-distance footpath in southern England. From Stourton, Wiltshire, the path travels southeast through Dorset to Hengistbury Head near Christchurch.

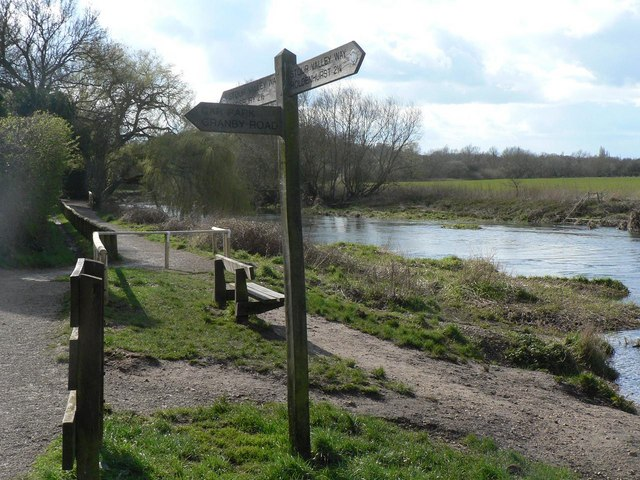
The Stour Valley Way at Muscliff

The path uses public rights of way and permissive paths to follow the course of the River Stour. About 3 miles (5 km) from Stourton, west of Zeals, the path crosses briefly to the Somerset bank of the river where it intersects the east–west Monarch's Way footpath, then enters Dorset north of Bourton. The route later passes through the towns of Wimborne and Gillingham, and the villages of Silton, Milton-on-Stour, Ecclife, West Stour, Stour Provost, Fifehead Magdalen, Marnhull, Sturminster Newton, Child Okeford, Stourpaine, Bryanston, Blandford St. Mary, Charlton Marshall, Shapwick, Oakley, Canford Magna, Knighton, Dudsbury and Holdenhurst.

There are ferry crossings between Hengistbury Head and Christchurch town quay or Mudeford quay.

The path has two alternative sections which can be used to form circular walks: one to the southwest of Wimborne, and the other to the southwest of Bournemouth Airport.

The footpath is waymarked and is shown as a series of coloured diamonds on Ordnance Survey 1:25,000 and 1:50,000 maps.

== See also ==
- List of long-distance footpaths in the United Kingdom
