= Barrow Street =

Barrow Street may refer to:

- Barrow Street (Manhattan), an arts area in the West Village
- Barrow Street, Dublin, Dublin, and the home of Ireland's National Performing Arts School, Google Europe, and rock band U2's The Factory studio complex, among many other high-profile tenants
- Barrow Street, Wiltshire, a village in the south of England
- Barrow Street Press, a New York–based publisher of poetry books
  - Barrow Street (magazine), a literary journal published by Barrow Street Press
- Barrow Street Theatre, New York
