= 704 Naval Air Squadron =

Inactive flying squadron of the Royal Navy's Fleet Air Arm

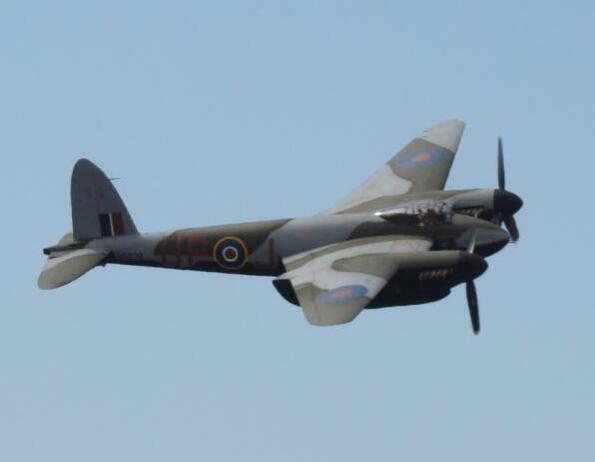
- de Havilland Mosquito T Mk.III; an example of the type used by 704 Squadron
- Active: 1945
- Disbanded: 2 December 1945
- Country: United Kingdom
- Branch: Royal Navy
- Type: Fleet Air Arm Second Line Squadron
- Role: Naval Operational Training Unit
- Size: Squadron
- Part of: Fleet Air Arm
- Home station: See Naval air stations section for full list.

Insignia
- Identification Markings: FD3A+

Aircraft flown
- Attack: de Havilland Mosquito
- Trainer: Airspeed Oxford

704 Naval Air Squadron (704 NAS), sometimes alluded to as 704 Squadron, is an inactive Fleet Air Arm (FAA) naval air squadron of the United Kingdom’s Royal Navy (RN). It formed as an Operational Training Unit, at RNAS Zeals (HMS Hummingbird) in Wiltshire, in April 1945, operating with de Havilland Mosquito aircraft. The squadron later moved to RAF Thorney Island in West Sussex, in the September, and continued with de Havilland Mosquito conversion courses, however the squadron disbanded in December 1945.

== History ==
=== Naval Operational Training Unit (1945) ===
On 11 April 1945, 704 Naval Air Squadron was formed at RNAS Zeals (HMS Hummingbird), located near the village of Zeals in Wiltshire, as a Naval Operational Training Unit, for the conversion of de Havilland Mosquito aircrew. The squadron was equipped with de Havilland Mosquito, a British twin-engined, multirole combat aircraft. It mainly operated with the FB.VI strike ("fighter-bomber") variant and also had a smaller number of T.III two-seat trainer versions.

On 20 June four of the aircraft were detached to 703 Naval Air Squadron which was operating at RAF Thorney Island, located on Thorney Island, West Sussex. These aircraft were utilised for development work in conjunction with the Royal Air Force’s Air-Sea Warfare Development Unit (ASWDU). The rest of 704 NAS relocated to RAF Thorney Island on 4 September and the detachment was incorporated back into the squadron. Three months later the squadron disbanded on 2 December 1945 when it was absorbed into 762 Naval Air Squadron, a Twin Engine Conversion Unit.

== Aircraft flown ==
The squadron operated a couple of different aircraft types:

- de Havilland Mosquito T Mk.III trainer aircraft (October - December 1945)
- de Havilland Mosquito FB Mk.VI fighter-bomber (April - July 1945)
- de Havilland Mosquito B Mk.25 bomber (June - September 1945)
- Airspeed Oxford training aircraft (September - November 1945)

== Naval air stations ==
704 Naval Air Squadron operated from one naval air stations of the Royal Navy and one Royal Air Force station, both in England:

- Royal Naval Air Station Zeals (HMS Hummingbird), Wiltshire, (11 April 1945 - 4 September 1945)
  - Royal Air Force Thorney Island, Sussex, (Detachment four aircraft 20 June - 4 September 1945)
- Royal Air Force Thorney Island, Sussex, (4 September 1945 - 2 December 1945)
- disbanded - (2 December 1945)

== Commanding officers ==
List of commanding officers of 704 Naval Air Squadron with date of appointment:

- Lieutenant Commander(A) S.M.P. Walsh, DSC & Bar, RNVR, from 11 April 1945
- Lieutenant Commander P.A.M. Hudson, DSC, RN, from 25 August 1945
- disbanded - 2 December 1945

Note: Abbreviation (A) signifies Air Branch of the RN or RNVR.
