= Suzanne Farrington =

British daughter of actress Vivien Leigh (1933–2015)

- Farrington (centre) with her then-stepfather Laurence Olivier and mother Vivien Leigh in 1950
- Born: Suzanne Holman; 12 October 1933; Marylebone, London, England
- Died: 1 March 2015 (aged 81); Lower Zeals, Wiltshire, England
- Spouse: Robin Neville Farrington (m. 1957; died 2002)
- Children: 3
- Mother: Vivien Leigh
- Relatives: Laurence Olivier (stepfather)

Suzanne Farrington (née Holman; 12 October 1933 – 1 March 2015) was the only child of British actress Vivien Leigh and her first husband, Herbert Leigh Holman. Upon her mother's death, Farrington was bequeathed her mother's papers, including her letters, photographs, contracts, and diaries.

== Life ==
=== Early life ===
Farrington was born Suzanne Holman on 12 October 1933 at a nursing home at 8 Bulstrode Street, London. Her mother, Vivien Leigh, was 19 years old, and had been married to Farrington's father, barrister Herbert Leigh Holman, for less than a year. Leigh's diary entry on this day simply read: "Had a baby – a girl." The birth was difficult: Farrington was born a month prematurely and the delivery was not an easy one. It was several weeks before mother and daughter came home, but once there it did not take Leigh long to become bored, as the household was being run quite adequately by the staff, and the baby was tended to by the nurse-nanny. The Holman household consisted of a maid, cook, and Nanny Oake, who had been hired to care for the baby.

Although Leigh concentrated on her acting career, soon receiving good notices in the play The Mask of Virtue, she did occasionally appear in the role of the new mother, being photographed holding her baby. Leigh became more involved in and more successful with her acting career, while Holman and her daughter became less important.

Although Leigh initially had great concern for her daughter's well-being, her career was paramount. In Leigh's own words, "I loved my baby as every mother does, but with the clear-cut sincerity of youth I realised that I could not abandon all thought of a career on the stage." Farrington's care became the responsibility of Holman, her maternal grandmother Gertrude Hartley, and numerous nannies. During the Second World War, Farrington travelled to Canada with her grandmother to stay with her aunt, Florence Thompson.

In 1940, Leigh and Holman divorced due to Holman's disapproval of Leigh's career, as well as Leigh's extramarital affair with Laurence Olivier. Holman gained custody over Farrington and bought Manor Farm House at Zeals, Wiltshire, for them both to live in.

During the war, Farrington began her education at a convent school in Vancouver; in November 1940, Leigh visited her there. The visit turned out to be traumatic for all involved, as the media soon discovered that "Scarlett" was in Vancouver, and that Farrington was enrolled in a convent school, spurring not only unwanted publicity for Farrington but spurious claims that she would be the subject of a kidnapping. The Reverend Mother also feared for the safety of other children in her care and declared she could not care for Farrington, whose parents were divorced. Subsequently, Farrington was transferred by her grandmother to a day school. Gertrude Hartley altered her plans and remained with her granddaughter throughout the war years.

David O. Selznick proposed that Olivier, Leigh and Suzanne should all appear in the film Jane Eyre (1943), with Olivier playing Rochester, Leigh playing the titular Jane Eyre and Suzanne playing a younger version of her mother. Vivien Leigh declined on behalf of all of them, as did Holman. Eventually, the role of young Jane went to Peggy Ann Garner.

After her marriage to Laurence Olivier, Leigh had little contact with Farrington until 1950. During this time, Farrington became close with Simon Tarquin Olivier, Laurence Olivier's son from his marriage to Jill Esmond. Her "coming out" party was held at the Oliviers' flat in Lowndes Square, London.

=== Later years and marriage ===
After completing her education at Sherborne School for Girls (in Dorset) and a Swiss finishing school, beginning in 1951, Farrington studied for two years at the Royal Academy of Dramatic Art. Although hoping to become an actress, she changed her mind after her appearance at the faculty's annual performance in March 1953.

Film historian Kendra Bean described Farrington's formative and later life, during which her grandmother continued to act as a "surrogate mother." During the late 1950s, she instructed at her grandmother's Academy of Beauty Culture in Knightsbridge, London. Farrington continued her close friendship with Tarquin Olivier.

By the late 1950s, Farrington and Leigh began a more intimate mother-daughter relationship, with Leigh visiting her daughter's house in Zeals, Wiltshire, and Farrington often travelling and holidaying with both her biological parents. (Note: Leigh Holman not only was actively involved in his child's upbringing, he remained close to Vivien throughout her life and was a calming influence when her manic depressive bouts became severe.) After returning from a holiday in Italy with her parents, on 6 December 1957, she married the insurance broker and executive Robin Farrington, also a decorated platoon commander who had served in Palestine in 1948. The reception was held at the Hyde Park Hotel, London. Both Holman and Leigh, who maintained a strong friendship despite the divorce, attended, as did Olivier. Between 1958 and 1962, Farrington gave birth to three sons. The Farringtons divided their time between Wiltshire and London and were married until Robin's death on 13 June 2002.

After the death of her mother on 8 July 1967, Farrington received the bulk of the estate. With the full support of her mother's long-time caretaker and partner Jack Merivale, she received Leigh's private papers, which included letters, photographs, contracts and diaries from 1932 onwards.

When Holman died on 8 February 1982, Suzanne inherited the Zeals house. In the late 1980s, author Hugo Vickers contacted her to access Leigh's papers to write Vivien Leigh: A Biography (1988). In 2005, biographer Terry Coleman was able to access Leigh's papers when he wrote Olivier, The Authorised Biography, and he thanked Farrington in the foreword. The Victoria and Albert Museum acquired Leigh's archive in 2013.

Farrington died in Lower Zeals, Wiltshire, on 1 March 2015, aged 81.

== Bibliography ==
- Bean, Kendra. Vivien Leigh: An Intimate Portrait. Philadelphia, Pennsylvania: Running Press, 2013; ISBN 978-0-7624-5099-2.
- Capus, Michelangelo. Vivien Leigh: A Biography. Jefferson, North Carolina: McFarland & Company, 2003; ISBN 978-0-7864-1497-0.
- Coleman, Terry. Olivier: The Authorised Biography. London: Bloomsbury Publishing, 2005; ISBN 0-7475-8306-4.
- Dent, Alan. Vivian Leigh: a Bouquet. London: Hamilton, 1969; ISBN 978-0-2410-1806-4
- Edwards, Anne. Vivien Leigh, A Biography. London: Coronet Books, 1978 edition; ISBN 0-340-23024-X
- Spoto, Donald. Laurence Olivier: A Biography. London: Cooper Square Press, 2001; ISBN 978-0-8154-1146-8
- Taylor, John Russell. Vivien Leigh. London: Elm Tree Books, 1984; ISBN 0-241-11333-4
- Vickers, Hugo. Vivien Leigh: A Biography. London: Little, Brown and Company, 1988 edition; ISBN 978-0-33031-166-3
- Walker, Alexander. Vivien: The Life of Vivien Leigh. New York: Grove Press, 1987; ISBN 0-8021-3259-6
- Madrid, José Vivien Leigh. The Scarlett O'Hara tragedy Madrid, Spain: T&B Editores, 2013; ISBN 978-84-15405-65-8
