= Hillbrush =

British company

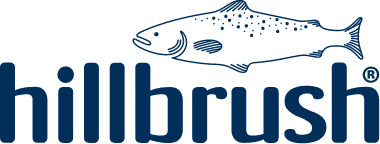
- Hillbrush's logo since 2016
- Industry: Cleaning products
- Founded: 1922; 103 years ago
- Founders: Fred Coward; Bill Coward
- Headquarters: Mere, Wiltshire, United Kingdom
- Area served: Worldwide

Hillbrush, also known as The Hill Brush Company, is a British manufacturing, cleaning product, and hygiene company. Established in 1922 by Fred and Bill Coward as a family business, Hillbrush focuses on brush development, with other products including squeegees, shovels, buckets, and paddles.

== History ==
=== 1900s ===
Hillbrush was founded in 1922 by Fred and Bill Coward in Mere, Wiltshire, England. The Coward brothers produced wooden-backed brushes, later bringing their respective sons into the business and expanding their services to include plastic-backed brushes for the food and beverage industries. Hillbrush was one of the first companies to create a brush fibre-dressing department, established in 1926. In 1952, Queen Elizabeth II visited Hillbrush's property and the company was granted a Royal Warrant in 1981.

=== 2000s ===
In 2001, Hillbrush purchased Champion Brush Inc., based in Baltimore, Maryland, United States. In 2016, Hillbrush moved to a new facility at Norwood Park, on the outskirts of Mere, Wiltshire, and rebranded its logo. A museum, Visit Hillbrush, opened in 2017 to commemorate the history of brush-making and the company's history. Hillbrush celebrated its centenary in 2022.
