= Kilmington, Wiltshire =

Village in Wiltshire, England

Coordinates: 51.127°N 2.327°W

Kilmington
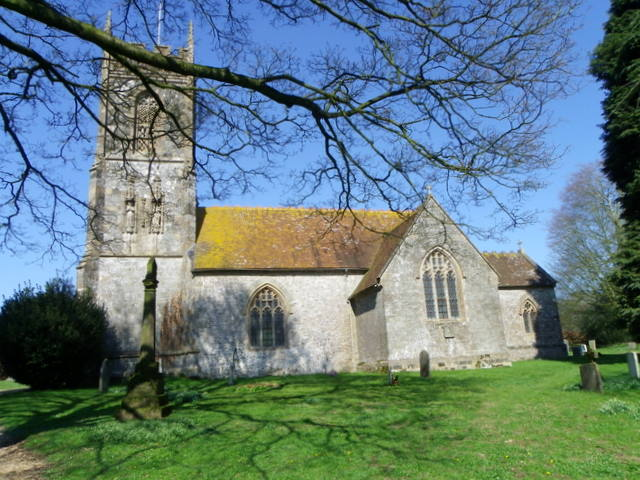
- St Mary's Church, Kilmington

- Location within Wiltshire
- Population: 328 (in 2011)
- OS grid reference: ST772365
- Unitary authority: Wiltshire
- Ceremonial county: Wiltshire
- Region: South West
- Country: England
- Sovereign state: United Kingdom
- Post town: Warminster
- Postcode district: BA12
- Dialling code: 01985
- Police: Wiltshire
- Fire: Dorset and Wiltshire
- Ambulance: South Western
- UK Parliament: South West Wiltshire
- Website: Parish Council

Kilmington is a village and civil parish in the extreme west of Wiltshire, England, about 8 miles (13 km) southwest of Warminster. The parish includes the hamlets of Kilmington Common and Norton Ferris.

The parish lies on the northern edge of the ancient Selwood Forest. Whitesheet Hill is in the south-east of the parish, and Long Knoll (288m above sea level) is a long ridge on the northern parish boundary. Until 1896 Kilmington was in the historic county of Somerset, as part of the Norton Ferris Hundred.

== History ==
There is much evidence of prehistoric activity on White Sheet Downs, including a Neolithic causewayed camp. Further south, straddling the parish boundary, is a large Iron Age hillfort called White Sheet Camp or White Sheet Castle, which incorporates two bowl barrows. At the Domesday survey of 1086, land in the area was part of an extensive holding (53 ploughlands) within Mere hundred.

In 1556 Kilmington was the scene of the ambush and murder of two members of the Hartgilll family on the orders of Charles Stourton, 8th Baron Stourton, for which crime he was hanged at Salisbury the following year.

== Religious sites ==
The Church of England parish church of St Mary has a 15th-century tower but the body of the church was rebuilt in 1864 and 1869; the north aisle and transept of 1868 are to designs of J. P. St Aubyn. The tower is described by Orbach as "of Somerset type", and in 1837 Rev W Phelps called it "a humble copy of the one at Bruton". It has openwork battlements and a north-east stair, and was restored in 1903 by C.E. Ponting. The church was designated as Grade II* listed in 1966.

Originally, four bells hung in the tower. There are now two, from the 17th and 18th centuries, which cannot be swung and are instead chimed with hammers. The stone font is 19th-century. Orbach dates the octagonal pulpit, richly carved in 17th-century style, to 1911 and tentatively ascribes its design to Ponting.

In 1980, Kilmington parish was added to the Upper Stour benefice, alongside the churches at Bourton (Dorset), Stourton and Zeals.

A Wesleyan Methodist chapel was built in 1847. After closure in 1972 it was sold for residential use.

== Other notable buildings ==
The rubble-stone manor house, just south of the church, probably dates from the 17th century and was altered and enlarged in the mid 19th and early 20th centuries. A two-storey porch to the north-west elevation, with arms of the Panter family and ornate bargeboards, is said by Orbach to be Edwardian. The range nearer the road has a square bellcote. The large three-storey former malt-house attached to the rear is probably from around 1800.

Kilmington House, off Butts Lane 300m north-east of the church, was the rectory until the 1940s. In rendered brick and rubble stone, it was built in 1839 and extended in 1889.

A former farmhouse at Norton Ferris, now two dwellings, is probably 18th-century.

King Alfred's Tower, a Grade I listed 18th-century monument on the Stourhead estate, is just beyond the south-west of the parish.

== Notable people ==
Francis Potter (1594–1678), a Biblical commentator and experimentalist, and an early Fellow of the Royal Society, followed his father as rector of Kilmington, and is buried in the chancel of the church.

Katherine Pleydell-Bouverie (1895–1985), a pioneering potter, worked in the malt-house behind Kilmington Manor from 1946 until her death.

Sir John Keegan (1934–2012), military historian, lecturer, writer and journalist, lived at Kilmington.

== Local government ==
The civil parish elects a parish council. It is in the area of Wiltshire Council unitary authority.

== Amenities ==
The school at Kilmington caters for the younger pupils of Whitesheet Church of England Primary Academy, while older children attend the school at Zeals. The first school at Kilmington was built circa 1830 and replaced by a new building in 1874, attended by children of all ages until 1930 when it became a junior school. The building was enlarged in 1967 and pupil numbers increased in 1968 after the closure of the school at Maiden Bradley. In 2003 Kilmington school amalgamated with Zeals, forming a two-site school.

Kilmington and Stourton Home Guard Club is a rare survivor from the 1940s.

There is a local pub, the Red Lion. Kilmington is about 2.5 miles (4.0 km) north of the Stourhead estate, where the house and gardens are owned by the National Trust.
