= Brimsdown Hill =

Hill in Wiltshire, England

Coordinates: 51.148986°N 2.249365°W

Brimsdown Hill (grid reference ST821391) is a 193.7 hectare biological Site of Special Scientific Interest in Wiltshire, notified in 1951. It is situated within the Cranborne Chase and West Wiltshire Downs Area of Outstanding Natural Beauty.

== See also ==
- Long Knoll
- Heath Hill Farm

== Sources ==
- Natural England citation sheet for the site (accessed 22 March 2022)
