= Edward Henslow =

English cricketer and British Army officer

Personal information
- Full name: Edward Lancelot Wall Henslow
- Born: 19 March 1879; Mere, Wiltshire, England
- Died: 12 March 1947 (aged 67); Salisbury, Wiltshire, England
- Batting: Unknown
- Bowling: Unknown

Domestic team information
- Years: Team
- 1914–1923: Wiltshire

Career statistics
Competition	First-class
Matches	1
Runs scored	0
Batting average	0.00
100s/50s	–/–
Top score	0
Balls bowled	42
Wickets	1
Bowling average	22.00
5 wickets in innings	–
10 wickets in match	–
Best bowling	1/22
Catches/stumpings	0/–
- Source: Cricinfo, 9 January 2019

Colonel Edward Lancelot Wall Henslow OBE, MC (19 March 1879 – 12 March 1947) was a British Army officer and one-time first-class cricketer. He served in the Duke of Edinburgh's (Wiltshire Regiment) for much of his career and was mentioned in dispatches for his service in the Second Boer War. In 1909 he served on the general staff as a gymnastics instructor, during which time he made an appearance for the British Army cricket team. Henslow served with the Wiltshire Regiment in the First World War and received the Military Cross. After the war he joined the newly formed Army Physical Training Staff and rose to become inspector of physical training in 1928. Henslow retired in 1932 but returned to service during the first part of the Second World War.

== Early life ==
Henslow was born at Mere, Wiltshire on 19 March 1879 and joined the British Army as a second lieutenant in the 3rd (Royal Wiltshire Militia) Battalion, Wiltshire Regiment on 27 October 1897. He attended Worcester College at the University of Oxford before joining the regular army in the Duke of Edinburgh's (Wiltshire Regiment) on 20 May 1899. He received promotion to lieutenant on 14 May 1900. He served with the regiment in the Second Boer War and was mentioned in dispatches by Lord Kitchener on 29 July 1902. He was promoted to captain in 1905 and seconded to the general staff on 15 April 1909 as a gymnastics instructor, a role he held until 15 April 1913. Henslow made his sole first-class cricket appearance for the British Army cricket team in 1912 against the Royal Navy at Lord's, bowling 42 balls and taking one wicket, that of Gerald Harrison. He debuted in minor counties cricket for Wiltshire in July 1914, an association he would maintain until 1923.

== First World War ==
Henslow served in the First World War. He was with the 2nd Battalion of the Wiltshire Regiment in Gibraltar in August 1914 when it was recalled to England to join the 21st Brigade. Henslow was awarded the Military Cross on 5 May 1919. He had been promoted to the temporary rank of major on 24 February 1919 when he was appointed assistant inspector of physical training. Later that year he was confirmed in the substantive rank of major, backdated to 1 September 1915.

== Inter-war and Second World War service ==
On 1 April 1922 he was appointed as a commandant (class AA) of the Army School of Physical Training at Aldershot. Henslow was appointed an Officer of the Order of the British Empire on 5 June 1926, when he was a lieutenant-colonel and commanding officer of the school. He was promoted to the rank of colonel on 8 June 1926. Henslow was appointed inspector of physical training on 1 January 1928. In 1930 he was responsible for relocating the Army Physical Training Staff's headquarters from Aldershot to the War Office in London, which allowed for closer collaboration with the Director of Military Training. He also arranged for a staff officer to be allocated to the HQ to allow for closer relations with the General Staff. Henslow retired on 1 January 1932. During the 1930s he advocated the Brotherhood Movement, an organisation that used exercise and religion to educate British youth, as a democratic alternative to the British Union of Fascists.

Henslow was recalled for service on 7 June 1939 before retiring for the last time on 30 May 1942. He died at Salisbury, Wiltshire on 12 March 1947. The Henslow Room at the Army School of Physical Training, which is now a cardiovascular fitness suite, is named after him.
