= RAF Zeals =

Former Royal Air Force station in Wiltshire, England

RAF Zeals USAAF Station AAF-450 RNAS Zeals HMS Hummingbird
- Zeals Aerodrome
- Zeals, Wiltshire in England
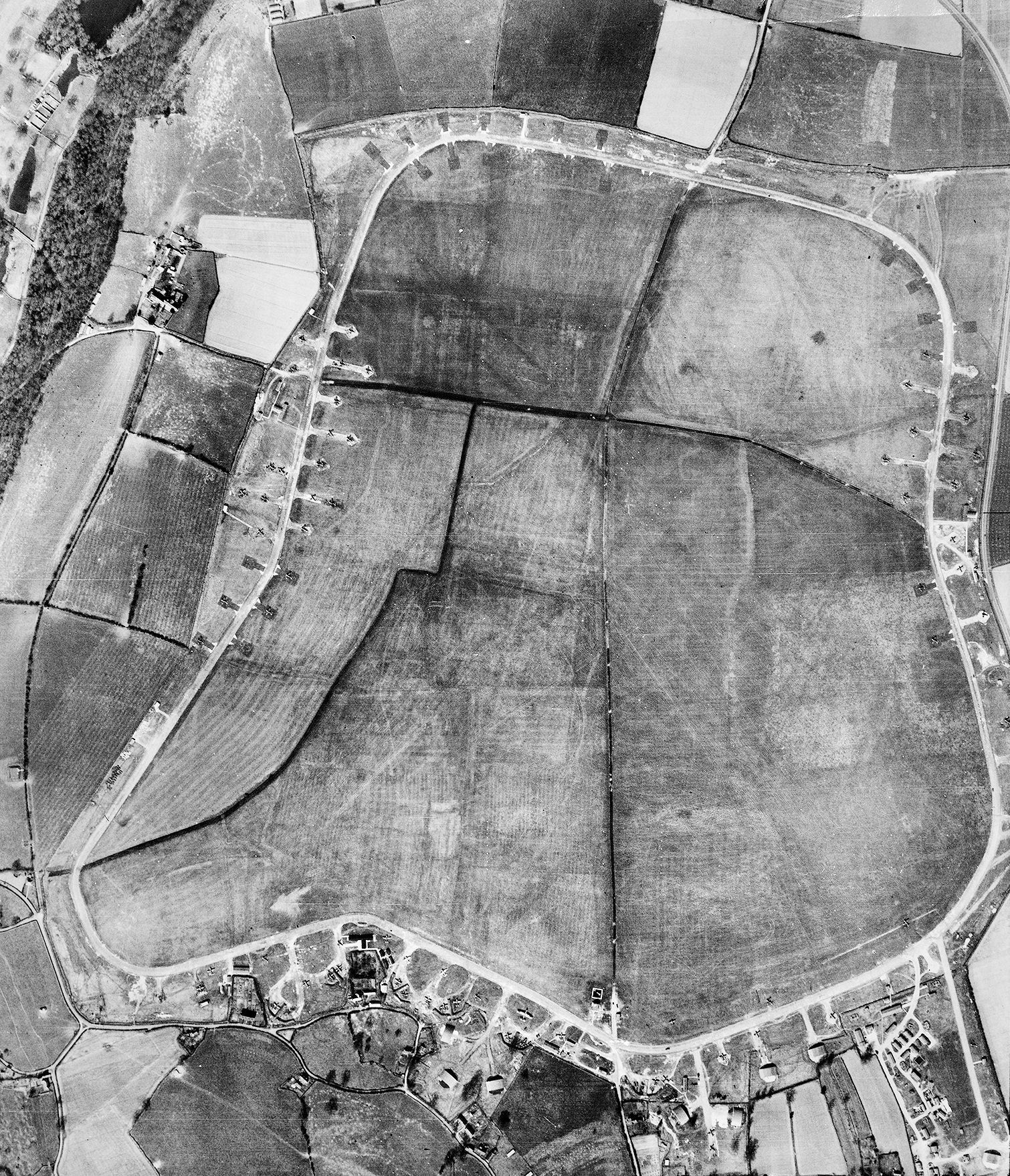
- Aerial photograph of Zeals Aerodrome: control tower, technical site and blister hangars at the bottom (south), 24 March 1944.

Site information
- Type: Royal Air Force station
- Code: ZL
- Owner: Air Ministry; Admiralty
- Operator: Royal Air Force; United States Army Air Forces 1943-44; Royal Navy
- Controlled by: RAF Fighter Command * No. 10 Group RAF; 1942-43 & 1944-45; Ninth Air Force 1943-44; Fleet Air Arm 1945-
- Condition: Disused

Location
- Shown within Wiltshire
- Coordinates: 51.093°N 2.320°W

Site history
- Built: 1941/42
- In use: May 1942 - January 1946
- Fate: Farmland / Housing
- Battles/wars: European theatre of World War II

Airfield information
- Elevation: 168 metres (551 ft) AMSL
Runways
| Direction | Length and surface |
|---|---|
| 00/00 | Grass |
| 00/00 | Grass |
| 00/00 | Grass |

Royal Air Force Zeals, or more simply RAF Zeals, is a former Royal Air Force station in Wiltshire, sited to the north of the village of Zeals, next to the village of Stourton and the Stourhead estate.

== History ==
The station was in operation from 1942 to 1946, and was successively occupied by the Royal Air Force, the United States Army Air Forces and the Royal Navy.

From opening until August 1943 the site was used by the RAF as an airfield for Hawker Hurricane and Supermarine Spitfire fighters.

Units:

- No. 66 Squadron RAF between 24 August and 23 December 1942 with the Spitfire VB & VC
- No. 118 Squadron RAF between 24 August and 23 December 1942 with the Spitfire VB
- No. 132 (City of Bombay) Squadron RAF between 28 February and 5 April 1943 with the Spitfire VB
- No. 174 (Mauritius) Squadron RAF between 12 March and 5 April 1943 with the Hurricane IIB
- No. 184 Squadron RAF between 12 March and 5 April 1943 with the Hurricane IID
- No. 263 (Fellowship of the Bellows) Squadron RAF between 19 June and 12 July 1943 with the Westland Whirlwind I
- No. 421 Squadron RCAF between 1 and 14 November 1942 with the Spitfire VB

In August 1943 it was transferred to the United States Army Air Force with the intention of using the airfield for maintenance of Douglas C-47 Skytrain transport aircraft. However, the damp conditions prevented the operation of heavy aircraft, so Republic P-47 Thunderbolt fighters were flown from Zeals instead.

From March 1944, it returned to the RAF who used it as a fighter airfield for de Havilland Mosquito fighters against German bombers.

Units:

- No. 286 Squadron RAF initially between 26 May and 31 May 1942 then between 28 July and 28 September 1944 with the Hurricane IIc and Miles Martinet
- No. 149 (Long Range Fighter) Wing RAF between 29 June and 28 July 1944
  - No. 410 Squadron RCAF between 18 June and 28 July 1944 with the Mosquito XIII
  - No. 488 Squadron RNZAF between 12 May and 29 July 1944 with the Mosquito XIII
- No. 604 (County of Middlesex) Squadron AAF between 25 and 28 July 1944 with the Mosquito XIII

Following D-Day, the RAF used the airfield for military glider training in preparation for action against Japan. In April 1945 the station was taken over by the Royal Navy (as HMS Hummingbird or RNAS Zeals) who used the airfield for aircraft carrier training.

Units:

- 771 Naval Air Squadron as a Fleet Requirements Unit between 25 July and 12 September 1945 with the Wildcat IV
- 704 Naval Air Squadron as a Naval Operational Training Unit between 11 April and 4 September 1945 with the Mosquito FB.6
- 759 Naval Air Squadron as an Advanced Flying School between 19 September 1945 and 7 January 1946 with the Corsair III
- 760 Naval Air Squadron as a Corsair Familiarization Unit between 10 April and 12 September 1945 with the Corsair III
- 790 Naval Air Squadron between 1 April and 30 August 1945 with the Firefly I and Oxford I

The airfield was closed down from January 1946 and in June it was returned to farmland. The control tower, now a private house, remains on Bells Lane in Zeals.

== Dakota crash – 19 February 1945 ==
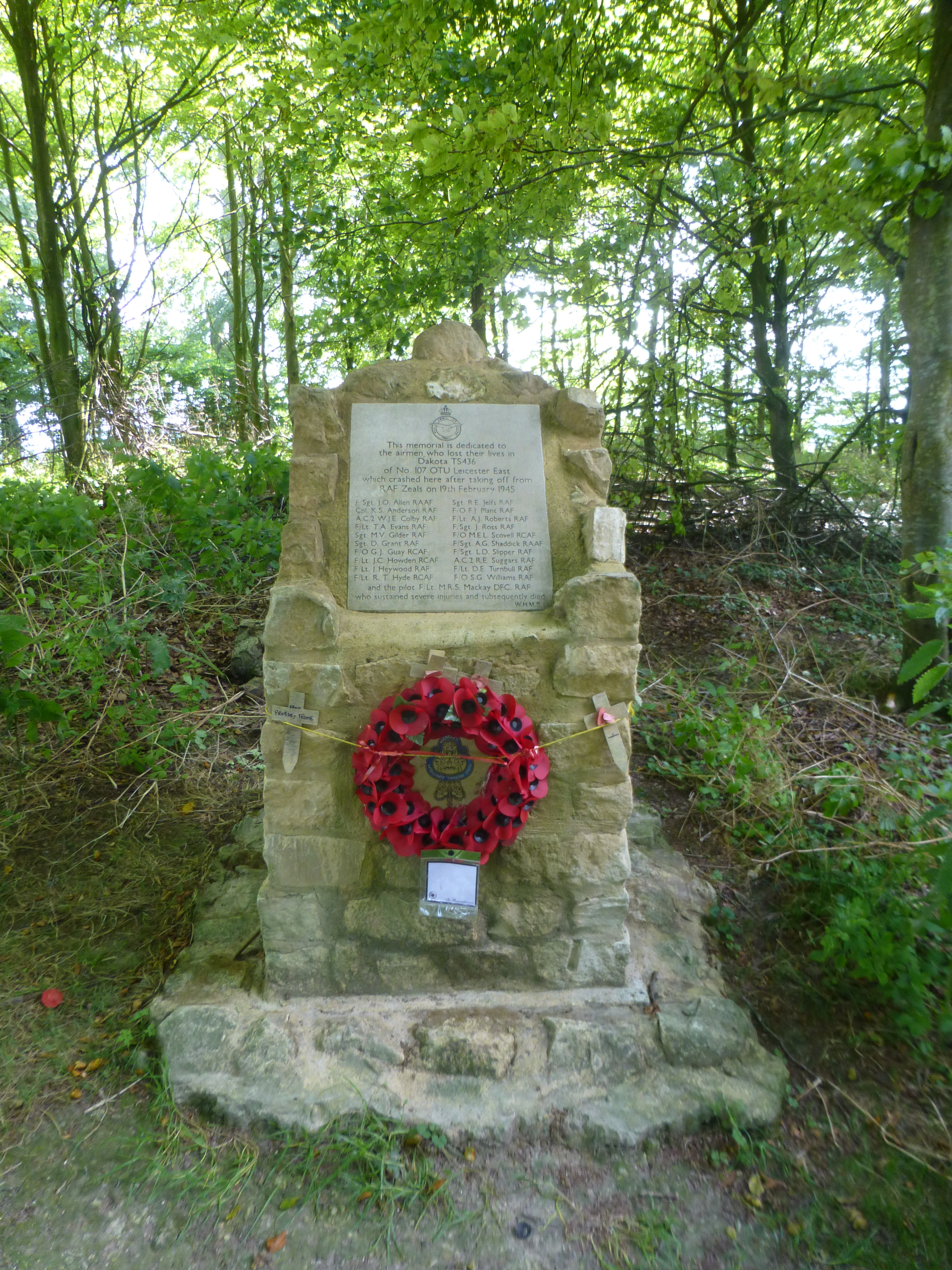
Memorial at the crash site of Dakota III TS436, crashed 19 February 1945

A Douglas Dakota III crashed on 19 February 1945, killing more than twenty people. The aircraft had taken off from Zeals airfield to return to Lincolnshire after two weeks of glider training and flew into some cloud-covered beech trees on a knoll.

The site of the crash is marked by a memorial which was erected by the Wiltshire Historical Military Society.

== Units ==
- Detachment of No. 3 Glider Training School RAF (1944)
- No. 122 Airfield Headquarters RAF between 15 and 24 February 1943
- No. 147 Airfield Headquarters RAF between 1 and 12 May 1944 became No. 147 (Night Fighter) Wing RAF between 12 May and 18 June 1944
- No. 2750 Squadron RAF Regiment
- No. 2835 Squadron RAF Regiment
- No. 2885 Squadron RAF Regiment
- No. 3205 Servicing Commando
- No. 3207 Servicing Commando
- No. 3209 Servicing Commando
- No. 3210 Servicing Commando
- No. 4018 Anti-Aircraft Flight RAF Regiment
- Glider Pick-up Training Flight RAF between 8 January and 19 March 1945 with the Douglas Dakota and Waco Hadrian gliders
- No. 925/926 (Balloon) Squadron
- No. 949 (Balloon) Squadron
- No. 966 (Balloon) Squadron

== See also ==
- List of former Royal Air Force stations
