= Henry Hoare (banker) =

English banker, died 1725

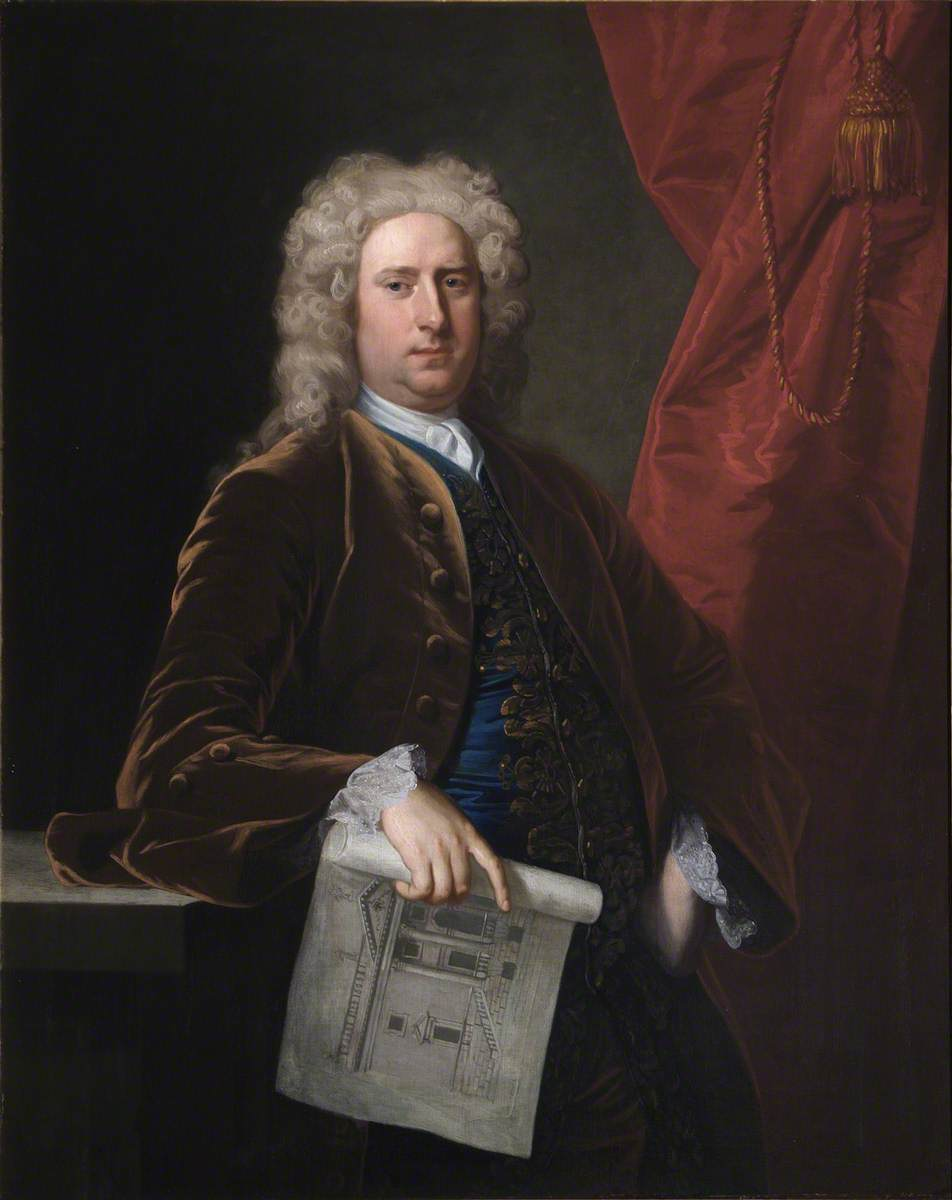
Henry Hoare by Michael Dahl

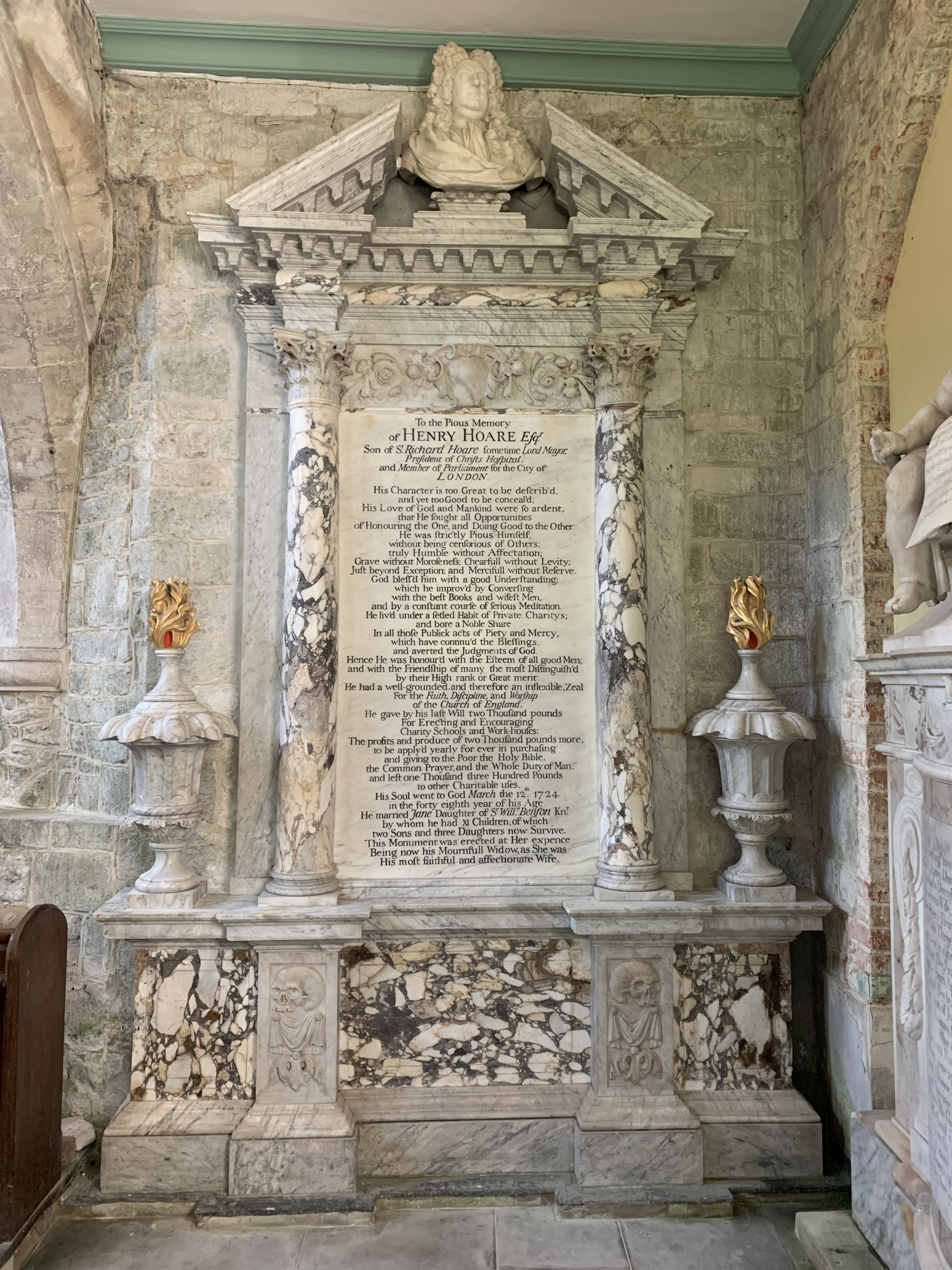
Memorial in St Peter's Church, Stourton

Henry Hoare I (1677–1725), known as Good Henry, was an English banker and landowner.

== Career ==
Born the son of Sir Richard Hoare, founder of C. Hoare & Co bankers, Henry the Good became a Partner in the bank in August 1702. Together with his father, he became a commissioner for the building of 50 new churches in London in 1711. Following his father's death in 1719, he managed the bank through the South Sea Bubble of 1720, making a profit of over £28,000 from the crisis. He acquired the Stourhead estate in 1717 but died before the new house there had been fully completed.

In 1702 he married Jane Benson; they had three children:

- Jane (d.1762)
- Henry Hoare II (1705–1785)
- Sir Richard Hoare (1709–1754), Lord Mayor of London 1745–46
