= Mere, Wiltshire =

Market town in Wiltshire, England

Coordinates: 51.090°N 2.266°W

Mere
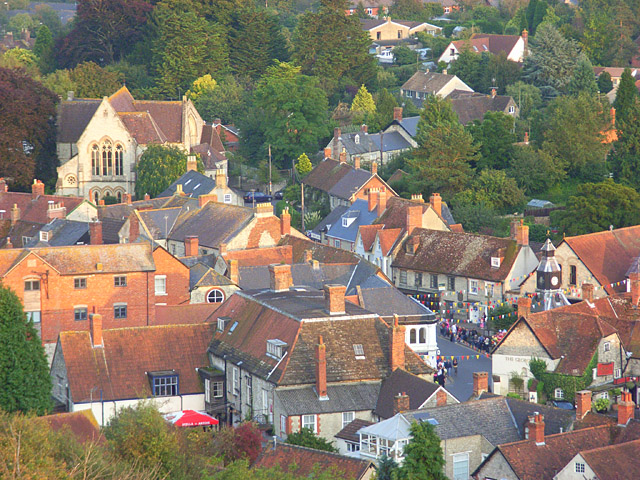

- Location within Wiltshire
- Population: 2,807 (in 2021)
- OS grid reference: ST812322
- Civil parish: Mere
- Unitary authority: Wiltshire
- Ceremonial county: Wiltshire
- Region: South West
- Country: England
- Sovereign state: United Kingdom
- Post town: WARMINSTER
- Postcode district: BA12
- Dialling code: 01747
- Police: Wiltshire
- Fire: Dorset and Wiltshire
- Ambulance: South Western
- UK Parliament: South West Wiltshire
- Website: Town Council

Mere is a market town and civil parish in Wiltshire, England. It lies at the extreme southwestern tip of Salisbury Plain, close to the borders of Somerset and Dorset. The parish includes the hamlets of Barrow Street, Burton, Charnage, Limpers Hill, Rook Street and Southbrook.

The A303 trunk road passed through Mere until a bypass was built on the northern edge of the town in 1976. There is an old market square (although markets have not been held for several years), a chiming town clock and a large Grade I listed parish church. The steep slope of Castle Hill rises from the northwestern side of the town.

== History ==
Evidence of prehistoric activity in the area is provided by bowl barrows, including four on Long Hill, overlooking the town. On the northwestern boundary of the parish is Whitesheet Hill, with barrows and an Iron Age hill fort, White Sheet camp. A burial dating from either the 7th or 8th has been found in the town.

The name Mere may reflect the presence of a mere, a pond or small lake; or it may derive from the Old English mǣre meaning 'boundary' as the town is near the tripoint of Wiltshire, Somerset and Dorset.

Mere had a church from the end of the 12th century. The Earl of Cornwall built Mere Castle on a hill which is connected to Long Hill, overlooking the town, in the mid-13th century. The castle was abandoned in the 14th century and today only earthworks remain. The Duchy of Cornwall still owns much land in the area.

Mere Down, north of the town, has medieval strip lynchets.

== Governance ==
The civil parish elects a town council. It is in the area of Wiltshire Council unitary authority, which performs most significant local government functions.

An electoral ward with the same name exists. The ward starts in the east at West Knoyle, stretches through Mere, continues to Zeals and finishes in the northwest at Kilmington. The population of the ward taken from the 2011 census was 4,285.

== Religious sites ==
=== Parish church ===
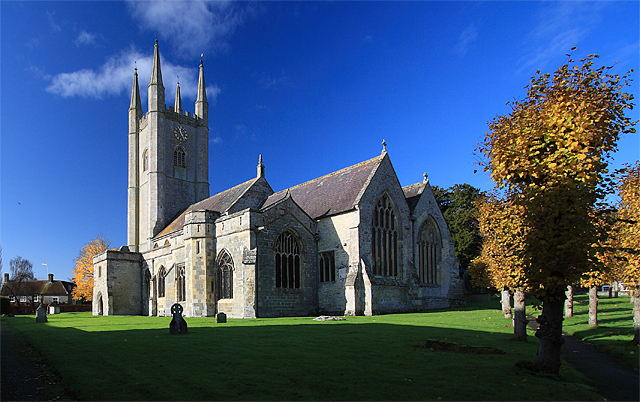
St Michael's Church

The Anglican church of St Michael the Archangel is from the 13th, 14th and 15th centuries, and contains remnants from an earlier building. Pevsner describes the church and its furnishings in considerable detail. The church has a 124-foot (38-metre) tower with eight bells and is unusual in that it has 10 misericords; those on the south side of the choir date from the 15th century, whilst those on the north side are early 20th century. Restoration in 1856 was by T.H. Wyatt. In 1966 the church was designated as Grade I listed.

The benefice was combined with West Knoyle in 1929, and Maiden Bradley in 1976, forming the parish of Mere with West Knoyle and Maiden Bradley.

=== Others ===
Mere Methodist Church was built as a Primitive Methodist chapel in 1846; a gallery was added in 1859 and a schoolroom in 1874. It was de-consecrated in 2017 and sold at auction in April 2018. It has been converted for residential use.

Mere United Reformed Church was built in 1868 as a Congregational chapel, joining the United Reformed Church at its formation in 1972. Precursors of the present building were a small Presbyterian chapel of 1700, an Independent chapel of 1795 and a larger chapel of 1852.

The church of St Matthew was built in 1882 by C.E. Ponting, on a rural site at White Hill, 1 1/4 miles (2 kilometres) southeast of the town. It was a mission church, served by the clergy of St Michael's. The church closed in 2004 and was sold for residential use in 2008.

St Mary's Roman Catholic church was built in 1946 after the community purchased a surplus Nissen hut.

== Notable buildings ==
Woodlands Manor, 3/4 mile (1.2 kilometres) south of the town, is a Grade I listed manor house and chapel from the 14th century, which was restored to its 17th-century appearance in the 20th century.

Buildings designated as Grade II* are the Old Ship Hotel, formerly a house dated 1711, later the Ship Inn; the Chantry, a 15th-century house for chantry priests; and Dewes House, 17th century.

== Schools ==
The town has a primary school. The local secondary school is Gillingham School, Dorset, about 3 1/2 miles (5.5 kilometres) away.

The present school was opened in 1965 at a new site, on Duchy of Cornwall land, as Duchy Manor Secondary School. Accommodation for younger children was added on the same site in 1992 and in 2004 the whole premises became the primary school. Earlier schools were, firstly, the British School, founded c. 1830 and from 1852 housed in the schoolroom under the new Congregational chapel, later taking over the whole building when the larger adjacent chapel was built in 1868. Secondly, the National School, opened near St Michael's in 1840, extended 1864, and augmented in 1899 by the adjacent Grove Building which was funded by Miss Julia Chafyn Grove of Zeals House. The schools amalgamated in 1922 and continued on the same sites as Mere First School (until 1992) and Mere Senior School, later Junior School (until 1972).

== Media ==
Local news and television programmes are provided by BBC West and ITV West Country. Television signals are received from the Mendip TV transmitter. Local radio stations are BBC Radio Wiltshire, BBC Radio Solent can also be heard in the town, Heart West, Vale FM, and Alfred Radio, a community based station which broadcast from Shaftesbury. The town is served by the local newspapers, Warminster Journal and Wiltshire Times.

== Economy and amenities ==
The Hillbrush company was established in Mere in 1922, and continues to make brushes and other forms of cleaning equipment in a modern factory on the western edge of the town.

The town's library and museum are housed in the 1839 National School building, which was converted in 1970.

The Monarch's Way long-distance recreational footpath passes through the town. The town is part of the West Country Carnival circuit.

The nearest railway station is in neighbouring Gillingham, Dorset, on the Exeter to Waterloo line.

== Notable people ==
- Sir Harrison Birtwistle (1934–2022), composer
- Edward Henslow (1879–1947), British Army officer and first-class cricketer
- Lot Long (sometimes Longyear) (1823–1893), thatcher, whose photograph is on the cover of Led Zeppelin's Led Zeppelin IV
- Sir Rowland Sperling (1874–1965), diplomat and ambassador
