= Vivien Leigh =

British actress (1913–1967)

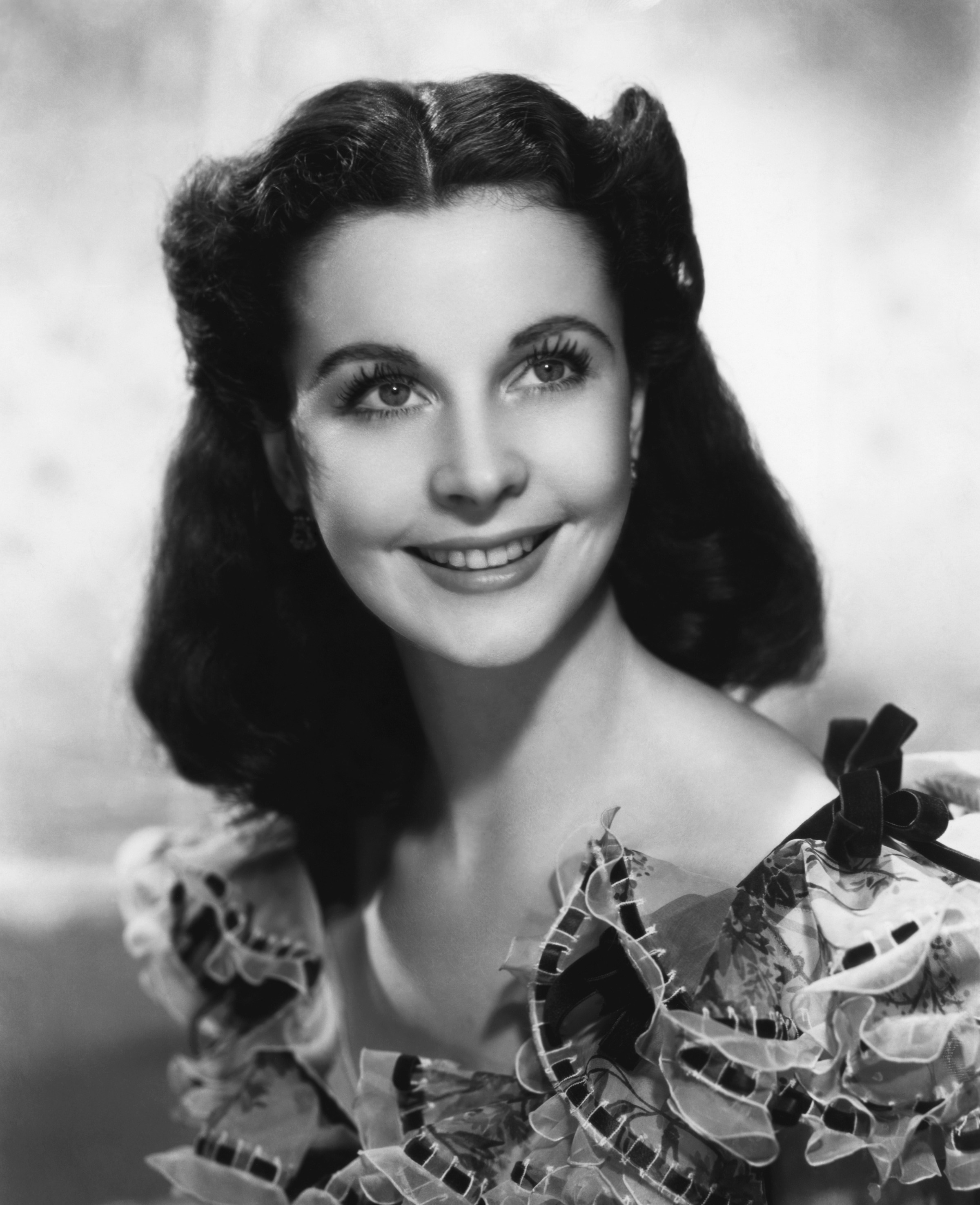
- Leigh in Gone with the Wind (1939)
- Born: Vivian Mary Hartley; 5 November 1913; Darjeeling, Bengal Presidency, British India
- Died: 8 July 1967 (aged 53); London, England
- Occupation: Actress
- Years active: 1935–1967
- Title: Lady Olivier (1947–1960); Vivien, Lady Olivier (1960–1967)
- Spouses: Herbert Leigh Holman (m. 1932; div. 1940); Laurence Olivier (m. 1940; div. 1960)
- Partner: John Merivale (1960–1967)
- Children: Suzanne Farrington
- Relatives: Gerald Fielding (first cousin); Xan Fielding (first cousin once removed)
- Awards: Academy Award for Best Actress

Vivian Mary Olivier (née Hartley; 5 November 1913 – 8 July 1967), known professionally as Vivien Leigh (/liː/ LEE) and styled as Lady Olivier after 1947, was a British actress. After completing her drama school education, Leigh performed on stage before receiving small roles in four films in 1935, eventually progressing to the role of heroine in Fire Over England (1937). She went on to win the Academy Award for Best Actress twice, for her performances as Scarlett O'Hara in Gone with the Wind (1939) and Blanche DuBois in the film adaptation of A Streetcar Named Desire (1951), a role she had played on stage in London's West End in 1949. For the latter role, she also won the Volpi Cup for Best Actress, and later won a Tony Award for her work in the Broadway musical version of Tovarich (1963).

Despite her fame as a screen actress, Leigh was primarily a stage performer. During her 30-year career, she played roles ranging from the heroines of Noël Coward and George Bernard Shaw comedies to classic Shakespearean characters such as Ophelia, Cleopatra, Juliet and Lady Macbeth. Later in life, she performed as a character actress in a few films. Although her career had periods of inactivity, in 1999 the American Film Institute (AFI) ranked Leigh as the 16th-greatest female movie star of classic Hollywood cinema. Widely lauded for her beauty, Leigh felt that her physical attributes sometimes prevented her from being taken seriously as an actress.

At the time, the public strongly identified Leigh with her second husband, Laurence Olivier, who was her spouse from 1940 to 1960. Leigh and Olivier starred together in many stage productions, with Olivier often directing, and in three films. She earned a reputation for being difficult to work with, and for much of her life she had recurrent bouts of chronic tuberculosis, which was first diagnosed in the mid-1940s and ultimately led to her death at age 53.

== Life and career ==
=== 1913–1934: Early life and acting debut ===
Leigh was born Vivian Mary Hartley on 5 November 1913 in British India in Darjeeling, Bengal Presidency. She was the only child of Ernest Richard Hartley, a British broker, and his wife, Gertrude Mary Frances (née Yackjee; she also used her mother's maiden name of Robinson). Her father was born in Scotland in 1882, while her mother, a devout Catholic, was born in Darjeeling in 1888 and of Armenian and Irish ancestry. Gertrude's parents, who lived in India, were Michael John Yackjee, who was born to an Armenian family that moved to India in 1843 and worked as a clerk for the East India Railway, and Mary Teresa Robinson, who was born to an Irish family killed during the Indian Rebellion of 1857 and grew up in an orphanage, where she met Yackjee; they married in 1872 and had five children, of whom Gertrude was the youngest. Ernest and Gertrude Hartley were married in 1912 in Kensington, London.

In 1917, Ernest Hartley was transferred to Bangalore as an officer in the Indian Cavalry, while Gertrude and Vivian stayed in Ootacamund. At the age of three, Vivian made her first stage appearance for her mother's amateur theatre group, reciting "Little Bo Peep". Gertrude Hartley tried to instill an appreciation of literature in her daughter and introduced her to the works of Hans Christian Andersen, Lewis Carroll and Rudyard Kipling, as well as stories of Greek mythology and Indian folklore. At the age of six, Vivian was sent by her mother from Loreto Convent, Darjeeling, to the Convent of the Sacred Heart (now Woldingham School) then situated in Roehampton, Middlesex. One of her school friends there was future actress Maureen O'Sullivan to whom Vivian expressed her desire to become "a great actress". She was removed from the school by her father, and travelling with her parents for four years, she attended schools in Europe, notably in Dinard (Brittany, France), Biarritz (France), the Sacred Heart in Sanremo on the Italian Riviera, and in Paris, becoming fluent in both French and Italian. The family returned to Britain in 1931. She attended A Connecticut Yankee, one of O'Sullivan's films playing in London's West End, and told her parents of her ambitions to become an actress. Shortly after, her father enrolled Vivian at the Royal Academy of Dramatic Art (RADA) in London.

l to r: Laurence Olivier, Suzanne Farrington, Vivian Leigh (1950s studio photo)

Vivian met Herbert Leigh Holman, known as Leigh Holman, a barrister, in 1931. Despite his disapproval of "theatrical people", they married on 20 December 1932 and she terminated her studies at RADA, her attendance and interest in acting having already waned after meeting Holman. On 12 October 1933 in London, she gave birth to a daughter, Suzanne Holman, later Suzanne Farrington. (Note: Holman was granted custody of their child after their divorce. Leigh became a grandmother in 1958, when Suzanne had her first child.)

=== 1935–1939: Early career and Laurence Olivier ===
Leigh's friends suggested she take a minor role as a schoolgirl in the film Things Are Looking Up, which was her film debut, albeit uncredited as an extra. She engaged an agent, John Gliddon, who believed that "Vivian Holman" was not a suitable name for an actress. After rejecting his many suggestions, she took "Vivian Leigh" as her professional name. (Note: For stage names, Gliddon proposed "Susan" then "Suzanne Hartley" and "Mary Hartley", before the more outlandish "April Morn" and "April Maugham".) Gliddon recommended her to Alexander Korda as a possible film actress, but Korda rejected her as lacking potential. She was cast in the play The Mask of Virtue, directed by Sydney Carroll in 1935, and received excellent reviews, followed by interviews and newspaper articles. One such article was from the Daily Express, in which the interviewer noted that "a lightning change came over her face", which was the first public mention of the rapid changes in mood that had become characteristic of her. John Betjeman, future poet laureate, described her as "the essence of English girlhood". Korda attended her opening night performance, admitted his error, and signed her to a film contract. She continued with the play but, when Korda moved it to a larger theatre, Leigh was found to be unable to project her voice adequately or to hold the attention of so large an audience, and the play closed soon after. In the playbill, Carroll had revised the spelling of her first name to "Vivien".

In 1960, Leigh recalled her ambivalence towards her first experience of critical acclaim and sudden fame, commenting that "some critics saw fit to be as foolish as to say that I was a great actress. And I thought, that was a foolish, wicked thing to say, because it put such an onus and such a responsibility onto me, which I simply wasn't able to carry. And it took me years to learn enough to live up to what they said for those first notices. I find it so stupid. I remember the critic very well and have never forgiven him."

In the autumn of 1935 and at Leigh's insistence, John Buckmaster introduced her to Laurence Olivier at the Savoy Grill, where he and his first wife Jill Esmond dined regularly after his performance in Romeo and Juliet. Olivier had seen Leigh in The Mask of Virtue earlier in May and congratulated her on her performance. Olivier and Leigh began an affair while acting as lovers in Fire Over England (1937), while Olivier was still married to Esmond and Leigh to Holman. During this period, Leigh read the Margaret Mitchell novel Gone with the Wind and instructed her American agent to recommend her to David O. Selznick, who was planning a film version. She remarked to a journalist, "I've cast myself as Scarlett O'Hara", and The Observer film critic C. A. Lejeune recalled a conversation of the same period in which Leigh "stunned us all" with the assertion that Olivier "won't play Rhett Butler, but I shall play Scarlett O'Hara. Wait and see."

Despite her relative inexperience, Leigh was chosen to play Ophelia to Olivier's Hamlet in an Old Vic Theatre production staged at Elsinore, Denmark. Olivier and Leigh later began living together, as their respective spouses had each refused to grant either of them a divorce. Under the moral standards then enforced by the film industry, their relationship had to be kept from public view.

Leigh appeared with Robert Taylor, Lionel Barrymore and Maureen O'Sullivan in A Yank at Oxford (1938), which was the first of her films to receive attention in the United States. During production, she developed a reputation for being difficult and unreasonable, partly because she disliked her secondary role but mainly because her petulant antics seemed to be paying dividends. After dealing with the threat of a lawsuit brought over a frivolous incident, Korda instructed her agent to warn her that her option would not be renewed if her behaviour did not improve. Her next role was in Sidewalks of London, also known as St. Martin's Lane (1938), with Charles Laughton.

Olivier had been attempting to broaden his film career. He was not well known in the United States despite his success in Britain, and earlier attempts to introduce him to American audiences had failed. Having been offered the role of Heathcliff in Samuel Goldwyn's production of Wuthering Heights (1939), Olivier travelled to Hollywood, leaving Leigh in London. Goldwyn and the film's director, William Wyler, offered Leigh the secondary role of Isabella, but she refused, preferring the role of Cathy, which went to Merle Oberon.

=== 1939: Gone with the Wind ===
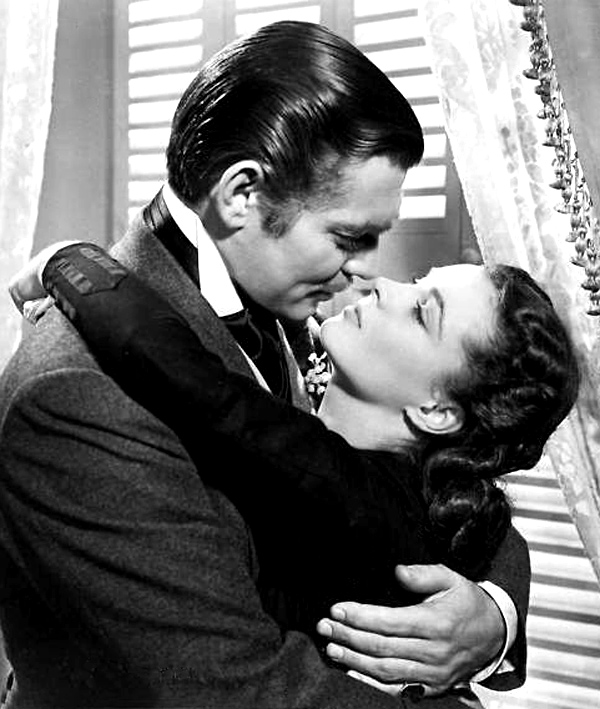
Clark Gable and Leigh in a publicity photo for Gone with the Wind (1939).

Hollywood was in the midst of a widely publicised search to find an actress to portray Scarlett O'Hara in David O. Selznick's production of Gone with the Wind (1939). At the time, Myron Selznick—David's brother and Leigh's American theatrical agent—was the London representative of the Myron Selznick Agency. In February 1938, Leigh asked Myron that she be considered to play the part of Scarlett O'Hara.

David O. Selznick watched her performances that month in Fire Over England and A Yank at Oxford and thought that she was excellent but in no way a possible Scarlett because she was "too British". Leigh travelled to Los Angeles, however, to be with Olivier and to try to convince David Selznick that she was the right person for the part. Myron Selznick also represented Olivier and when he met Leigh, he felt that she possessed the qualities that his brother was searching for. According to legend, Myron Selznick took Leigh and Olivier to the set where the burning of the Atlanta Depot scene was being filmed and stage-managed an encounter, where he introduced Leigh, derisively addressing his younger brother, "Hey, genius, meet your Scarlett O'Hara." The following day, Leigh read a scene for Selznick, who organized a screen test with director George Cukor and wrote to his wife, "She's the Scarlett dark horse and looks damn good. Not for anyone's ear but your own: it's narrowed down to Paulette Goddard, Jean Arthur, Joan Bennett and Vivien Leigh". The director, George Cukor, concurred and praised Leigh's "incredible wildness". She secured the role of Scarlett soon after.

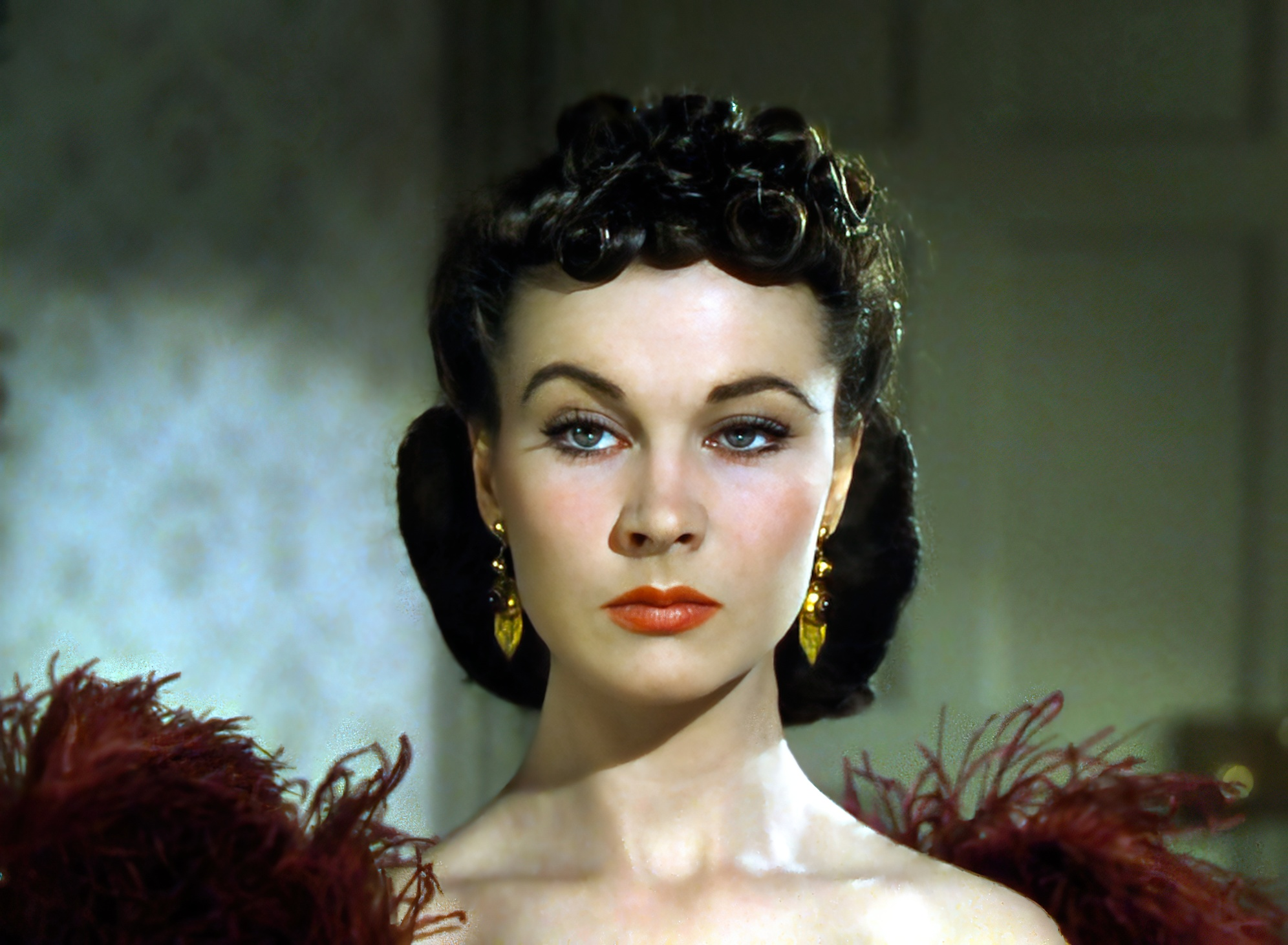
Leigh's portrayal of Scarlett O'Hara

Filming proved difficult for Leigh. Cukor was dismissed and replaced by Victor Fleming, with whom Leigh frequently quarrelled. She and Olivia de Havilland secretly met with Cukor at night and on weekends for his advice about how they should play their parts. Leigh befriended Clark Gable, his wife Carole Lombard and Olivia de Havilland, but she clashed with Leslie Howard, with whom she was required to play several emotional scenes. Leigh was sometimes required to work seven days a week, often late into the night, which added to her distress, and she missed Olivier, who was working in New York City. On a long-distance telephone call to Olivier, she declared: "Puss, my puss, how I hate film acting! Hate, hate, and never want to do another film again!" Quoted in a 2006 biography of Olivier, Olivia de Havilland defended Leigh against claims of her manic behaviour during the filming of Gone with the Wind: "Vivien was impeccably professional, impeccably disciplined on Gone with the Wind. She had two great concerns: doing her best work in an extremely difficult role and being separated from Larry [Olivier], who was in New York."

Gone with the Wind brought Leigh immediate attention and fame, but she was quoted as saying, "I'm not a film star—I'm an actress. Being a film star—just a film star—is such a false life, lived for fake values and for publicity. Actresses go on for a long time and there are always marvellous parts to play." The film won ten Academy Awards, including Best Actress for Leigh, who also won the New York Film Critics Circle Award for Best Actress.

=== 1940–1949: Marriage and early collaborations with Olivier ===
In February 1940, Jill Esmond agreed to divorce Laurence Olivier, and Leigh Holman agreed to divorce Vivien, although they maintained a strong friendship for the rest of Leigh's life. Esmond was granted custody of Tarquin, her son with Olivier. Holman was granted custody of Suzanne, his daughter with Leigh. On 31 August 1940, Olivier and Leigh were married at the San Ysidro Ranch in Santa Barbara, California, in a ceremony attended only by their hosts, Ronald and Benita Colman and witnesses, Katharine Hepburn and Garson Kanin. Leigh had made a screen test and hoped to co-star with Olivier in Rebecca, which was to be directed by Alfred Hitchcock with Olivier in the leading role. After viewing Leigh's screen test, David Selznick noted that "she doesn't seem right as to sincerity or age or innocence", a view shared by Hitchcock and Leigh's mentor, George Cukor.

Selznick observed that she had shown no enthusiasm for the part until Olivier had been confirmed as the lead actor, so he cast Joan Fontaine. He refused to allow her to join Olivier in Pride and Prejudice (1940), and Greer Garson played the role Leigh had wanted for herself. Waterloo Bridge (1940) was to have starred Olivier and Leigh; however, Selznick replaced Olivier with Robert Taylor, then at the peak of his success as one of Metro-Goldwyn-Mayer's most popular male stars. Her top billing reflected her status in Hollywood, and the film was popular with audiences and critics.

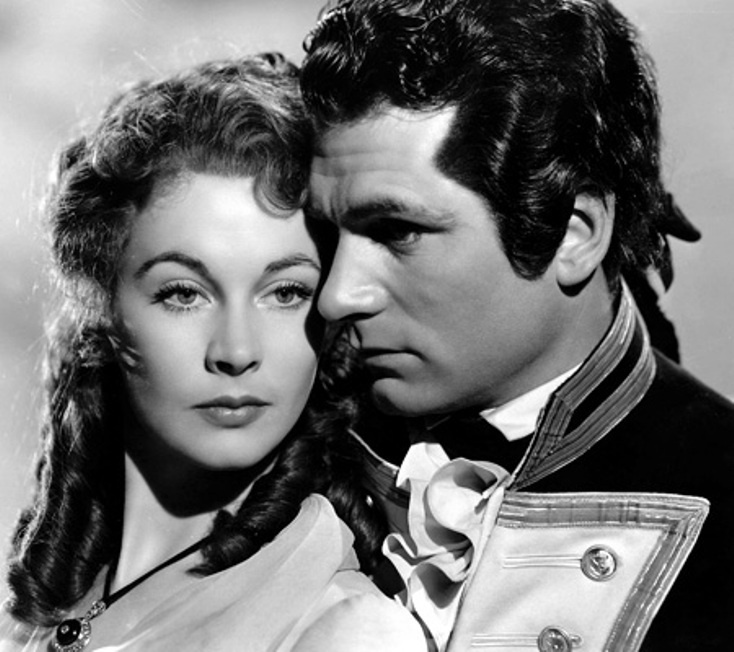
Leigh and Laurence Olivier in That Hamilton Woman (1941)

The Oliviers mounted a stage production of Romeo and Juliet for Broadway. The New York press publicised the adulterous nature of the beginning of Olivier and Leigh's relationship and questioned their ethics in not returning to the UK to help with the war effort. After Olivier enrolled in the Fleet Air Arm, he served for two years as a pilot, resigning his commission in 1943 as a lieutenant-commander. Ultimately, Ralph Richardson and others dissuaded him, convincing Olivier that his contribution to the war effort should be on stage and in film. Critics were hostile in their assessment of Romeo and Juliet. Brooks Atkinson for The New York Times wrote: "Although Miss Leigh and Mr. Olivier are handsome young people, they hardly act their parts at all." While most of the blame was attributed to Olivier's acting and direction, Leigh was also criticised, with Bernard Grebanier commenting on the "thin, shopgirl quality of Miss Leigh's voice". The couple had invested almost all of their combined savings of $40,000 (equivalent to $920,000 in 2025) in the project, and the failure was a financial disaster for them.

The Oliviers filmed That Hamilton Woman (1941) with Olivier as Horatio Nelson and Leigh as Emma Hamilton. With the United States not yet having entered the war, it was one of several Hollywood films made with the aim of arousing a pro-British sentiment among American audiences. The film was popular in the United States and an outstanding success in the Soviet Union. Winston Churchill arranged a screening for a party that included Franklin D. Roosevelt and, on its conclusion, addressed the group, saying, "Gentlemen, I thought this film would interest you, showing great events similar to those in which you have just been taking part." The Oliviers remained favourites of Churchill, attending dinners and occasions at his request for the rest of his life; and, of Leigh, he was quoted as saying, "By Jove, she's a clinker."

The Oliviers returned to Britain in January 1941, and Leigh toured through North Africa in 1943 as part of a revue for the armed forces stationed in the region. She reportedly turned down a studio contract worth $5,000 a week (equivalent to $93,000 in 2025) in order to volunteer as part of the war effort. Leigh performed for troops before falling ill with a persistent cough and fevers. In 1944, she was diagnosed as having tuberculosis in her left lung and spent several weeks in hospital before appearing to have recovered. Leigh was filming Caesar and Cleopatra (1945) when she discovered she was pregnant, then had a miscarriage. Leigh temporarily fell into a deep depression that hit its low point with her falling to the floor, sobbing in a hysterical fit. This was the first of many major bipolar disorder breakdowns. Olivier later came to recognise the symptoms of an impending episode—several days of hyperactivity followed by a period of depression and an explosive breakdown, after which Leigh would have no memory of the event, but would be acutely embarrassed and remorseful.

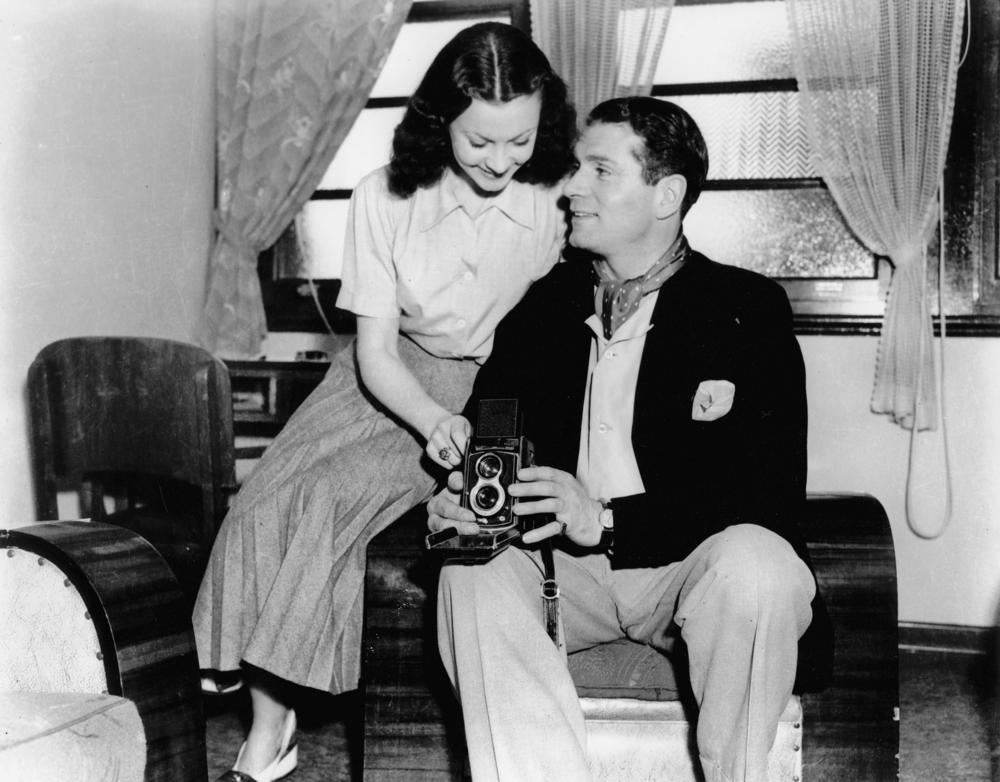
Leigh and Olivier in Australia, June 1948

With her doctor's approval, Leigh was well enough to resume acting in 1946, starring in a successful London production of Thornton Wilder's The Skin of Our Teeth; but her films of this period, Caesar and Cleopatra (1945) and Anna Karenina (1948), were not great commercial successes. All British films in this period were adversely affected by a Hollywood boycott of British films. In 1947, Olivier was knighted and Leigh accompanied him to Buckingham Palace for the investiture. She became Lady Olivier.

By 1948, Olivier was on the board of directors for the Old Vic Theatre, and he and Leigh embarked on a six-month tour of Australia and New Zealand to raise funds for the theatre. Olivier played the lead in Richard III and also performed with Leigh in The School for Scandal and The Skin of Our Teeth. The tour was an outstanding success and, although Leigh was plagued with insomnia and allowed her understudy to replace her for a week while she was ill, she generally withstood the demands placed upon her, with Olivier noting her ability to "charm the press". Members of the company later recalled several quarrels between the couple as Olivier was increasingly resentful of the demands placed on him during the tour. The most dramatic altercation occurred in Christchurch, New Zealand, when her shoes were not found and Leigh refused to go onstage without them. Olivier screamed an obscenity at her and slapped her face, and a devastated Leigh slapped him in return, dismayed that he would hit her publicly. Subsequently, she made her way to the stage in borrowed pumps, and in seconds, had "dried her tears and smiled brightly onstage". By the end of the tour, both were exhausted and ill. Olivier told a journalist, "You may not know it, but you are talking to a couple of walking corpses." Later, he would observe that he "lost Vivien" in Australia. The success of the tour encouraged the Oliviers to make their first West End appearance together, performing the same works with one addition, Antigone, included at Leigh's insistence because she wished to play a role in a tragedy.

=== 1949–1951: Play and film roles in A Streetcar Named Desire ===
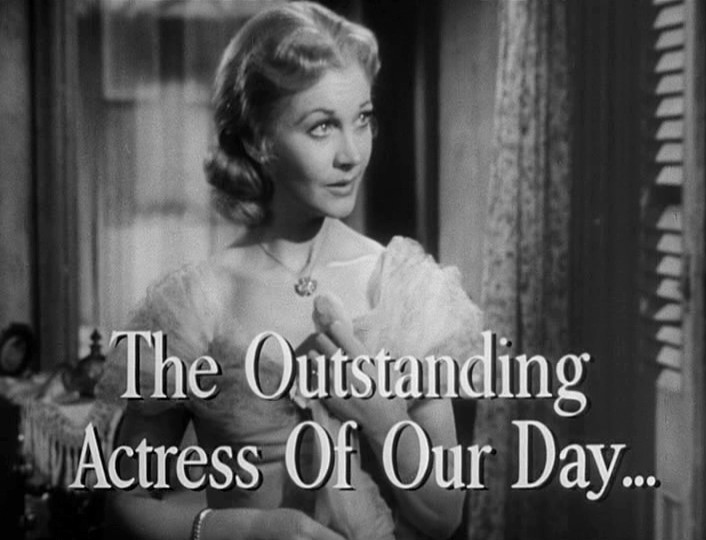
As Blanche DuBois in the trailer for A Streetcar Named Desire (1951)

Leigh next sought the role of Blanche DuBois in the West End stage production of Tennessee Williams's A Streetcar Named Desire and was cast after Williams and the play's producer Irene Mayer Selznick saw her in The School for Scandal and Antigone; Olivier was contracted to direct. The play contained a rape scene and references to promiscuity and homosexuality, and was destined to be controversial; the media discussion about its suitability added to Leigh's anxiety. Nevertheless, she believed strongly in the importance of the work.

When the West End production of Streetcar opened in October 1949, J. B. Priestley denounced the play and Leigh's performance; and the critic Kenneth Tynan, who was to make a habit of dismissing her stage performances, commented that Leigh was badly miscast because British actors were "too well-bred to emote effectively on stage". Olivier and Leigh were chagrined that part of the commercial success of the play lay in audience members attending to see what they believed would be a salacious story, rather than the Greek tragedy that they envisioned. The play also had strong supporters, among them Noël Coward, who described Leigh as "magnificent".

After 326 performances, Leigh finished her run, and she was soon assigned to reprise her role as Blanche DuBois in the film version of the play. (Note: Leigh's fee of $100,000 for A Streetcar Named Desire made her the highest paid British actress in 1951; her costar, Marlon Brando, was paid $75,000 for his role as Stanley Kowalski.) She established a rapport with Marlon Brando, but she had an initial difficulty in working with director Elia Kazan, who was displeased with the direction that Olivier had taken in shaping the character of Blanche. Kazan had favoured Jessica Tandy and later, Olivia de Havilland over Leigh, but knew she had been a success on the London stage as Blanche. He later commented that he did not hold her in high regard as an actress, believing that "she had a small talent." As work progressed, however, he became "full of admiration" for "the greatest determination to excel of any actress I've known. She'd have crawled over broken glass if she thought it would help her performance." Leigh found the role gruelling and commented to the Los Angeles Times, "I had nine months in the theatre of Blanche DuBois. Now she's in command of me." Olivier accompanied her to Hollywood where he was to co-star with Jennifer Jones in William Wyler's Carrie (1952).

Leigh's performance in A Streetcar Named Desire won glowing reviews, as well as her second Academy Award, the BAFTA Award for Best British Actress, the New York Film Critics Circle Award for Best Actress, and the Volpi Cup for Best Actress at the Venice Film Festival. Tennessee Williams commented that Leigh brought to the role "everything that I intended, and much that I had never dreamed of". Leigh herself had mixed feelings about her association with the character; in later years, she said that playing Blanche DuBois "tipped me over into madness".

=== 1951–1960: Struggle with mental illness ===
In 1951 in London, Leigh and Laurence Olivier performed two plays about Cleopatra, William Shakespeare's Antony and Cleopatra and George Bernard Shaw's Caesar and Cleopatra, alternating the play each night and winning good reviews. They took the productions to New York, where they performed a season at the Ziegfeld Theatre into 1952. The reviews there were also mostly positive, but film critic Kenneth Tynan angered them when he suggested that Leigh's was a mediocre talent that forced Olivier to compromise his own. Tynan's diatribe almost precipitated another collapse; Leigh, terrified of failure and intent on achieving greatness, dwelt on his comments and ignored the positive reviews of other critics.

In January 1953, Leigh travelled to Ceylon to film Elephant Walk with Peter Finch. Shortly after filming commenced, she had a nervous breakdown and Paramount Pictures replaced her with Elizabeth Taylor. Olivier returned her to their home in Britain, where, between periods of incoherence, Leigh told her husband she was in love with Finch and had been having an affair with him. Over a period of several months, she gradually recovered. As a result of this episode, many of the Oliviers' friends learned of her problems. David Niven said she had been "quite, quite mad". Noël Coward expressed surprise in his diary that "things had been bad and getting worse since 1948 or thereabouts". Leigh's romantic relationship with Finch began in 1948, and waxed and waned for several years, ultimately flickering out as her mental condition deteriorated.

Also in 1953, Leigh recovered sufficiently to play The Sleeping Prince with Olivier, and in 1955 they performed a season at Stratford-upon-Avon in Shakespeare's Twelfth Night, Macbeth and Titus Andronicus. They played to capacity houses and attracted generally good reviews, with Leigh's health seemingly stable. John Gielgud directed Twelfth Night and wrote, "... perhaps I will still make a good thing of that divine play, especially if he will let me pull her little ladyship (who is brainier than he but not a born actress) out of her timidity and safeness. He dares too confidently ... but she hardly dares at all and is terrified of overreaching her technique and doing anything that she has not killed the spontaneity of by over-practice." In 1955, Leigh starred in Anatole Litvak's film The Deep Blue Sea; co-star Kenneth More felt he had poor chemistry with Leigh during the filming. In 1956, Leigh took the lead role in the Noël Coward comedy South Sea Bubble, but withdrew from the production when she became pregnant. Several weeks later, she miscarried and entered a period of depression that lasted for months. She joined Olivier for a European tour of Titus Andronicus, but the tour was marred by Leigh's frequent outbursts against Olivier and other members of the company. After their return to London, her former husband, Leigh Holman, who could still exert a strong influence on her, stayed with the Oliviers and helped calm her.

In 1959, when she achieved a success with the Noël Coward comedy Look After Lulu!, a critic working for The Times described her as "beautiful, delectably cool and matter of fact, she is mistress of every situation".

Considering her marriage to be over, Leigh began a relationship with actor John Merivale in 1960, who knew of Leigh's medical condition and assured Olivier that he would care for her. That same year, she and Olivier divorced and Olivier soon married actress Joan Plowright. In his autobiography, Olivier discussed the years of strain they had experienced because of Leigh's illness: "Throughout her possession by that uncannily evil monster, manic depression, with its deadly ever-tightening spirals, she retained her own individual canniness—an ability to disguise her true mental condition from almost all except me, for whom she could hardly be expected to take the trouble."

=== 1961–1967: Final years and death ===
Merivale proved to be a stabilising influence for Leigh, but despite her apparent contentment, she was quoted by Radie Harris as confiding that she "would rather have lived a short life with Larry [Olivier] than face a long one without him". Her first husband Leigh Holman also spent considerable time with her. Merivale joined her for a tour of Australia, New Zealand and Latin America that lasted from July 1961 until May 1962, and Leigh enjoyed positive reviews without sharing the spotlight with Olivier. Also on that tour was a young Patrick Stewart. Though she was still beset by bouts of depression, she continued to work in the theatre and, in 1963, won the Tony Award for Best Actress in a Musical for her role in Tovarich. She also appeared in the films The Roman Spring of Mrs. Stone (1961) and Ship of Fools (1965).

Leigh's last screen appearance in Ship of Fools was both a triumph and emblematic of her illnesses that were taking root. Producer and director Stanley Kramer, who ended up with the film, planned to star Leigh but was initially unaware of her fragile mental and physical state. (Note: At one point in the pre-production, Katharine Hepburn was considered for the role of Mary Treadwell, but dropped out and was replaced by Leigh.) Later recounting her work, Kramer remembered her courage in taking on the difficult role, "She was ill, and the courage to go ahead, the courage to make the film—was almost unbelievable." Leigh's performance was tinged by paranoia and resulted in outbursts that marred her relationship with other actors, although both Simone Signoret and Lee Marvin were sympathetic and understanding. In one unusual instance during the attempted rape scene, Leigh became distraught and hit Marvin so hard with a spiked shoe that it marked his face. Leigh won the L'Étoile de Cristal for her performance in Ship of Fools. (Note: L'Étoile de Cristal was the French equivalent of the Oscar.)

In May 1967, Leigh was rehearsing to appear with Michael Redgrave in Edward Albee's A Delicate Balance when her tuberculosis resurfaced. Following several weeks of rest, she seemed to recover. On the night of 7 July 1967, Merivale left her as usual at their Eaton Square flat to perform in a play, and he returned home just before midnight to find her asleep. About thirty minutes later (by now 8 July), he entered the bedroom and discovered her body on the floor. She had been attempting to walk to the bathroom and, as her lungs filled with fluid, she collapsed and suffocated. Merivale first contacted her family and later was able to reach Olivier, who was receiving treatment for prostate cancer in a nearby hospital. In his autobiography, Olivier described his "grievous anguish" as he immediately travelled to Leigh's residence, to find that Merivale had moved her body onto the bed. Olivier paid his respects, and "stood and prayed for forgiveness for all the evils that had sprung up between us", before helping Merivale make funeral arrangements; Olivier stayed until her body was removed from the flat. (Note: Leigh's death certificate gave her date of death as 8 July 1967, although she may have died before midnight the night before.)

Her death was publicly announced on 8 July, and the lights of every theatre in central London were extinguished for an hour. A Catholic service for Leigh was held at St. Mary's Church, Cadogan Street in London. Her funeral was attended by stars of British stage and screen. According to the provisions of her will, Leigh was cremated at the Golders Green Crematorium and her ashes were scattered on the lake at her summer home, Tickerage Mill, near Blackboys, East Sussex, England. A memorial service was held at St Martin-in-the-Fields, with a final tribute read by John Gielgud. In 1968, Leigh became the first actress honoured in the United States by "The Friends of the Libraries at the University of Southern California". The ceremony was conducted as a memorial service, with selections from her films shown and tributes provided by such associates as George Cukor, who screened the tests that Leigh had made for Gone with the Wind, the first time the screen tests had been seen in thirty years.

== Artistry and legacy ==
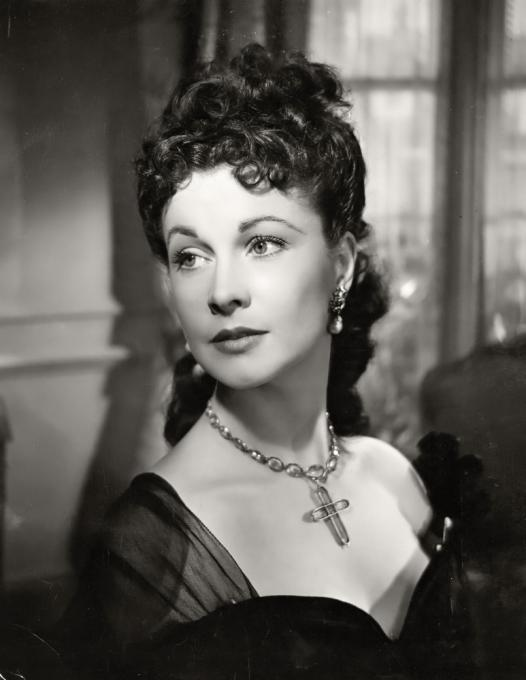
In Anna Karenina (1948)

Leigh was considered to be one of the most beautiful actresses of her day, and her directors emphasised this in most of her films. When asked if she believed her beauty had been an impediment to being taken seriously as an actress, she said, "People think that if you look fairly reasonable, you can't possibly act, and as I only care about acting, I think beauty can be a great handicap, if you really want to look like the part you're playing, which isn't necessarily like you."

Director George Cukor described Leigh as a "consummate actress, hampered by beauty", and Laurence Olivier said that critics should "give her credit for being an actress and not go on forever letting their judgments be distorted by her great beauty." Garson Kanin shared their viewpoint and described Leigh as "a stunner whose ravishing beauty often tended to obscure her staggering achievements as an actress. Great beauties are infrequently great actresses—simply because they don't need to be. Vivien was different; ambitious, persevering, serious, often inspired."

Leigh explained that she played "as many different parts as possible" in an attempt to learn her craft and to dispel prejudice about her abilities. She believed that comedy was more difficult to play than drama because it required more precise timing and said that more emphasis should be placed upon comedy as part of an actor's training. Nearing the end of her career, which ranged from Noël Coward comedies to Shakespearean tragedies, she observed, "It's much easier to make people cry than to make them laugh."

Her early performances brought her immediate success in Britain, but she remained largely unknown in other parts of the world until the release of Gone with the Wind. In December 1939, film critic Frank Nugent wrote in The New York Times, "Miss Leigh's Scarlett has vindicated the absurd talent quest that indirectly turned her up. She is so perfectly designed for the part by art and nature that any other actress in the role would be inconceivable", and as her fame escalated, she was featured on the cover of Time magazine as Scarlett. In 1969, critic Andrew Sarris commented that the success of the film had been largely due to "the inspired casting" of Leigh, and in 1998, wrote that "she lives in our minds and memories as a dynamic force rather than as a static presence". Film historian and critic Leonard Maltin described the film as one of the all-time greats, writing in 1998 that Leigh "brilliantly played" her role.

Her performance in the West End production of A Streetcar Named Desire, described by the theatre writer Phyllis Hartnoll as "proof of greater powers as an actress than she had hitherto shown", led to a lengthy period during which she was considered one of the finest actresses in British theatre. Discussing the subsequent film version, Pauline Kael wrote that Leigh and Marlon Brando gave "two of the greatest performances ever put on film" and that Leigh's was "one of those rare performances that can truly be said to evoke both fear and pity."

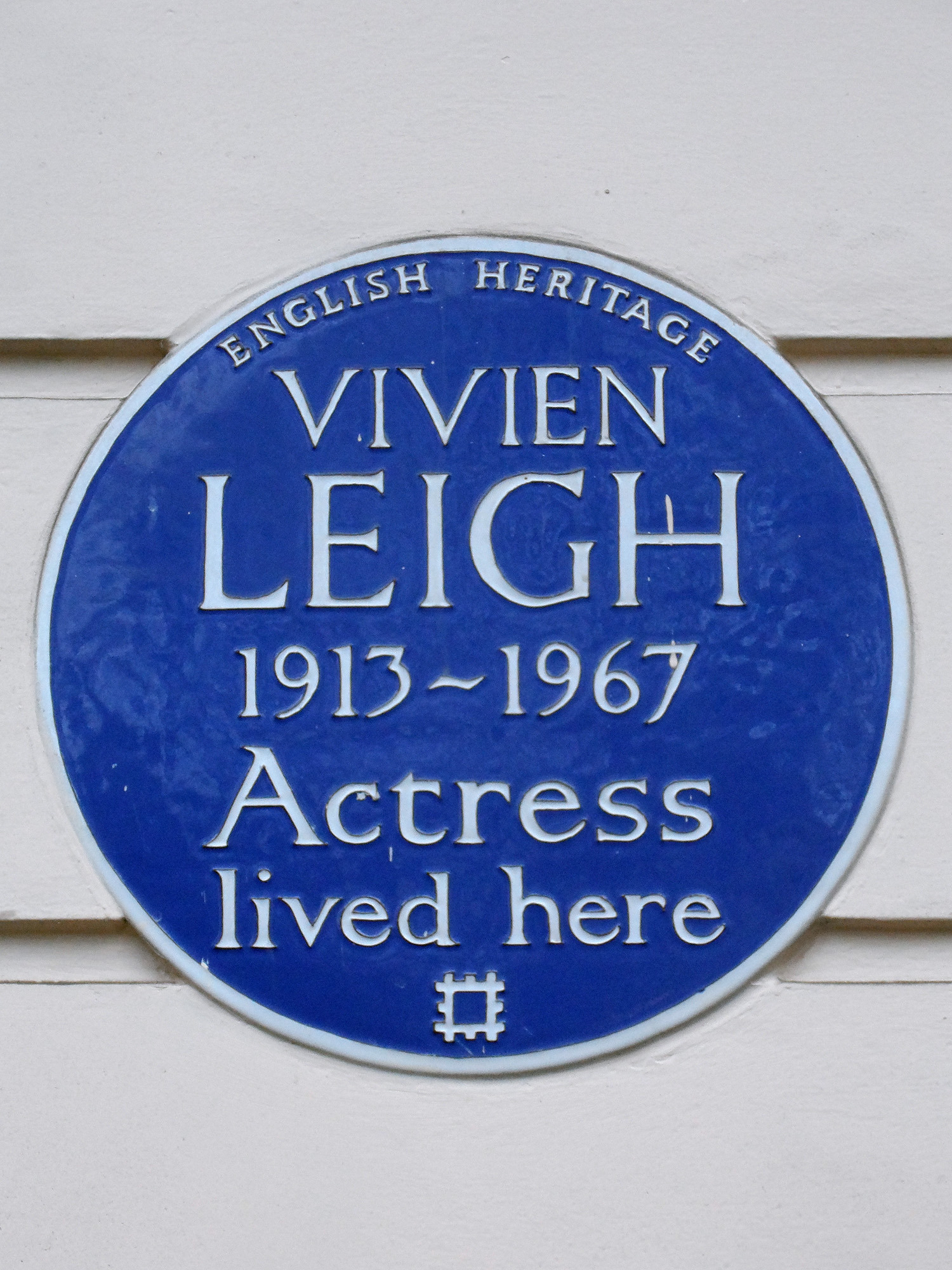
Blue plaque at Leigh's final home at 54 Eaton Square in Belgravia, central London

Her greatest critic was Kenneth Tynan, who ridiculed Leigh's performance opposite Olivier in the 1955 production of Titus Andronicus, commenting that she "receives the news that she is about to be ravished on her husband's corpse with little more than the mild annoyance of one who would have preferred foam rubber." He was also critical of her reinterpretation of Lady Macbeth in 1955, saying that her performance was insubstantial and lacked the necessary fury demanded of the role. After her death, however, Tynan revised his opinion, describing his earlier criticism as "one of the worst errors of judgment" he had ever made. He came to believe that Leigh's interpretation, in which Lady Macbeth uses her sexual allure to keep Macbeth enthralled, "made more sense ... than the usual battle-axe" portrayal of the character. In a 1983 interview after his death, Kenneth Tynan's widow derided her husband's vindictive campaign against Leigh as "completely unnecessary". Olivier dismissed it as jealousy; Leigh, however, was adversely affected by his comments. In a survey of theatre critics conducted shortly after Leigh's death, several named her performance as Lady Macbeth as one of her greatest achievements in theatre.

Leigh was portrayed by American actress Morgan Brittany in The Day of the Locust (1975), Gable and Lombard (1976) and The Scarlett O'Hara War (1980). English actress Julia Ormond played Leigh in My Week with Marilyn (2011). Leigh was also portrayed by Katie McGuinness in the Netflix miniseries Hollywood (2020). She will be portrayed by Carla Gugino in the upcoming biopic Vivien & the Florist.

In 1969, a plaque to Leigh was placed in the Actors' Church, St Paul's, Covent Garden, London. In 1985, a portrait of her was included in a series of United Kingdom postage stamps, along with Alfred Hitchcock, Charlie Chaplin, Peter Sellers and David Niven to commemorate "British Film Year". In April 1996, she appeared in the Centenary of Cinema stamp issue (with Sir Laurence Olivier) and in April 2013 was again included in another series, this time celebrating the 100th anniversary of her birth. The British Library in London purchased the papers of Olivier from his estate in 1999. Known as The Laurence Olivier Archive, the collection includes many of Leigh's personal papers, including numerous letters she wrote to Olivier. The papers of Leigh, including letters, photographs, contracts and diaries, were owned by her daughter, Suzanne Farrington (Farrington died in 2015). In 1994, the National Library of Australia purchased a photograph album, monogrammed "L & V O" and believed to have belonged to the Oliviers, containing 573 photographs of the couple during their 1948 tour of Australia. It is now held as part of the record of the history of the performing arts in Australia. In 2013, an archive of Leigh's letters, diaries, photographs, annotated film and theatre scripts and her numerous awards was acquired by the Victoria and Albert Museum in London. Also in 2013, Leigh was among the ten people selected by the Royal Mail for their "Great Britons" commemorative postage stamp issue.

== Credits and accolades ==
Association	Year	Category	Work	Result	Ref(s)
Academy Awards	1940	Best Actress	Gone with the Wind	Won	
Academy Awards	1952	Best Actress	A Streetcar Named Desire	Won	
British Academy Film Awards	1953	Best British Actress	A Streetcar Named Desire	Won	
Golden Globe Awards	1952	Best Actress in a Motion Picture – Drama	A Streetcar Named Desire	Nominated	
Hollywood Walk of Fame	1960	Inductee	—N/a	Won	
L'Étoile de Cristal	1966	Best Performance in a Leading Role	Ship of Fools	Won	
National Board of Review Awards	1940	Best Acting	Gone with the Wind; Waterloo Bridge	Won	
New York Film Critics Circle Awards	1939	Best Actress	Gone with the Wind	Won	
New York Film Critics Circle Awards	1952	Best Actress	A Streetcar Named Desire	Won	
Sant Jordi Awards	1957	Special Award for Acting	A Streetcar Named Desire	Won	
Tony Awards	1963	Best Actress in a Musical	Tovarich	Won	
Venice Film Festival Awards	1951	Volpi Cup for Best Actress	A Streetcar Named Desire	Won	
