= Barrow Street, Wiltshire =

Hamlet in Wiltshire, England

Coordinates: 51.0750°N 2.2325°W

Barrow Street
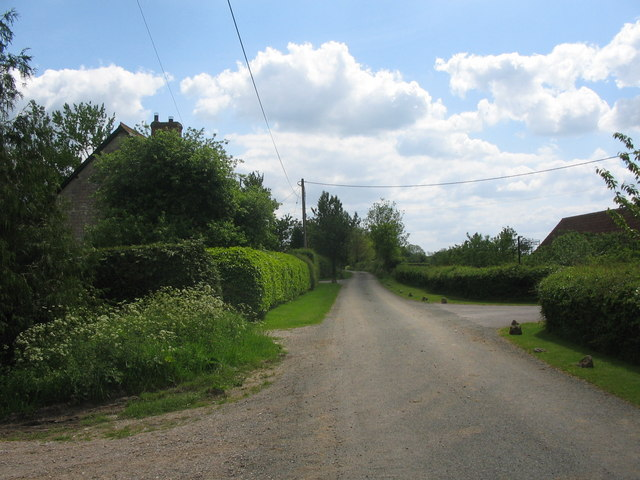
- The lane through Barrow Street, looking south

- Location within Wiltshire
- OS grid reference: ST838307
- Civil parish: Mere
- Unitary authority: Wiltshire
- Ceremonial county: Wiltshire
- Region: South West
- Country: England
- Sovereign state: United Kingdom
- Post town: Warminster
- Postcode district: BA12
- Police: Wiltshire
- Fire: Dorset and Wiltshire
- Ambulance: South Western
- UK Parliament: South West Wiltshire

Barrow Street is a hamlet in Wiltshire, England, about 1.9 miles (3.1 km) southeast of the town of Mere. The name comes from the early Bronze Age bowl barrow at Barrow Farm.

Barrow Farmhouse is from the 17th century.
