= Heath Hill Farm =

Protected area in Wiltshire, England

Coordinates: 51.100207°N 2.347748°W

Heath Hill Farm (grid reference ST757336) is a 20.73 hectare biological Site of Special Scientific Interest near Stourton in Wiltshire, notified in 1997. Part of the Stourhead estate, it is also situated within the Cranborne Chase and West Wiltshire Downs Area of Outstanding Natural Beauty.

The site is mainly grass meadows and pasture, with trees and thick hedges separating fields. It is surrounded mostly by woodland, once part of Selwood Forest. The underlying ground is made of Gault Clay and Upper Greensand. Where these two layers meet a number of springs rise to form a small stream, which passes through the site to become one of the headwaters of the River Stour. As a consequence the site contains a rich and unusual variety of grasses and herbs, including sedges and rushes.

== Sources ==
- Natural England citation sheet for the site (accessed 1 April 2022)
