= Bourton, Dorset =

Village in Dorset, England

Coordinates: 51.0723°N 2.3299°W

Bourton
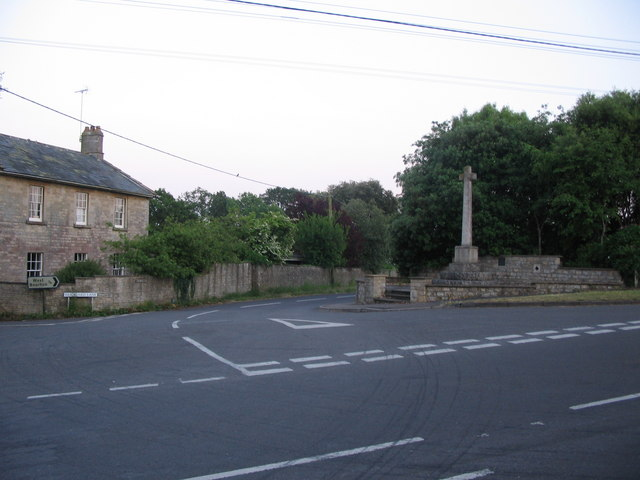
- Junction of Brickyard Lane, West Bourton Road and Main Rd

- Location within Dorset
- Population: 947 (2021 census)
- OS grid reference: ST7630
- Civil parish: Bourton
- Unitary authority: Dorset
- Ceremonial county: Dorset
- Region: South West
- Country: England
- Sovereign state: United Kingdom
- Post town: Gillingham
- Postcode district: SP8
- Dialling code: 01747
- Police: Dorset
- Fire: Dorset and Wiltshire
- Ambulance: South Western
- UK Parliament: North Dorset

Bourton is a village and civil parish in north Dorset, England, situated north of the A303 road on the border with Somerset and Wiltshire between Mere and Wincanton. The parish is the most northerly in Dorset and in the 2021 census had a population of 947. The village lies on the River Stour which passes through the historic Bourton Mill, once home to the second largest water wheel in Britain (60 feet (18 m) in diameter) .

The village has a store, a petrol station and a public house. The White Lion Inn stands on the High Street, which leads off what was the old main London to Exeter road before the village was bypassed to the south in 1992 by the A303. St George's Church, which stands on one of the highest points in the village, was built via public subscription in 1810 and borders the primary school of the same name.

The point at which the counties of Dorset, Somerset and Wiltshire meet beside the lake at the rear of Bourton Mill is marked by Egbert's Stone which once fell into the River Stour, but was rescued and re-erected. In 878 it formed the rallying point for Alfred the Great's troops before the Battle of Ethandun. His grandfather, Egbert of Wessex, was said to have placed the stone there to settle the shire boundaries. Just over the county border is King Alfred's Tower.

The mill, which is mentioned in the Domesday Book, has had many incarnations. As a linen mill it processed flax and supplied canvas to the Royal Navy but when industry declined it was developed into a foundry with a blast furnace and was one of the first places to make the new threshing machines in the West of England. It went on to build boilers, steam lorries and gas engines as well as gaining a reputation as a builder of water wheels. During the First World War Mills bombs were produced here in vast quantities. After the Gasper dam burst upriver in the summer of 1917, much of the machinery was washed from the factory and it took a number of years for industry to restart on the site. When it did return in 1933 the factory entered its final phase as a dried milk processing plant and this continued up until its closure in 1998. It has now been demolished to make way for the Mill Lake development.

Chaffeymoor House, located in an Area of Outstanding Natural Beauty at Chaffeymoor, is a large 17th-century house. It is a grade II listed building. Its gardens are open to the public.

The nearest railway station is in neighbouring Gillingham. Trains run on the Exeter to Waterloo line.

== Governance ==
At the lower level of local government, Bourton is a civil parish with a parish council of nine elected members.

At the upper level of local government, Bourton is in Dorset unitary district. For elections to Dorset Council, it is in Gillingham electoral ward. Historically, Bourton was in the liberty of Gillingham. It was in Shaftesbury rural district from 1896 to 1974, and then North Dorset from 1974 until Dorset became a unitary district in 2019.

For elections to the House of Commons, it is in North Dorset parliamentary constituency.

== Demographics ==
Census population of Bourton parish
Census	Population	Female	Male	Households	Source
1921	715				
1931	652				
1951	630				
1961	579				
1971	520				
1981	660				
1991	660				
2001	772	396	376	325	
2011	822	418	404	364	
2021	947	491	456	406	
