= 7th (City of London) Battalion, London Regiment =

3rd City of London Rifle Volunteers 7th (City of London) Battalion, London Regiment 32nd Searchlight Regiment, RA 567 (7th City of London) Searchlight Regiment, RA
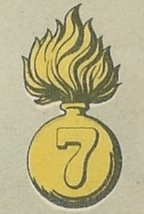
- Cap badge of the 7th London Regiment (Post Office Rifles) after 1920
- Active: 1860–1961
- Country: United Kingdom
- Branch: Territorial Army
- Type: Infantry Battalion; Searchlight Regiment; Anti-Aircraft Regiment
- Role: Infantry; Air Defence
- Part of: London Regiment
- Garrison/HQ: Great Tower Street; New Broad Street; Sun Street, Finsbury Square (1903–1961)
- Nicknames: Working Men's; Shiny Seventh
- March: My Lady Greensleeves
- Engagements: WWI: Battle of Festubert; Battle of Loos; Battle of the Somme; Battle of Bullecourt; 3rd Battle of Ypres; Battle of Cambrai; Battle of Villers Bretonneux; Battle of Amiens WWII: Battle of Britain; The Blitz; Operation Diver

Commanders
- Notable commanders: Alfred Bate Richards

The 7th (City of London) Battalion of the London Regiment was a volunteer unit of the British Army from 1860 until 1961. Recruited from London working men, it sent volunteers to the Second Boer War, saw extensive service on the Western Front during World War I, and defended the United Kingdom as a searchlight regiment during World War II.

== Origins ==
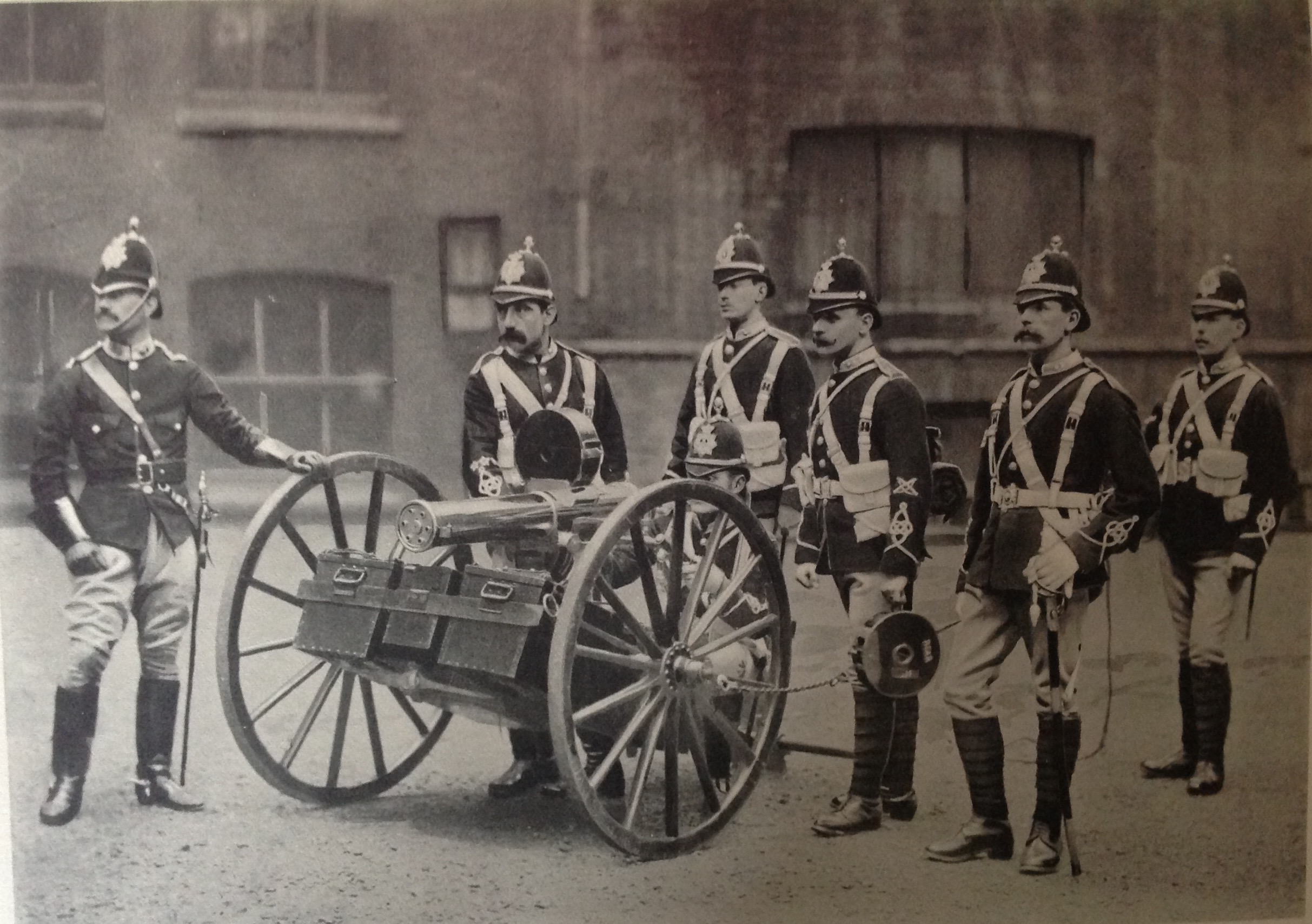
Machine gun of the 3rd London Rifle Volunteers, c1895

An invasion scare in 1859 led to the creation of the Volunteer Movement in Britain. One of the movement's leaders was the journalist, playwright and poet Alfred Bate Richards, who convened a meeting at St Martin's Hall, Long Acre, London, on 16 April 1859 that led the War Office to authorise the recruitment of Rifle Volunteer Corps (RVCs). Richards himself enlisted 1000 men to form the 'Workmen's Volunteer Brigade'. Although the unit began holding parades at the City of London's Guildhall in the autumn of 1860, the first officers' commissions were not issued until 26 April 1861, when the unit was formally adopted as the 3rd City of London RVC. The men were generally less well-off than some other London RVCs recruited from the professions and middle classes, but the unit received some financial support from the City of London and the Livery Companies. It adopted a scarlet uniform with buff facings and brass buttons, at first with a bearskin and red plume, later with a kepi, together with the motto LABOR OMNIA VINCIT (Work conquers everything) derived from Virgil.

Under the Childers Reforms the RVCs became Volunteer Battalions of Regular Army regiments on 1 July 1881. The 3rd London RVC was designated as the 11th Volunteer Battalion, King's Royal Rifle Corps (KRRC) but continued to use its former title and did not adopt the Rifle green uniform and black buttons of the KRRC.

The battalion did not have its own drill hall, and drill parades were held at Regent's Park, the Ditch of the Tower of London and at Gray's Inn Square. Prize-givings and inspections were held in the Guildhall, and the annual inspection was carried out at Horse Guards Parade. Church parades were held at St Bride's Church, Fleet Street. The headquarters was first at 26 Great Tower Street, then 38 New Broad Street, both in the city, and afterwards at 76 Farringdon Road in Clerkenwell, but in 1903 the battalion raised enough money to obtain larger premises at 24 Sun Street, Finsbury Square.

During the Second Boer War the 3rd City of Londons provided a contingent of the City Imperial Volunteers raised at the Guildhall after the events of Black Week, and volunteers from the battalion also served with the KRRC. For this the unit received its first Battle Honour: South Africa 1900–02.

== Territorial Force ==
Under the Haldane Reforms that created the Territorial Force in 1908, the battalion was included in the new all-Territorial London Regiment, taking its place as the 7th (City of London) Battalion. It was assigned to 2nd London Brigade in the 1st London Division. Unlike many battalions of the London Regiment the 7th Battalion had no traditional name, but was nicknamed the 'Shiny Seventh' because it wore brass buttons in a brigade whose other battalions all wore black Rifle buttons.

== World War I ==
=== Mobilisation ===
The battalion had just arrived in camp at Eastbourne for annual training on Sunday 2 August 1914 when news reached them of the mobilisation of the Continental Powers. The battalion immediately entrained for London and the men returned to their homes. Mobilisation came on 5 August. The men were accommodated in Curtain Road and Scrutton Street schools, the transport in Broad Street Goods Yard, and the officers at the Armfields Hotel. A week later, the Commanding Officer, Viscount Hood, asked if the men would volunteer for foreign service, and practically the whole battalion did so, making it eligible to be sent overseas. The men who did not so volunteer, or were unfit, were constituted as a second battalion to which the new recruits were directed. This was named the 2/7th Londons, the service battalion becoming the 1/7th Londons under the command of Col Edward Faux, a long-serving officer of the regiment. In April 1915 a reserve battalion, named 3/7th Londons, was organised to train and supply drafts to the other battalions serving overseas.

=== 1/7th Battalion ===
In the weeks following the outbreak of war the 1/7th was marched to training camps at Bisley, Surrey, Crowborough, Sussex, and finally Watford, Hertfordshire, where it joined the 4th London Brigade in 2nd London Division. 1st London Division had been temporarily broken up as a number of individual London TF battalions had already been sent overseas, and the 2nd London Division was being brought back up to full strength in order to proceed to France as a formation. The 1/7th spent the winter of 1914–15 at Watford and then entrained for Southampton, disembarking at Le Havre on 18 March 1915.

==== Festubert ====
The 2nd London Division, soon afterwards numbered 47th (1/2nd London) Division, went into the line near Béthune to be instructed in trench warfare by Regular troops, the 1/7th carrying out working parties and suffering its first casualties. After holding a section of the line near Festubert in early May, the battalion became the first in the 47th Division to go into action. As the left hand unit of the division it was temporarily attached to the neighbouring 22nd Brigade of 7th Division, which attacked on 16 May during the Battle of Festubert. Elements of the battalion advanced as far as the German support line, but found themselves ahead of their flanking troops and returned to hold the captured German front line. Their casualties that day were 23 killed and 128 wounded.

==== Loos ====
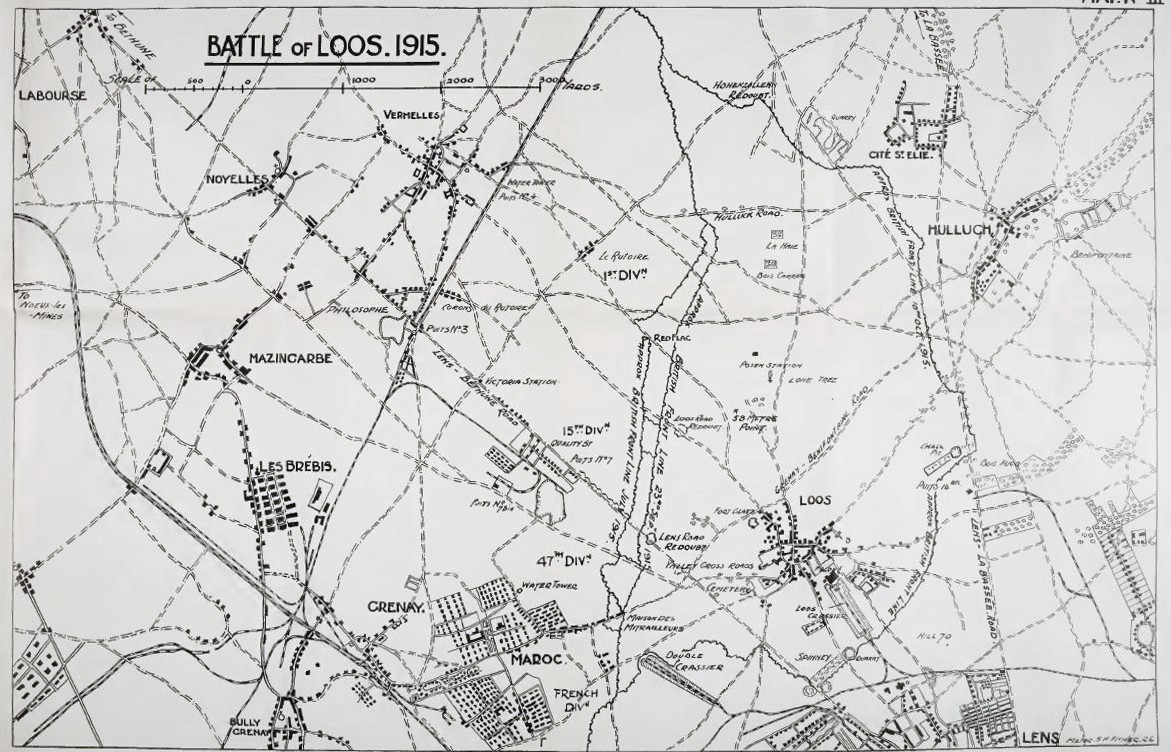
The Battle of Loos 1915

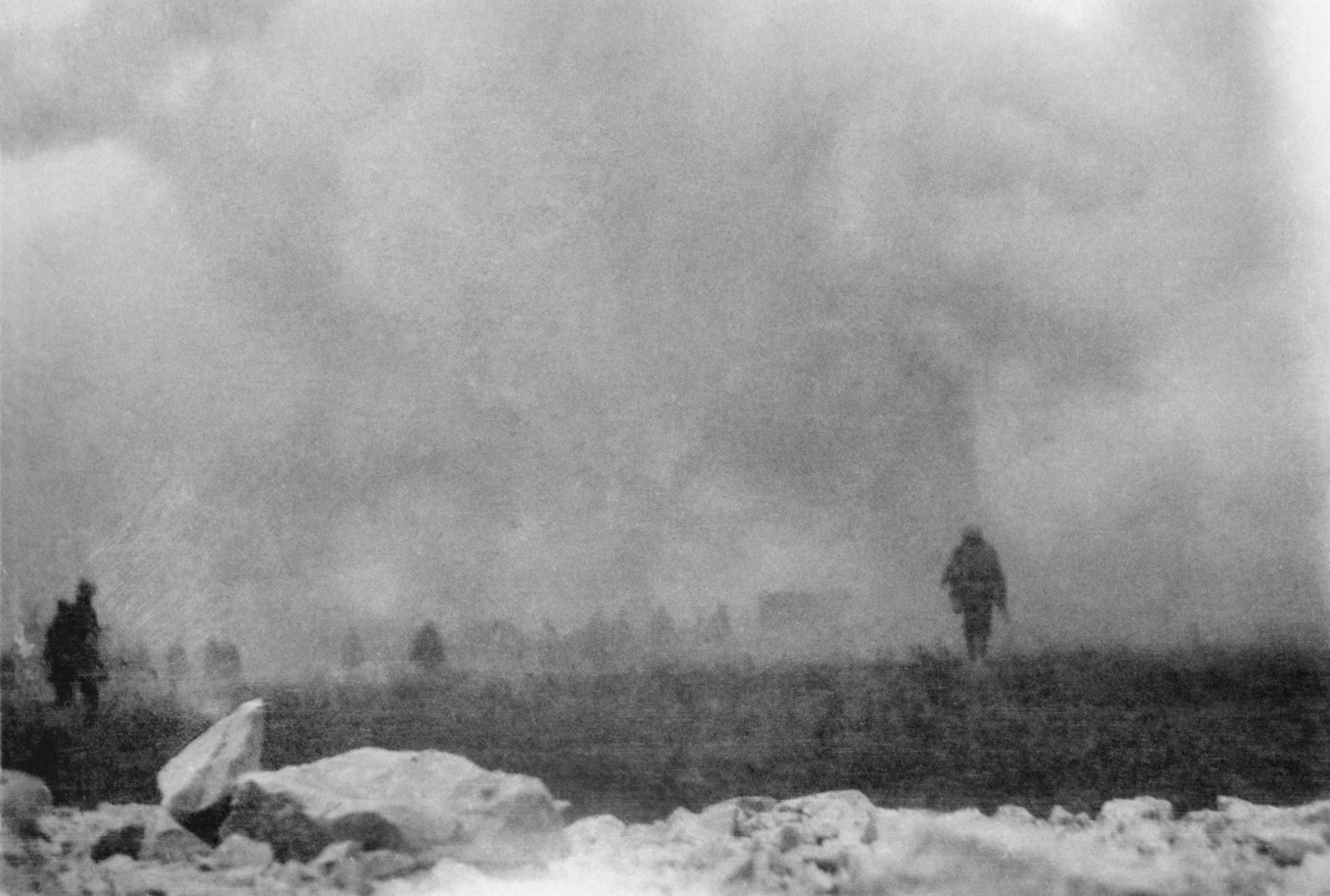
British infantry advancing through a gas cloud at Loos, 25 September 1915

After spending the summer holding the line near Loos, the battalion was withdrawn for intensive training for the forthcoming Battle of Loos. This was a carefully rehearsed attack that began on 25 September 1915 following four days of bombardment and the release of a gas cloud. The battalion's first objective in this attack was a mining Spoil tip known as the Double Crassier, then it was to move on to take the German second line about 400 yards further on. The battalion followed the gas and smoke cloud and successfully captured its objectives. It then consolidated the position and beat off a counter-attack. Casualties for the day were heavy, totalling 14 officers and 250 other ranks.

==== Vimy ====
During the winter of 1915–16 the 1/7th Londons carried out regular tours of duty in the Loos sector. losing a steady stream of casualties to artillery and mine attacks. In March 1916 the 47th Division took over part of the Vimy sector on the west side of the Vimy Ridge. On 21 May 140 Bde (temporarily under the command of Col Faux of the 1/7th) was subjected to a heavy bombardment, and the Germans attacked in the evening. The weight of the attack fell on 1/7th and 1/8th Londons, who were forced back from their front and support lines halfway down the slope. 1/7th made a local counter-attack, but it was too weak to succeed. After a night and day of confusion, the 1/6th and 1/7th Bns pushed forward 250 yards to reoccupy an old French trench which they consolidated and thereby prevented any further enemy advance. They were relieved in the evening of 22 May, having suffered heavy casualties.

==== High Wood ====
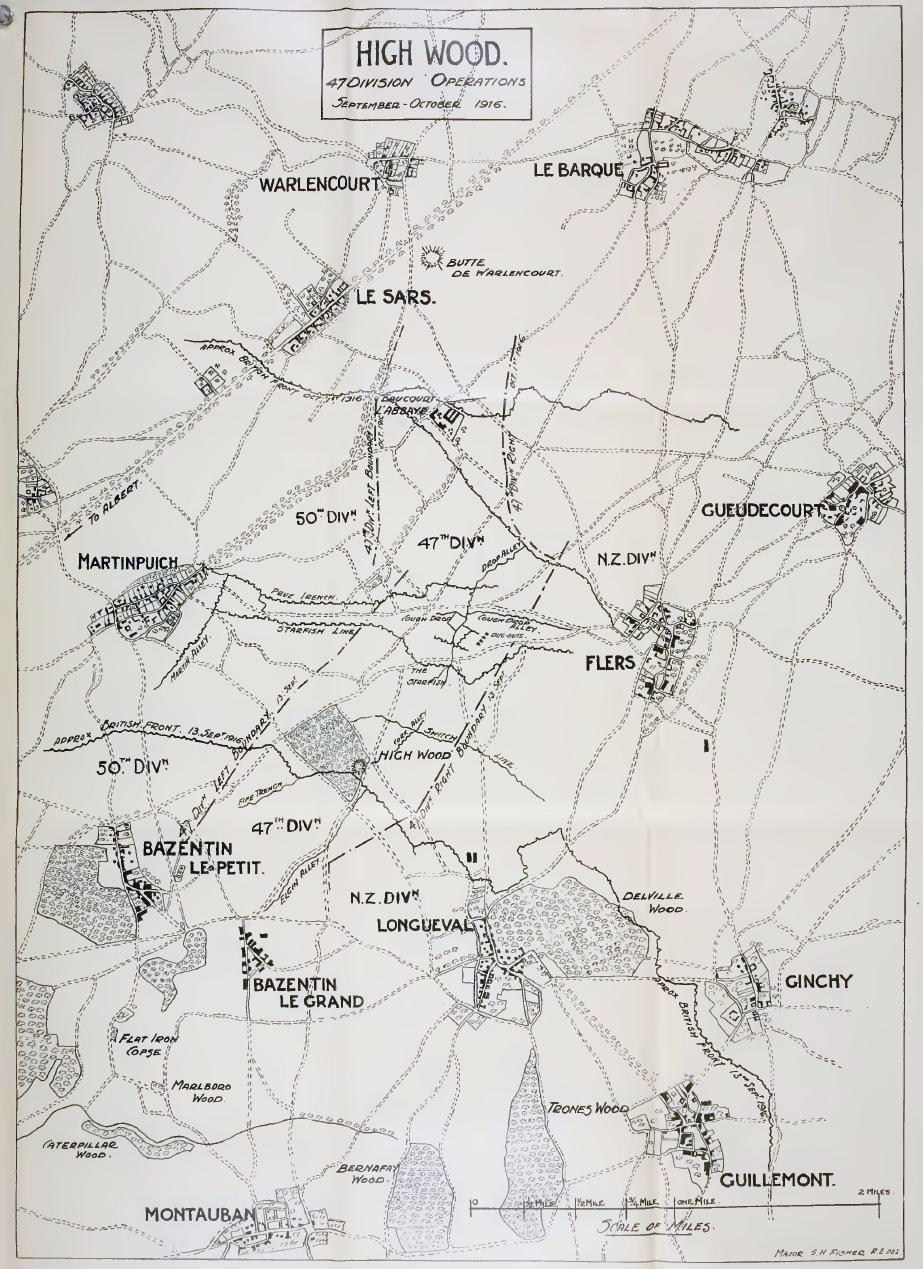
The 47th Division's attack at High Wood, 15 September 1916

In late July 1916 the 1/7th marched south to begin training to enter the ongoing Somme offensive. The battalion practised on positions marked out by flags, and adopted identification stripes on their arms: A Company blue, B Co green, C Co red and D Co yellow. On 15 September, 47th Division attacked High Wood to cover the left flank of the tank-led attack of the adjacent divisions on Flers. The first objective for 140 Bde was a line clear of High Wood (the Switch Line), the second was the Starfish Line on the forward slope, and then the strong Flers Line. The 1/7th and 1/15th were to open the attack, after which the 1/8th would pass through to capture the Starfish Line and finally the 1/6th would pass through and continue to the Flers Line. The 1/7th advanced rapidly behind a creeping barrage and took over 100 prisoners, but suffered severe casualties in taking the Switch Line and consolidating just in front of it. The battalion was relieved on the evening of 17 September and moved forward to relieve the 1/8th in the Starfish Line, where they were counter-attacked and bombarded for two days. By the time they left the line on 20 September the 'Shiny Seventh' were caked in mud and had suffered over 300 casualties. The regiment was awarded the battle honour Flers-Courcelette.

==== Butte de Warlencourt ====
In rest camp the battalion was reinforced by a draft of nearly 200 troops from the East Surrey Regiment and returning wounded men of the 7th. It then returned to the High Wood sector on 5 October for another general attack, this time with little preparation. Thebattalion was to attack through the 1/8th Londons (Post Office Rifles) and seize the objective, a mound known as the Butte de Warlencourt. At first casualties were light, but after some 300 yards the leading waves reached the skyline and were virtually wiped out by machine-gun fire. The survivors dug in as darkness fell, with the nearest supports some 600 yards away. After a day under shellfire the battalion was withdrawn the following night. Casualties had been another 300 officers and men. This action won the regiment the battle honour Le Transloy.

==== Ypres ====
The 47th Division transferred to the Ypres Salient, at that time a quiet sector, and the 1/7th received a draft from the 25th (County of London) Cyclist Battalion, who had spent the whole war so far in England and were unusually well trained. For several months the battalion did tours of duty in the line in the area of Hill 60 and 'The Spoilbank'. This was part of the line being prepared for the Battle of Messines, and the troops were carefully trained for this set-piece attack. After the explosion of huge British mines on 7 June, the task of 1/7th was to attack from the Spoilbank, take the German front lines and then swing round to capture the 'White Chateau'. The attack broke through with little opposition, but was held up at the White Chateau. The 1/6th Londons then passed through and the two battalions enveloped and captured the position. The captured area was consolidated and held despite shelling and German counter-attacks. Over three days the battalion suffered 64 officers and men killed, 275 wounded and 13 missing.

On 15 September a 60-man party of the battalion, after special training, made an afternoon attack on a troublesome German strongpoint in front of the 'Clapham Junction' position. This had held up several previous attacks but the 1/7th Londons took it, naming it 'Cryer Farm' after 2/Lt B.N. Cryer who was killed leading the attack. The position was reinforced during the night and held off three counter-attacks before the battalion handed over the sector to Australian troops on 16 September and left the Salient.

==== Bourlon Wood ====
On 29 November 1917 the 47th Division took over defence of Bourlon Ridge, captured during the recent Battle of Cambrai. The defences were rudimentary, and the Germans attacked the following day, accompanied by a heavy bombardment and ground attack aircraft. 1/7th had been occupying Kangaroo Trench, a support line; that night they moved up through a sunken road into the front line, and attacked the following morning: 'the opposition was not very severe and the attack resulted in fifty-two prisoners and eighteen machine-guns being captured and the line advanced between three and four hundred yards'. However, casualties had once again been heavy, and the line was later abandoned as the division pulled back to a more defensible position.

In February 1918 a number of British infantry battalions were disbanded because of a manpower crisis. 1/7th Londons was among these. Battalion HQ and 200 men selected from pre-war Territorials and those who had served longest with the battalion were drafted to the 2/7th Battalion (see below). A large draft (14 officers and 375 men from A, B and D Companies) went to reinforce the 1/19th Londons in 141 Bde of 47th Division, and five officers and 140 men of C Company went to the 1/7th Middlesex Regiment in 56th (1st London) Division. The remaining men of the 1/7th were sent to join remnants of nine other battalions to form 6th Entrenching Battalion.

=== 2/7th Battalion ===
The 2/7th Londons formed on 31 August 1914 was rapidly recruited, and marched to Burgess Hill in Sussex on 19 November 1914 to begin training. Uniforms were issued soon afterwards, but rifles remained scarce for some time. Later, Japanese .256-inch rifles were issued, and these remained in use for training until 1916. The battalion made three moves during 1915: first to Crowborough, then to Norwich in April, and finally to Ipswich on 19 June. The 2/7th Bn had been assigned to the 2/2nd London Brigade of 2/1st London Division (later renumbered 174th Bde and 58th Division respectively) and the division concentrated around Ipswich in Spring 1915, forming part of First Army, Central Force (Home Defence). In Spring 1916 it took over coastal defence duties in the area.

The 2/7th Bn remained at Ipswich for 13 months, and during that time sent over 800 NCOs and men to reinforce the 1/7th Bn in France, while training new recruits to replace them. Later the practice stopped, as 58th Division was prepared for overseas service, and 3/7th Bn took over training duties. In July 1916, 58th Division left its coastal defence role and concentrated at Sutton Veny for final training on Salisbury Plain. On 26 January 1917, the battalion entrained at Warminster for Southampton Docks, where it embarked for France, landing at Le Havre the following day.

==== Bullecourt ====
On 8 February the battalion went into the line for the first time, at Monchy-au-Bois and Ransart, south of Arras. This was considered a quiet sector, and the 2/7th were introduced to trench warfare by the 1/5th and 1/6th Bns South Staffordshire Regiment of 46th (North Midland) Division. On 5 May the battalion began training for a forthcoming attack, the Second Battle of Bullecourt. On the night of 18 May the 2/7th moved up into the second line behind the 2/6th Londons, who were to attack on the 21st. The attack was unsuccessful, and the 2/7th relieved the 2/6th the following night. 'A' Company was sent forward to clear a German trench, but were heavily shelled and subjected to German counter-attacks until 'B' Company advanced across the open to reinforce them. This successful action cost the battalion 120 killed and wounded.

==== Ypres ====
After a period of trench holding near Arras, the 58th Division moved to the Ypres Salient in late August 1917. In the attack of 20 September (the Battle of the Menin Road Ridge), the 2/7th was the reserve battalion of 174 Bde. After the leading battalions had taken Hubner Trench, the 2/7th followed through to Genoa Farm, where they suffered badly from German shellfire. After dark the 2/7th moved on to reinforce the line captured by the 2/6th, where the shelling was less intense. The following day the men had an unusual opportunity to cause heavy casualties with rifle and Lewis gun fire to Germans attempting to cross in the open to relieve their remaining positions, and then watch as a British barrage fell on German troops massing for counter-attack. Later in September the weather broke, and during the spells spent holding the front line of flooded craters in the Poelcappelle area the battalion suffered the full horrors of the Battle of Passchendaele.

When the 1/7th Bn was disbanded in February 1918 (see above), its Battalion HQ and a draft of 200 long-service men were transferred to the 2/7th, which thereafter became simply the 7th Battalion. Surplus men of the 2/7th went to the 17th Entrenching Bn.

==== Villers Bretonneux ====
When the German spring offensive opened on 21 March 1918, 58th Division was positioned across the River Oise. Although 173 Bde was heavily attacked and forced back by the end of the day, 174 Bde south of the river was not attacked and remained in position until 26 March, when it was withdrawn, By 4 April, 7th Bn was in reserve positions at Bois L'Abbe, just in front of Villers-Bretonneux, the latest German objective. The battalion was not directly involved in the First Battle of Villers-Bretonneux, but on 18 April it was subject to an intense bombardment with Mustard gas shells and suffered heavy casualties, particularly to HQ, and had to be relieved. Again, the 7th Londons were not directly engaged in the Second Battle of Villers-Bretonneux but lost more men to shellfire and gas during the action, in which they witnessed the first tank versus tank action in history.

==== Amiens ====
For the opening attack of the Battle of Amiens on 8 August 1918, 174 Bde was given the initial objective of capturing Malard Wood. 6th and 7th Londons led the assault, with 8th Bn in support. The attack proceeded well, but all three battalions became mixed up. After reorganization on the first objective, the four companies of 7th Bn went forward and captured the ravine behind, and supplies were brought up by supply tank and dropped by aircraft. 173 Brigade had been unable to take their objective of Chipilly Ridge, so they took over the Malard Wood line to launch a second attack. On 9 August the 7th then made a hastily organised attack with tanks and American troops, which successfully cleared Chipilly Ridge and Gressaire Wood. Casualties had been heavy – over two days the 7th lost 300 men – but the results were excellent. After the Battle of Amiens, the battalion was reinforced with men from the Staffords and the Lincolns and began to train intensively for mobile warfare.

The 7th Londons went back into action on 26 August, attacking towards Maricourt. The attack was a huge success, but the battalion again suffered heavy casualties from machine-gun and artillery rearguards. The 7th had advanced about 1,000 yards and held 'D' Copse, which enabled the neighbouring Australians to sweep up the valley. The following day the battalion attacked behind a barrage to take Maricourt.

The Londons attacked at Épehy on 8 September, finding the opposition stronger than expected and receiving many casualties. After a rest, the battalion attacked again in the same area on 18 September, still meeting strong resistance.

After that, it was withdrawn for rest and reorganisation, returning to the line in early October in the Lens sector. Here the enemy had begun to retreat, attacks on 2 and 3 October went well, and thereafter the campaign became a pursuit across the Escaut River. When the Armistice came into effect on 11 November, the battalion was at Beloil in Belgium. The 7th Londons were then billeted at Péruwelz until demobilisation was completed in June 1919.

=== 3/7th Battalion ===
The 3/7th Battalion was formed at Orpington in April 1915 under the command of Lt-Col Sir Pieter C. van B. Stewart-Bam, a South African soldier and politician who had been in charge of the London Recruiting District for the TF. The role of the 3/7th was to train and despatch drafts to replace casualties in the 1/7th and 2/7th (and later other units) serving overseas. Stewart-Bam used his connections to arrange with the Dominion High Commissioners in London for the battalion to act as a training unit for officer cadets from the Dominions and Colonies. During the war there were often 70 officers training with the reserve battalion; at one time 37 were from South Africa alone. The battalion sent some drafts to the King's African Rifles serving in the East African Campaign.

The 3/7th began training at Sun Street, then from September 1915 at a brewery at Orpington. In January 1916 the battalion moved to Fovant, where there was a large purpose-built camp on the edge of the Salisbury Plain training area. While quartered here, the men of the sister battalion the 3/6th Londons started a fashion by cutting their regimental badge into the turf of Fovant Down to reveal the white chalk beneath, making it visible from a long distance. A number of other battalions in the camp did likewise, including the 3/7th who cut theirs on nearby Sutton Down. The Fovant badges are now a scheduled monument, but those on Sutton Down have not yet been restored.

The 3/7th Bn was redesignated 7th Reserve Bn London Regiment on 8 April 1916, and was assigned to the 1st London Reserve Group (later Brigade). It left Fovant in January 1917 and moved to Dartmouth, Devon, and finally to Blackdown in April 1917, where it remained for the rest of the war training replacements and convalescents for service on the Western Front. It was disbanded on 22 August 1919.

In total, 8,631 men of all ranks passed through the three battalions of the 7th Londons, of whom 88 officers and 1,430 other ranks died.

=== 29th Battalion ===
In June 1915 the 'Home Service-only' and unfit men of the TF were formed into Provisional units for home defence. The men of the 7th Londons joined those from the 1st, 2nd and 4th Londons to form 100th Provisional Battalion. When the Military Service Act 1916 swept away the Home/Overseas Service distinction, all TF soldiers became liable for drafting overseas if medically fit, and the provisional battalions became numbered battalions of their parent regiments on 1 January 1917. 100th Provisional Battalion became 29th (City of London) Battalion, London Regiment.

== Interwar ==
During the war the London Regiment had been disbanded and its battalions affiliated to Regular regiments. This was usually to their pre-1908 regiment, but the 7th was instead assigned to the Middlesex Regiment (Duke of Cambridge's own) (this corrected the anomaly of a brass-buttoned unit being attached to a rifle regiment). However, the battalions retained their titles as London regiments. When the renamed Territorial Army was reformed in 1920–22, the 8th Londons (Post Office Rifles) were not reconstituted but merged into the 7th, which became the 7th London Regiment (Post Office Rifles). Unlike some London units, which suffered slow recruitment in the postwar years, such as the 6th (City of London Rifles), or the 13th (Kensingtons), recruitment was brisk in the combined 7th, which was the strongest battalion in the reformed 56th (1st London) Infantry Division.

In 1935 the increasing need for anti-aircraft (AA) defence, particularly for London, was addressed by converting 47th (2nd London) Infantry Division into 1st Anti-Aircraft Division and reorganising a number of London Territorial infantry battalions into searchlight battalions of the Royal Engineers (RE). The 7th Londons became 32nd (7th City of London) Anti-Aircraft Battalion RE (TA) on 15 December 1935 and the Post Office Rifles name was discontinued. From now on private soldiers were referred to as Sappers. Despite transfer to the Royal Engineers, they continued to wear their 7th Londons cap badge. The battalion was assigned to 28th (Thames and Medway) AA Group with the following organisation, the company locations reflecting a broader recruiting area and the doubling of the size of the unit:

- HQ at Sun Street, Finsbury Square, later at Napier House, Grove Park, Lewisham
- 328th Anti-Aircraft Company at Finsbury Square
- 329th Anti-Aircraft Company at Grove Park
- 330th Anti-Aircraft Company at Grove Park
- 331st Anti-Aircraft Company at Bexleyheath – new company formed 1935

As the number of Territorial AA units and formations increased, they were grouped into Anti-Aircraft Command. In April 1939, 331 Company transferred to help form the new 73rd (Kent Fortress) Anti-Aircraft Battalion, RE.

== World War II ==
=== Mobilisation ===
90 cm 'Projector Anti-Aircraft', displayed at Fort Nelson, Portsmouth

The TA's AA units were mobilised on 23 September 1938 during the Munich Crisis, with units manning their emergency positions within 24 hours, even though many did not yet have their full complement of men or equipment. The battalion was embodied and proceeded to its war stations on the north bank of the River Thames from Shoeburyness to Canvey Island with HQ at Purfleet. The emergency lasted three weeks, and they were stood down on 13 October. In June 1939, as the international situation worsened, a partial mobilisation of AA Command was begun in a process known as 'couverture', whereby each AA unit did a month's tour of duty in rotation to man selected AA gun and searchlight positions. 32 Searchlight Bn began moving in June 1939, with 330 Company, followed by 328 in July and 329 in August, completing a deployment to Laindon, Southend-on-Sea, and adjoining parts of Essex. However, this scheme was altered in August and the equipment placed in readiness at Hadleigh. On 24 August, ahead of the declaration of war, AA Command was fully mobilised at its war stations.

32 Searchlight Bn was deployed with HQ and 329 Company at Framlingham, 328 Company at Bildeston and 330 Company at Saxmundham. The battalion mobilised as part of 29 (East Anglian) AA Brigade, but by the end of September it had come under the command of 41 (London) AA Brigade in 2 AA Division The equipment was modern 90-centimetre searchlights with early pattern sound locators.

=== Battle of Britain ===
The first months of the war were quiet, but on the night of 7/8 June 1940 the battalion was the first searchlight unit to bring down an enemy aircraft, the crew of a Heinkel He 115 coastal reconnaissance aircraft being dazzled by a detachment at Rendelsham and crashing nearby.

On the night of 18/19 June a strong night air raid crossed the coast at Harwich and flew through the battalion area. Many of the aircraft were illuminated and seven were shot down by Spitfires, one flown by Sqn-Ldr Adolph Malan, even though the day fighters had no other detection equipment.

In July 1940, the battalion was transferred from 41 AA Bde to 6 AA Brigade, which had originally been created to command the AA units in the Norwegian Campaign. After the evacuation of British forces from Norway it reformed in 2 AA Division as a light AA brigade in southern East Anglia, commanding widely spaced S/L sites and LAA guns scattered at VPs, mainly Royal Air Force airfields in Essex; the brigade soon afterwards came under 6 AA Division. The battalion's companies were controlled by the Operations Room at RAF Debden.

On 1 August 1940 all the RE searchlight units were transferred to the Royal Artillery (RA), and the battalion became 32nd (7th City of London) Searchlight Regiment, RA (TA) in August 1940; Sappers were retitled Gunners, and Companies became Batteries.

=== The Blitz ===
In September 1940 the main night-bombing campaign against London and the cities of the United Kingdom (The Blitz) began, and cooperation between searchlights and RAF night-fighters as well as AA guns became increasingly important. Anti-Aircraft Command was rapidly increased in size. Existing regiments provided cadres to help train new units: 32 S/L Regiment sent three such cadres to establish new batteries, and between September and November 1940 ran a Regimental Training Centre at Brandeston Hall to provide initial training for 400 new recruits. 32 S/L Regiment sent a cadre of experienced officers and men to 231st S/L Training Rgt at Blandford Camp, where they formed a new 562 S/L Bty from 1914 recruits on 17 April 1941. 562 S/L Battery joined the regiment on 15 July 1941. The new battery completed its training at Brettenham Hall.

The S/L layouts had been based on a spacing of 3500 yards, but due to equipment shortages this had been extended to 6000 yards by September 1940. In November this was changed to clusters of three lights to improve illumination, but this meant that the clusters had to be spaced 10,400 yards apart. The cluster system was an attempt to improve the chances of picking up enemy bombers and keeping them illuminated for engagement by AA guns or Night fighters. Eventually, one light in each cluster was to be equipped with searchlight control (SLC) radar and act as 'master light', but the radar equipment was still in short supply.

=== Mid-War ===
6 AA Division formation badge.

By October 1941 the availability of SLC radar was sufficient to allow AA Command's S/Ls to be 'declustered' into single-light sites spaced at 10,400-yard intervals in 'Indicator Belts' along the coast and 'Killer Belts' at 6000-yard spacing inland to cooperate with the RAF's night fighters.

In late 1941 the battalion began to receive SLC-equipped 90-cm searchlight projectors to replace sound locators. These required relocation of some sites to obtain best results. Early in 1942 the regiment shifted some of its sites southwards, including parts of Essex, with 328 Battery based at Felixstowe, 330 Battery at Manningtree, from where it covered Shotley Royal Naval Training Establishment (HMS Ganges) and the Harwich Naval Base, and 562 Battery covering Colchester and Chelmsford. These three batteries came under the control of RAF North Weald Operations Room. Regimental HQ also moved to Manningtree. Part of 328 Battery's duties was to provide 'Canopy' for RAF Martlesham Heath, where a cone of searchlights over the airfield assisted homing aircraft. This duty ended when the US Eighth Air Force took over Martlesham Heath. The regiment also provided 'Canopy' for RAF Wattisham in the spring of 1941.

By May 1942, the regiment was still under the command of 6 AA Bde, but 328 and 330 Btys were attached to 27 (Home Counties) AA Bde defending London. In June these two batteries switched to 56th Light AA Bde in 6 AA Division. By October, the whole regiment was under the command of 56 LAA Bde, though 329 Bty was still attached to 6 AA Bde.

=== Later War ===
The radar equipment, and larger 150-centimetre searchlights, gave increasingly successful results with Heavy AA guns and in cooperation with the new generation of RAF night fighters. 32 S/L Regiment usually cooperated with 85 Squadron flying Havocs and later Mosquitos from RAF Hunsdon and 29 Sqn and the New Zealand 488 Sqn flying Mosquitos from RAF Bradwell Bay. Low-flying attacks by German fighter-bombers were often engaged by Light AA guns and by the searchlight detachments themselves with twin Vickers machine guns.

As the air defence battle was being won, men began to be withdrawn from AA Command to provide manpower for 21st Army Group in the Invasion of Normandy. Many roles such as plotters, drivers and telegraphists in 32 S/L Regiment were taken over by women of the Auxiliary Territorial Service (ATS), freeing able-bodied men for other duties, while 562 Battery was wholly disbanded in early 1944.

From July to August 1944 the regiment was actively engaged in assisting operations against V-1 flying bombs (Operation Diver), many of those crossing the East Anglian coast having been launched from aircraft over the Dutch Coast.

After VE Day, 32 S/L Regiment staffed release centres at Oxford and Reading, Berkshire to administer the demobilisation process. Regimental HQ, which had been reduced to a cadre at Derby as a holding unit, was placed in suspended animation in 1946.

== Postwar ==
When the Territorial Army was reconstituted on 1 January 1947, the regiment reformed as 567 Searchlight Regiment RA (7th City of London) (TA), with its HQ at Shoreditch, forming part of 75 AA Bde. In March 1949 it was redesignated 567 (Mixed) Light Anti-Aircraft/Searchlight Regiment, RA (TA) ('Mixed' indicating that some of the personnel were drawn from the Women's Royal Army Corps). When AA Command was disbanded on 10 March 1955, the regiment was merged into 265 Light Anti-Aircraft Regiment, RA, becoming 'P' (7th City of London) Battery.

Successor units still occupy Grove Park and Bexleyheath drill-halls, as 265 (Home Counties) Air Assault Battery, Royal Artillery in 106th (Yeomanry) Regiment Royal Artillery, and 265 (Kent and County of London Yeomanry (Sharpshooters)) Support Squadron in 71 (City of London) Yeomanry Signal Regiment, Royal Corps of Signals. Both units strive to continue and maintain the traditions and history of their predecessor Regiments.

The Regimental and Association standards are displayed along with a Regimental memorial plaques within The Army Reserve Centre, Baring Road, Grove Park, London SE12 0BH. Also Regimental silver for both the 7th and 8th (City of London) Battalions, other items of Regimental Property including the standards for the Temple Bar and St Paul's Association, the Third Regiment of Loyal London Volunteers and a painting of the Duke of Clarence and Avondale presented by King George V. These can be viewed by prior appointment.

Old comrades still parade at Grove Park for their remembrance service every year.

== Battle honours ==
The regiment was awarded the following Battle honours (those in bold indicate the honours chosen to appear on the Regimental Colours):

South Africa, 1900–1902

Aubers; Festubert, 1915; Loos; Somme 1916 '18; Flers-Courcellette; Le Transloy; Bullecourt; Messines, 1917; Ypres, 1917; Menin Road; Passchendaele; Cambrai, 1917; Avre; Villers Bretonneux; Amiens; Albert, 1918; Bapaume, 1918; Hindenburg Line; Epehy; Pursuit to Mons; France and Flanders 1915–18.

After the 1922 merger with the Post Office Rifles, that unit's honour Egypt 1882 was added.

The RA and RE do not receive battle honours, so none were awarded to the regiment for its service during World War II.

== Honorary Colonels ==
In 1860, Alfred Bate Richards invited Maj-Gen William Ferguson Beatson of the Bengal Army to be the 3rd London RVC's honorary colonel. Beatson was in London in connection with a court case and had been supported by Richards and the Radicals in a series of high-profile disagreements with the War Office. Beatson took the salute at a parade in the Guildhall on 22 September 1860, but was under orders to return to India and was unable to accept the role permanently.

The following served as official Honorary Colonels of the regiment:

- Sir William de Bathe, Bt (1861–68) – first CO of 3rd London RVC'
- Field Marshal Robert Napier, 1st Baron Napier of Magdala, GCB, GCSI (1868–90)
- Prince Albert Victor, Duke of Clarence and Avondale, KG, KP, ADC (1890–92)
- Colonel R.P. Laurie, CB, VD, MP, JP (1892–1904) – former CO of 3rd London RVC
- Colonel C.E. Stevenson, VD (1904–21) – former CO of 3rd London RVC
- Colonel E. Faux, CMG, VD (1921–23) – former CO of 1/7th Londons
- Brigadier-General Sir Arthur Maxwell, KCB, CMG, DSO & Bar, TD (1923–35) – former CO of 1/8th Londons and GOC 174 Bde.
- Colonel J. Trevor (1935–?) – formerly of 5th Londons (London Rifle Brigade)'

== Prominent Members ==
- Lt-Col Viscount Hood, a former major in the Grenadier Guards who commanded the 7th Battalion from 1912 until the outbreak of war in 1914, when he relinquished command on medical grounds.
- Sir Bill Jordan, New Zealand High Commissioner to London 1936–51, who had been a sergeant in the 3rd London RVC before emigrating in 1904.
- Maj Richard Long, later 3rd Viscount Long, a former officer in the Royal Wiltshire Yeomanry, who commanded 329 Battery in 1941–42.
- Maj Sir Kenneth Peppiatt, KBE, MC and Bar, Chief Cashier of the Bank of England 1934–49, served with the 1/7th and later 2/7th Bns during World War I and was second-in-command of the battalion in 1920.
- Lt-Col Sir Pieter Carizius van Beorhmestein Stewart-Bam, OBE, South African soldier and politician, commanded 3/7th Londons in World War I.
- Major-General Sir Percy Robert Laurie KCVO CBE DSO - Commissioned Second Lieutenant in the 3rd London Volunteer Rifle Corps in August 1901

== Memorials ==
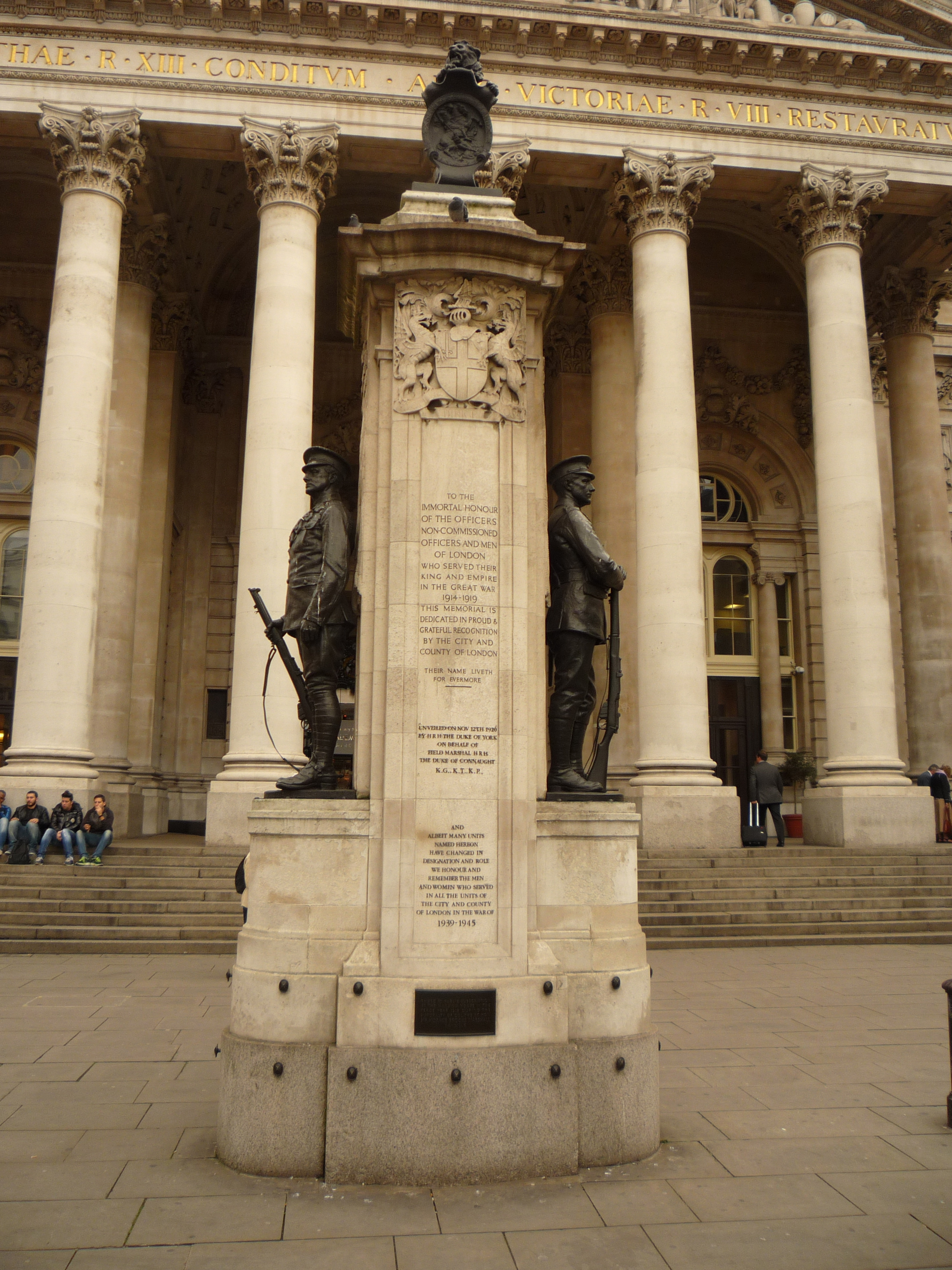
The London Troops Memorial at the Royal Exchange, London.

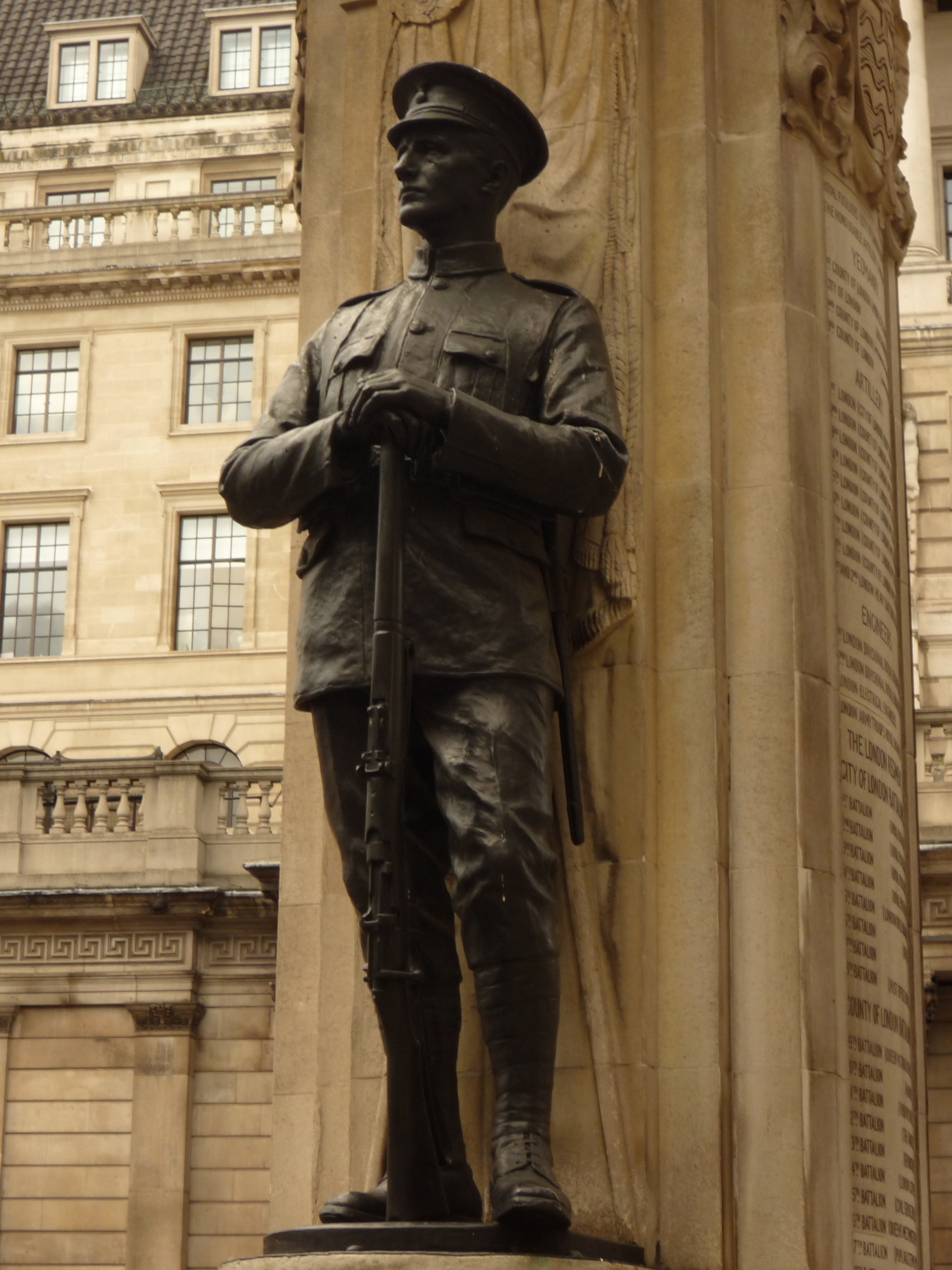
Infantry figure on the London Troops Memorial, Royal Exchange, London

The regiment is one of those whose titles are inscribed on the City and County of London Troops Memorial in front of the Royal Exchange, London, with architectural design by Sir Aston Webb and sculpture by Alfred Drury. The right-hand (southern) bronze figure flanking this memorial depicts an infantryman representative of the various London infantry units.

The regimental memorial plaque for the First World War is held at the Army Reserve Centre on Deansbrook Road, Edgware, HA8 9BA, whilst that for the Second World War is at another Army Reserve Centre on Baring Road, Grove Park, London SE12 0BH.

== Traditions ==
The regiment claimed descent from the Yellow Regiment, London Trained Bands, the Temple Bar and St Paul's Association (1798–1802) and the Third Regiment of Loyal London Volunteers (1803), but these units had been disbanded long before. In 1914–18 the regiment adopted the former slow march of the London Trained Bands, My Lady Greensleeves, as its quick march, replacing Austria (by military composer Johann Nowotny), which had been used until then - as well as on the occasion of Officers' Dinner Nights by the King's Dragoon Guards). The Regimental Colour presented in 1909 repeated the device of the Temple Bar & St Paul's Association (a depiction of the West Front of St Paul's Cathedral).

After conversion to Royal Artillery, the regiment in 1941 adopted a shoulder flash in the 7th Londons' colours of scarlet and buff on a black background, superimposed with the gold grenade bearing the number 7 of the regimental badge.

== Online sources ==
- British Army units from 1945 on
- British Military History
- Great War Forum
- The Long, Long Trail
- Orders of Battle at Patriot Files
- Land Forces of Britain, the Empire and Commonwealth (Regiments.org)
- The Regimental Warpath 1914–1918
- The Royal Artillery 1939–45
- Graham Watson, The Territorial Army 1947
