= The Blues Kitchen =

English barbecue restaurant chain

- Type: Private
- Industry: Restaurant and entertainment
- Founded: 2009
- Headquarters: London, United Kingdom
- Number of locations: 3

The Blues Kitchen are live music venues, specialising in rare bourbon and barbecue. The restaurant currently operates three sites in London; on Camden High Street near Camden Town Station, on Curtain Road near Old Street Station in St Luke's and on Acre Lane near Brixton Station. A fourth venue opened on Quay Street in Manchester in 2021.

== History ==
The Blues Kitchen opened in Camden in October 2009 and was founded by The Columbo Group's directors Steve Ball and Riz Shaikh, both of whom were voted in the "Top 1000 Most Influential" list by the Evening Standard in 2014 and 2015.

The Columbo Group also own London venues The Old Queen's Head, Metropolis, The Jazz Café, The Parakeet and Phonox, and was awarded with the Best Late Night Operator 2015 award by The Morning Advertiser's Publican Awards.

== Music and influences ==
The team behind The Blues Kitchen venues spent years exploring the Deep South of the United States. Visiting Texas, Tennessee, Alabama, New Orleans, Mississippi, Arkansas and Kentucky. They became life-long friends with numerous American musicians, chefs, and Juke joint owners.

All of The Blues Kitchen venues serve Southern, pit style, slow smoked barbecue, burgers and chicken wings.

The venues host club nights every weekend with DJs playing Motown, Stax and 1960s rock n' roll records. The live music programme presents new and established Blues, soul, funk and Americana artists. The Beekays, The Sierra Band, Atlantic Soul Orchestra and The Reputations all play weekly residencies at the venues.

Seasick Steve, Gary Clark Jr, Martha Reeves & The Vandellas, Wayne Kramer of the MC5, Mud Morganfield (Muddy Waters eldest son), The Libertines, Kitty, Daisy & Lewis, Fat White Family, Huey Morgan (Fun Lovin Criminals), Andrew Weatherall, Cedric Burnside, Tav Falco, North Mississippi Allstars, R.L. Boyce, Cedell Davis, Mystery Jets, The Maccabees, Tribes, and The Jim Jones Revue have all performed at The Blues Kitchen.

The Blues Kitchen releases live sessions and interviews on their YouTube & Spotify channels. Episodes are presented by The Blues Kitchen founder Liam Hart.

The Blues Kitchen channels have hosted notable guests including: Ronnie Wood (The Rolling Stones), Bobby Gillespie (Primal Scream), Nathaniel Rateliff, Kurt Vile, Hermanos Gutierrez, Monophonics, Margo Price, Graham Nash, Steve Earle, The Blind Boys of Alabama, The Budos Band, Lee Fields, Charles Bradley, Justin Townes Earle, Jimmie Vaughan, Rival Sons, Fantastic Negrito, Ryan Bingham, Robert Finley, Songhoy Blues, Keb Mo, Marcus King, George Clinton (Parliament-Funkadelic), The Black Crowes, Gary Clark Jr, Drive By Truckers, Robert Cray, Wilko Johnson, White Denim, Cage the Elephant, Black Rebel Motorcycle Club and Seasick Steve.

Weekly episodes of The Blues Kitchen Radio are released via Spotify.

The Blues Kitchen is also the current record holder for the World's Longest Musical Jam, having hosted a 100-hour non-stop music session in June 2019 to celebrate their tenth birthday. The three-day event saw 500+ artists take to the stage, raising over £10,000 for the Help Refugees and Camden Music Trust charities.

== See also ==
- List of barbecue restaurants
