= Sutton Mandeville =

Village in Wiltshire, England

Coordinates: 51.059°N 2.020°W

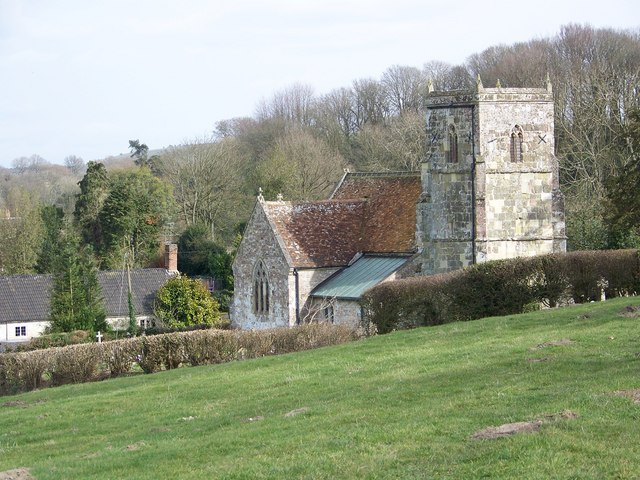
- All Saints Church

- Location within Wiltshire
- Population: 232 (in 2011)
- OS grid reference: ST987289
- Civil parish: Sutton Mandeville
- Unitary authority: Wiltshire
- Ceremonial county: Wiltshire
- Region: South West
- Country: England
- Sovereign state: United Kingdom
- Post town: SALISBURY
- Postcode district: SP3
- Dialling code: 01722
- Police: Wiltshire
- Fire: Dorset and Wiltshire
- Ambulance: South Western
- UK Parliament: Salisbury
- Website: www.suttonmandevillepc.org

Sutton Mandeville is a small village and civil parish in Wiltshire, England, in the Nadder valley and towards the east end of the Vale of Wardour. The village lies south of the river and north of the A30 Shaftesbury-Wilton road, about 7 miles (11 km) west of Wilton and 2.5 miles (4 km) east of the large village of Tisbury.

== Hamlets ==
The hamlet of Sutton Row is about one mile west of Sutton Mandeville village. Lower Chicksgrove, in the northwest of the parish and on the left (north) bank of the Nadder, was transferred from Tisbury parish in 1986.

The Apshill area, south of the river on the road from Sutton Row to Lower Chicksgrove, was also part of the transfer from Tisbury parish. The hamlet here, which includes the Compasses Inn, is unmarked on a 1958 Ordnance Survey map but on some modern maps is labelled as Chicksgrove.

== History ==
No prehistoric sites are recorded in the area, although an Iron Age hillfort known as Castle Ditches lies to the west in Tisbury parish. Domesday Book in 1086 recorded a settlement of 25 households at Sudtone, with woodland and a mill.

Later landowners included the Wyndham family of Dinton House (later Philipps House).

In 1859 the Salisbury and Yeovil Railway opened their line from Salisbury to Gillingham, following the Nadder valley and crossing the parish north of Sutton Mandeville. The station at Dinton was closed in 1966; Tisbury station remains in use, and the line forms part of the route from London Waterloo to Exeter via Salisbury.

=== Military camps ===
During the First World War, in the fields to the south of the village across to Sutton Down thousands of British and Australian soldiers were encamped in temporary wooden huts, undergoing training and preparation for the battlefields of France and Belgium. They made up two camps, one to the north of the A30 road and another to the south. Soldiers from various regiments were present at different times, among them the 7th Battalion of the London Regiment (known as the Shiny 7th), The Royal Warwickshire Regiment, The Royal Field Artillery and the First Australian Imperial Force.

==== Hillside badges ====
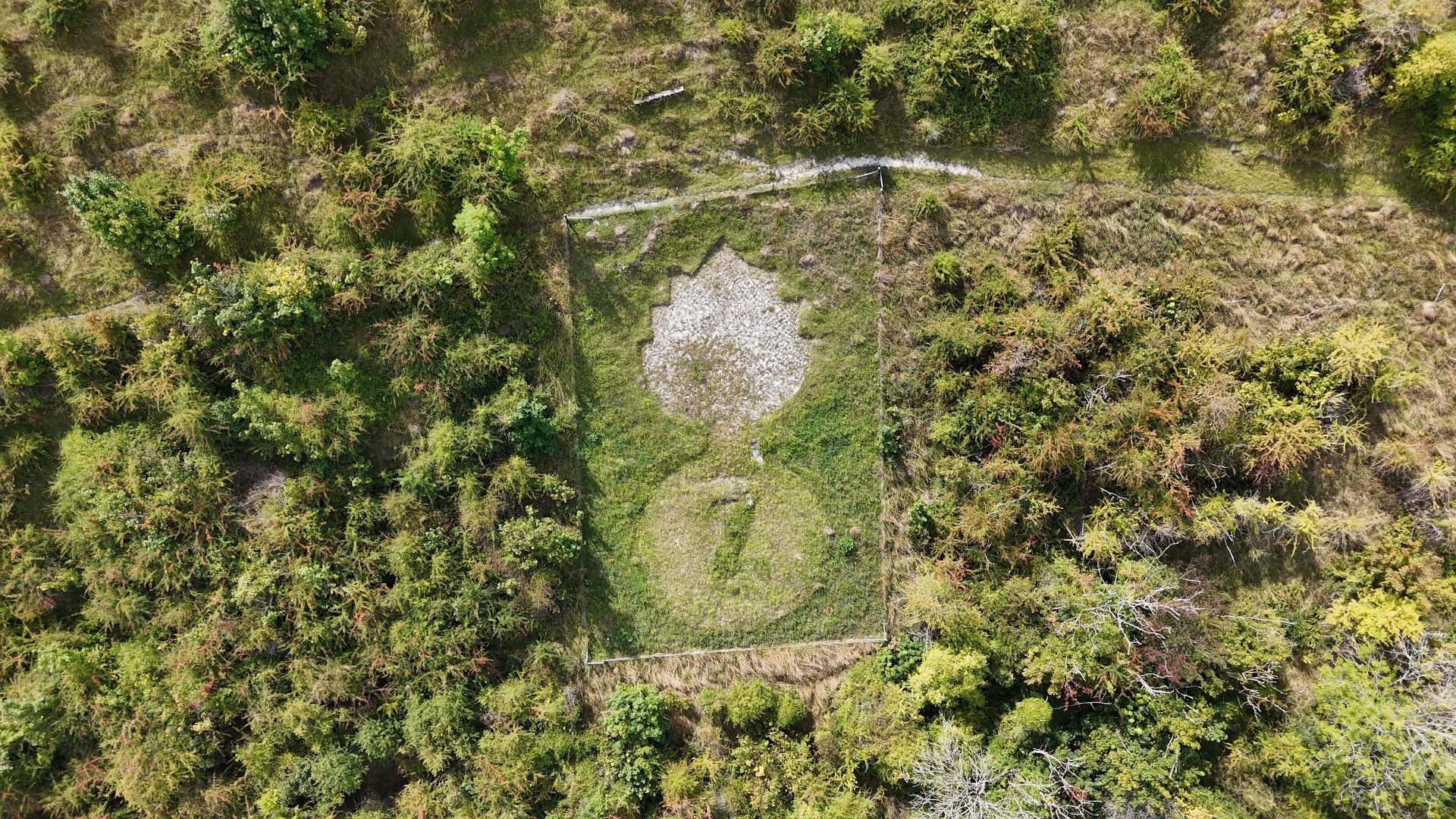
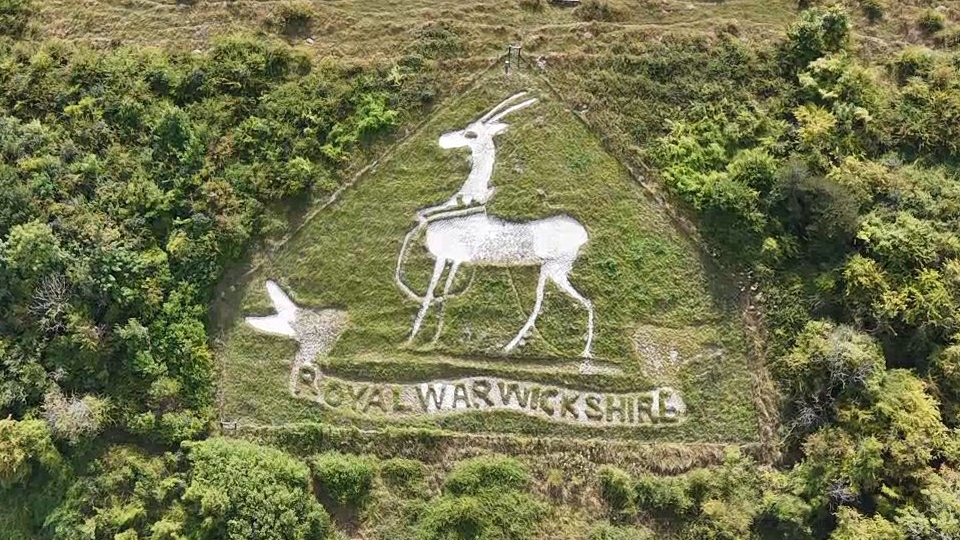
Left: Shiny 7th badge on the hillside (August 2025, in a state where scouring is required)
Right: The Warwickshire Regiment badge on the hillside at grid reference ST984271

Sutton Mandeville has two hillside badges. Soldiers of the Shiny 7th and the Warwickshire Regiment each carved their regimental cap badges on the chalk downland of Sutton Down in 1916. These were cared for by the Fovant Badges Association until the 1990s, after when they started to become overgrown. In 2018 a local group was formed to uncover the badges and restore them to their former condition; renovation work was carried out in 2018–19 and they are now clearly visible from the A30.

== Parish church ==
The parish church dedicated to All Saints, built in uncoursed dressed limestone, dates from the 13th century; the chancel arch is from that period. The chancel was restored in 1850 and there was further restoration in 1862. The church was recorded as Grade II* listed in 1966.

The three-stage west tower was built in the 15th century and carries three bells: one possibly dated 1399, the others cast by John Wallis in 1615 and 1616. In the churchyard is a late 17th-century sundial, restored in the 19th century.

At some point the benefice was united with those of Fovant and Compton Chamberlayne. In 1979 the benefice of Teffont Evias with Teffont Magna was added to the union and a team ministry was established, today known as the Nadder Valley benefice and covering fourteen parishes with sixteen churches.

== Notable buildings ==
Church Farmhouse, now a dwelling, began as a cottage in the 17th century. An 18th-century watermill on the Nadder, northwest of the village, was in use to grind flour until the 1940s.

Chicksgrove Manor at Lower Chicksgrove is Grade II* listed. The house, in rubble stone under a thatched roof, has 14th-century origins and is described by Historic England as "a very fine Wiltshire manor house retaining many features from different periods of its development". Behind the house is an 18th-century timber-framed granary, on staddle stones.

Apshill House, part of the hamlet between Sutton Row and Lower Chicksgrove, dates from the 14th century and was altered and extended in the 16th and 17th. Historic England state it is "an unusual survival of a hall house". The Compasses Inn, in the same hamlet, is a late 17th-century building.

== Governance ==
The parish has a locally elected parish council, which was created in 1974 to replace the earlier parish meeting. This is consulted on all parish matters, while most significant local government functions are carried out by Wiltshire Council, a unitary authority.

== Notable people ==
- John Wyndham (1870–1933), cricketer and army officer, born in the parish

== See also ==
- List of hill figures in Wiltshire
