= John Wyndham (disambiguation) =

John Wyndham (1903–1969) was a British science fiction writer.

John Wyndham may also refer to:

- Sir John Wyndham (died 1573), of Orchard Wyndham
- Sir John Wyndham (1558–1645), of Orchard Wyndham, English landowner involved in the defence of the West Country against the threat of Spanish invasion
- John Wyndham (of Norrington), MP for Salisbury in 1681 and 1685
- John Wyndham, 6th Baron Leconfield and 1st Baron Egremont (1920–1972), British peer
- John Wyndham (High Sheriff), High Sheriff of Sussex
- John Wyndham (cricketer), English cricketer
- Max Wyndham, 2nd Baron Egremont, usually known as Max Egremont, whose full name is John Max Henry Scawen Wyndham.
