= Emma Richards =

Emma Richards may refer to:

- Emma Richards (sailor), British yachtswoman
- Emma Richards (minister) (1927–2014), Mennonite pastor
- Emma Gaggiotti Richards (1825–1912), Italian painter
