= Alfred Bate Richards =

English journalist and author

Alfred Bate Richards (1820–1876) was an English journalist and author. He turned from law to literature and was the author of a number of popular dramas, volumes of poems, and essays. He was the first editor of The Daily Telegraph, and afterwards of the Morning Advertiser. He was one of the leading advocates for the volunteer movement.

== Early life ==
He was born on 17 February 1820 at Baskerville House, Worcestershire, the eldest son of John Richards of Wassell Grove near Stourbridge, who was M.P. for Knaresborough from 1832 to 1837. He was educated at the Edinburgh high school and Westminster School, where he was admitted on 18 January 1831. He matriculated at Exeter College, Oxford, on 19 October 1837 and graduated B.A. in 1841. One of his friends at Oxford was Richard Francis Burton, and Richards later wrote a biography of the explorer.

Richards entered his name as a law student at Lincoln's Inn on 16 May 1839. was called to the bar at Lincoln's Inn on 20 November 1845, and for a brief time he went on circuit; but he soon began to write full-time. On 15 February 1849 he married the artist Emma Camilla Angela Maria Gaggiotti. Her father, Camillo Gaggiotti was the minister of war in Rome.

== Journalist ==
From 1848 to 1850 Richards edited a weekly newspaper, The British Army Despatch. On 3 August 1850 he started a new weekly journal, The Mirror of the Time, which lasted only a year. From 29 June to 31 December 1855 he was the first editor of the Daily Telegraph. In 1870 Richards was appointed editor of the Morning Advertiser, in succession to James Grant, and held the position until his death.

Together with authors and journalists such as Charles Dickens and William Makepeace Thackeray, Richards was a leading member of the Administrative Reform Association, founded in 1854. He was on the platform for the Association's meeting of 26 January 1856 that strongly criticised the failings of the British Government that had contributed to the fall of the Turkish fortress of Kars towards the end of the Crimean War.

== Volunteer movement ==
Richards was an advocate of enrolling of rifle corps throughout United Kingdom as a precaution against invasion; and while editor of The Daily Telegraph he publicised the subject. In 1858 he was appointed secretary of the National and Constitutional Defence Association, which was formed to give effect to the scheme. A public meeting was held, through his efforts, in St. Martin's Hall, Long Acre, on 16 April 1859; Admiral Sir Charles Napier presided, and, as a result, the War Office issued, on 12 May 1859, a circular which authorised the enrolling of rifle volunteers.

Richards then hired rooms in the City of London, and enlisted 1000 men to form the 'Workmen's Volunteer Brigade'. Although the unit began holding parades at the City of London's Guildhall in the autumn of 1860, the first officers' commissions were not issued until 26 April 1861, when the unit was formally adopted as the 3rd City of London Rifle Volunteer Corps. The men were generally less well-off than some other London corps recruited from the professions and middle classes, but the unit received some financial support from the City of London and the Livery Companies. It adopted the motto LABOR OMNIA VINCIT (Work conquers everything) derived from Virgil.

Richards invited Maj-Gen William Ferguson Beatson of the Bengal Army to be the 3rd London RVC's honorary colonel. Beatson was a friend of Richard Francis Burton and was in London in connection with a court case. He had previously been supported by Richards and the Radicals in a series of high-profile disagreements with the War Office. Beatson took the salute at a parade in the Guildhall on 22 September 1860, but was under orders to return to India and was unable to accept the role permanently.

The 3rd London RVC needed a wealthy patron, and Richards next persuaded Sir William de Bathe, Bt to become the Lieutenant-Colonel commandant, with Richards his second-in-command, ranked as a Major. In 1861 Bathe and Richards became Honorary Colonel and Lt-Col Commandant respectively. Richards retired from the position in 1867, but the unit continued without him, becoming the 7th (City of London) Battalion London Regiment in 1908. The Standards and Colours of these units are still on display at Grove Park Army Reserve Centre and can be viewed by appointment.

At the same time that he was raising the 3rd London RVC, Richards was also a member of the Garibaldi Special Fund, along with the journalist George Holyoake. The Committee raised money to send a force of volunteers, the 'British Legion', to assist Giuseppe Garibaldi in his campaign to liberate the Kingdom of the Two Sicilies from its Bourbon overlords. Many of the 'Garibaldi Excursionists', as the Legion was nicknamed, were members of the new Rifle Volunteer Corps.

== Death and legacy ==
Richards died on 12 June 1876, in his fifty-seventh year, at 22 Brunswick Square, London, and was buried in St. Peter's churchyard, Croydon. The rifle-volunteer movement grew rapidly, as the Volunteer Force, and by the end of the century had enrolled well over 200,000.

== Works ==
On 18 November 1841 Richards brought out an anonymous pamphlet Oxford Unmasked, in which he denounced abuses in the organisation of the university. It passed through five editions; and its authorship became known. His first dramatic work, published in 1845, was a five-act tragedy Crœsus, King of Lydia. Four other five-act dramas followed: Runnymede in 1846, Cromwell in 1847, Isolda, or Good King Stephen in 1848, and Vandyck, a Play of Genoa, in 1850. In 1846 there appeared his first volume of poems, Death and the Magdalen, and in 1848 another, entitled The Dream of the Soul.

A nationalist and militarist, opposed to the Manchester school of politicians, Richards issued in 1848, in the form of a letter addressed to Richard Cobden, a denunciation of the "peace-at-any-price party", under the title of Cobden and his Pamphlet considered. Another volume was Britain Redeemed and Canada Preserved, anticipating a railway between the Atlantic and the Pacific. Poems, Essays, and Opinions (2 vols.), and Essays and Opinions (2 vols.) consisted of writings from The Mirror of the Time. He brought out, in 1854, a collection of lyrics called The Minstrelsy of War.

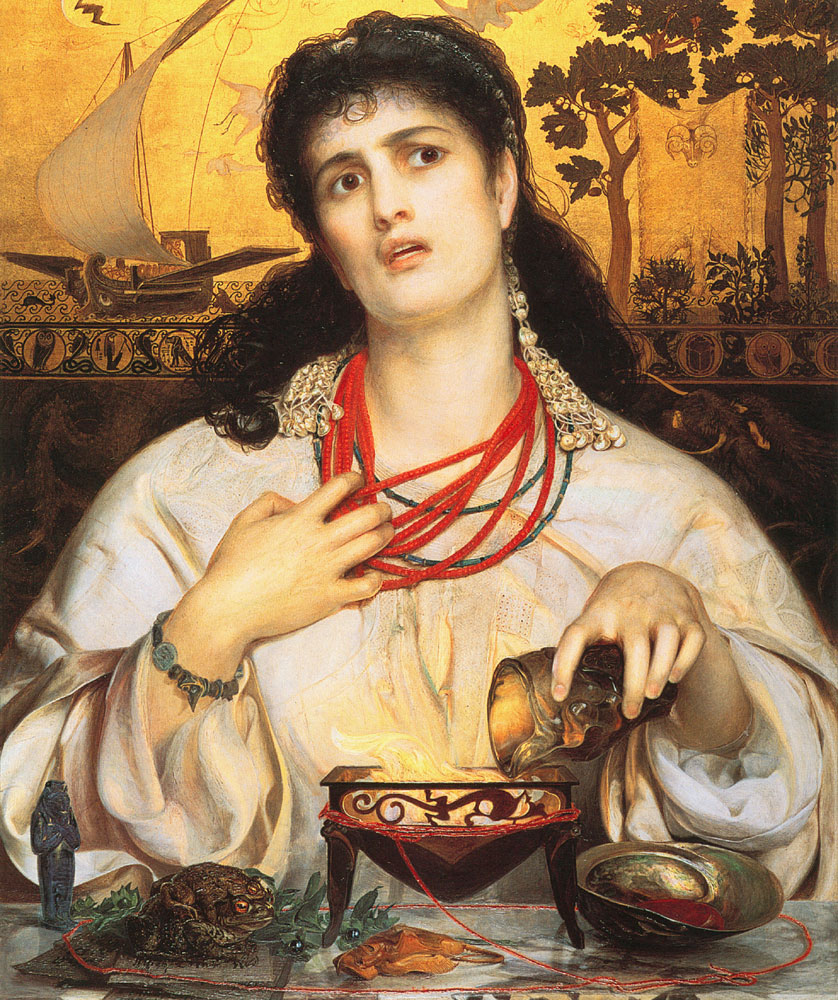
Medea (1868) by Frederick Sandys.

In 1869 Richards published Medea, a poetic rhapsody on the picture by Frederick Sandys. In 1871 his only novel So very Human was published, with a title suggested by a phrase from Charles Dickens. Besides the five dramas above, Richards produced four others. One of these, his tragedy of Norma, based on the libretto of Vincenzo Bellini's opera, was performed for the first time on 5 February 1875 at Belfast, with Miss Wallis in the title rôle. His other dramatic works, which were not published, were The Prisoner of Toulon, King Pym, or the Great Rebellion, and Love and Patience.

== Notes ==
Media offices
Preceded by James Grant	Editor of the Morning Advertiser; 1870–1876	Succeeded by N. de la Fleuriere
