= Lower Chicksgrove =

Hamlet in Wiltshire, England

Coordinates: 51.0694°N 2.0438°W

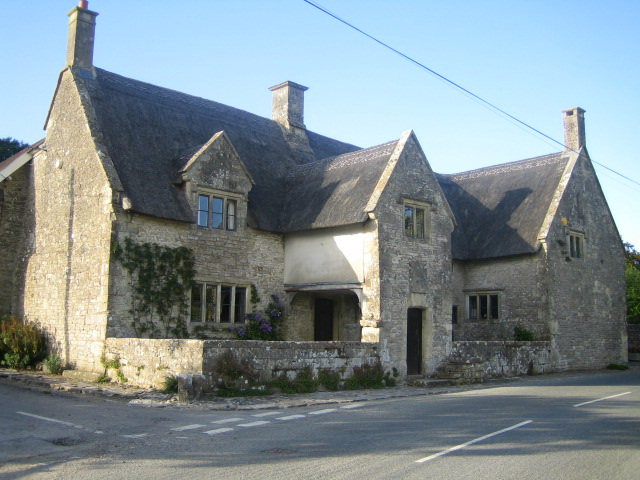
- Chicksgrove Manor

- Location within Wiltshire
- OS grid reference: ST9693130067
- Civil parish: Sutton Mandeville
- Unitary authority: Wiltshire
- Ceremonial county: Wiltshire
- Region: South West
- Country: England
- Sovereign state: United Kingdom
- Post town: Salisbury
- Postcode district: SP3
- Dialling code: 01722
- Police: Wiltshire
- Fire: Dorset and Wiltshire
- Ambulance: South Western
- UK Parliament: Salisbury

Lower Chicksgrove is a hamlet on the north bank of the River Nadder in the south of the county of Wiltshire, England, within the Vale of Wardour. It is about 2 miles (3.2 km) east of Tisbury and 10 miles (16 km) west of Salisbury.

The settlement is recorded in the 12th century as Chicksgrove and a nearby settlement as Stoford; Chicksgrove was first recorded as Lower Chicksgrove and Stoford as Upper Chicksgrove in the later 19th century. Most of the settlement at Lower Chicksgrove in the later 18th century was along a north–south lane, west of the crossing of the Tisbury-Fovant and Chilmark-Ebbesbourne Wake roads, where the farmsteads belonging to Tisbury manor stood.

Chicksgrove Manor, which is the largest of these to survive, is said to have been occupied by the Davies family from the 16th to 18th centuries, and was the birthplace of the lawyer, poet, and political writer Sir John Davies (1569-1626) who became Attorney General of Ireland. The Grade II* listed manor house, in rubble stone under a thatched roof, has 14th-century origins.

For local government purposes, Lower Chicksgrove is part of the civil parish of Sutton Mandeville, having been transferred from Tisbury parish in 1986.

Chicksgrove Quarry, a quarry south of the river extracting Chilmark stone, was part of Chicksgrove manor but is now in Tisbury parish.

The 2009 film Morris: A Life with Bells On was partly filmed at the Compasses Inn which is south of the river, on the road to Sutton Mandeville in a hamlet marked on some maps as Chicksgrove.
