= Chiselbury =

Iron Age hillfort in Wiltshire, England

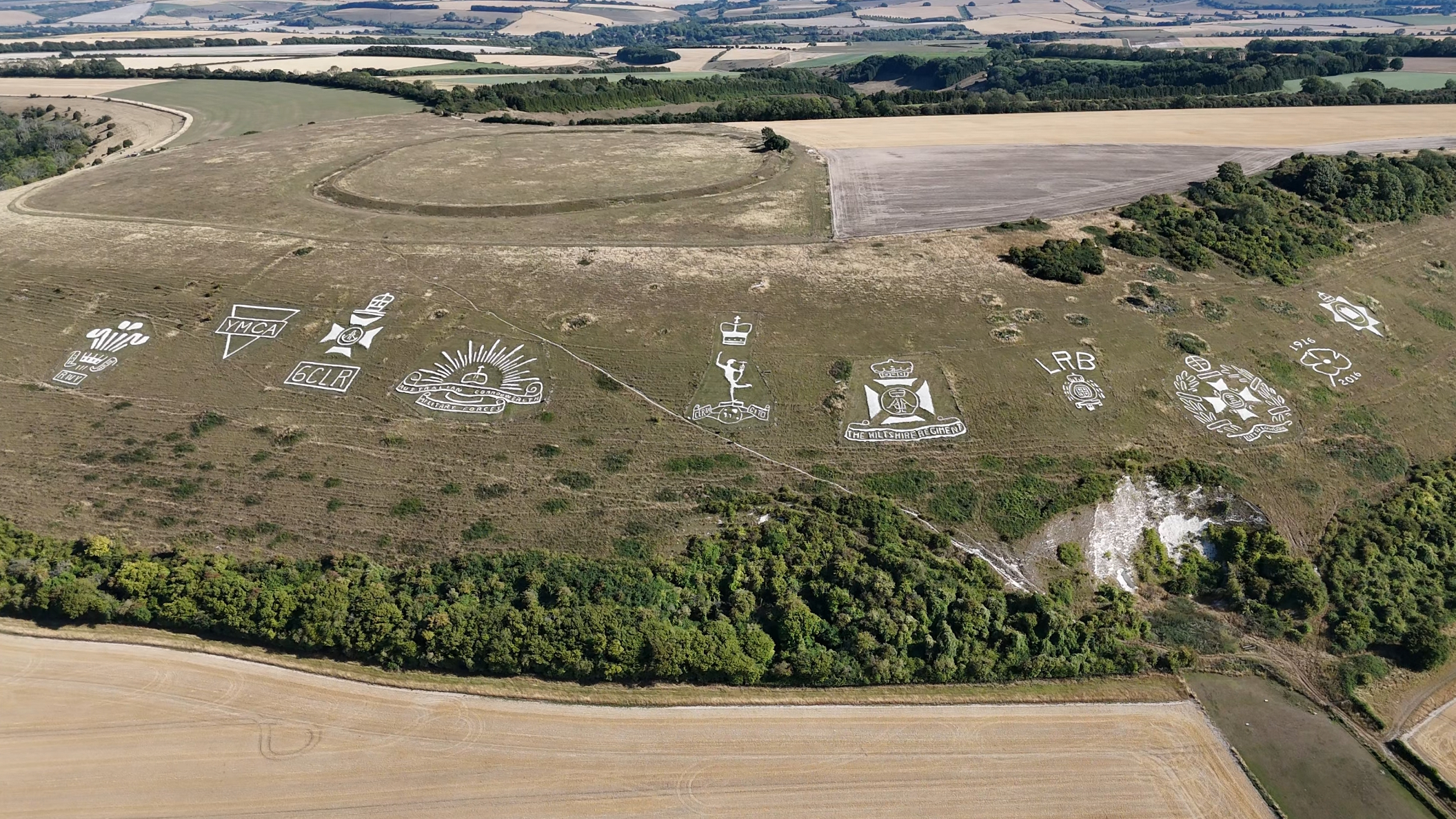
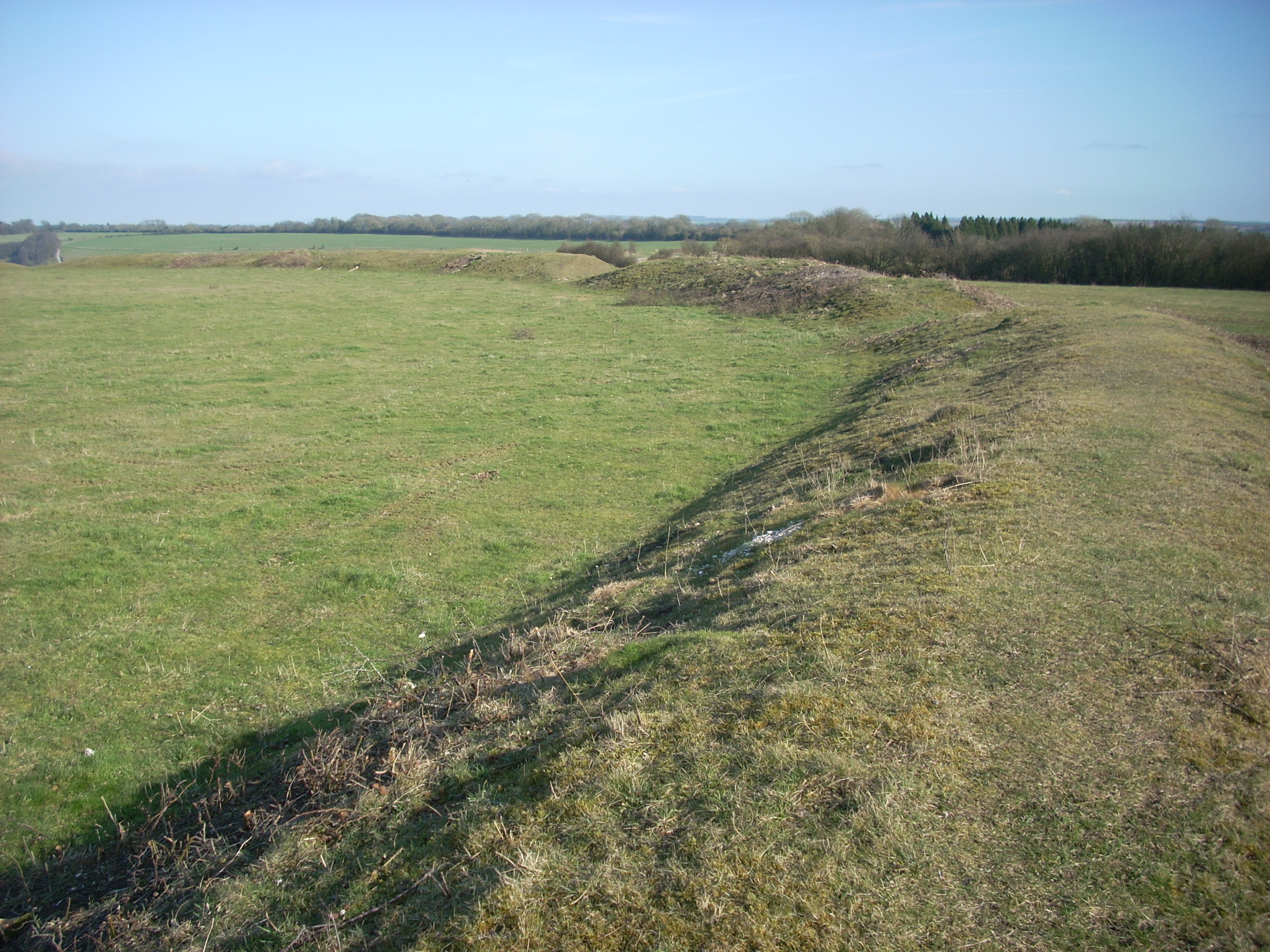
- Chiselbury (the circular feature) above the Fovant Badges Part of the rampart Chiselbury

- Location within Wiltshire
- 51.0522°N 1.9757°W
- Periods: Iron Age
- Location: Wiltshire, England

Site notes
- Area: 10.5 acres (4.2 ha)
- Public access: yes

Chiselbury is the site of an Iron Age univallate hillfort in Wiltshire, England. The hillfort is sub-circular in plan, and encloses an area of approximately 10.5 acres (460,000 sq ft). It is defined by an earthen rampart up to 3.6 metres (12 ft) in height and an external ditch, up to a maximum of 1.6 metres (5.2 ft) in depth. A gap in the south-eastern side of the rampart, and a corresponding causeway across the ditch, is thought to be the original entrance and is associated with a small D-shaped embanked enclosure, which is apparently visible on aerial photographs. Although the enclosure has subsequently been degraded by ploughing, it is still apparent as a series of low earthworks.

Limited archaeological investigation of the interior of the hillfort in the early 20th century failed to find any direct traces of occupation. However, outside of the fort some Iron Age pottery and a lead spindle whorl were found. In addition, two Roman coins, one of which dated to the reign of Emperor Constantine I, were said to have been found within the central area. An Iron Age sword and scabbard were also found on the nearby trackway which runs along the ridge top.

The hillfort is abutted on both its northern and southern sides by embanked ditches or cross dykes. Their precise function is unknown but the manner in which they cut the ridge suggests that they were intended to prevent movement along it. The Northern Cross dyke, 90 metres (300 ft) in length, ran from the ditch of the hillfort across the top of the ridge before continuing part way down its northern slopes. Although visible in 1928, the section between the hillfort and the edge of the ridge has subsequently been infilled by ploughing, but survives as a buried feature. The Southern Cross dyke, which survives as a discontinuous series of banks and ditches, (sections of which are filled in but survive as buried features) is a total of 180 metres (590 ft) in length. It travels roughly south-south-east from the D-shaped enclosure, down the southern slope of the ridge, and into the base of a valley.

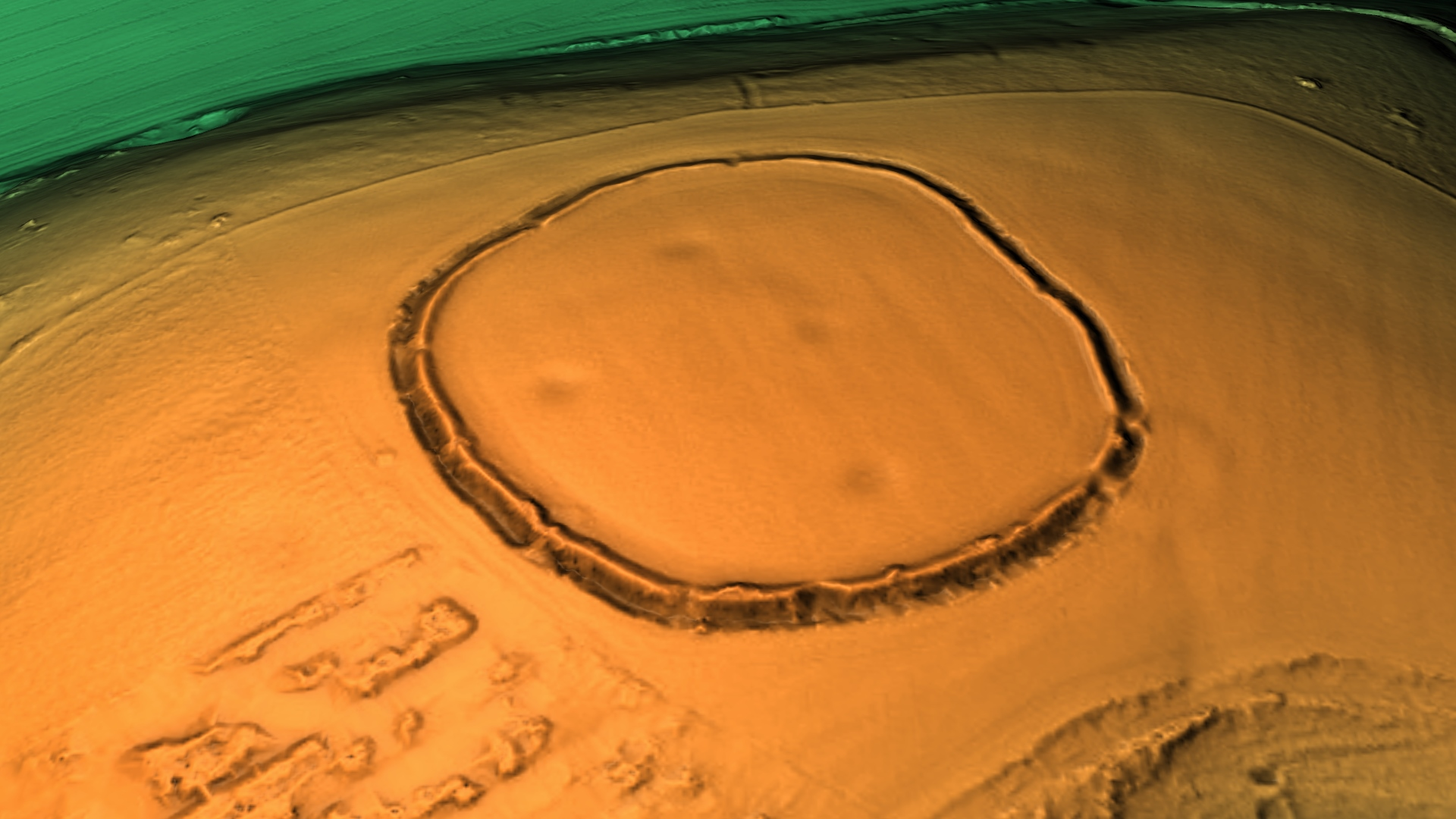
3D view of the digital terrain model

An aerial photograph from 1928 clearly shows the southern cross dyke continuing as a buried feature beneath a trackway which runs along the ridge top, indicating that the trackway came into use after the cross dyke was constructed. An Anglo-Saxon charter also mentions 'the ridgeway' suggesting that the trackway was in use by at least the early medieval period. Referred to as the 'Ten Mile Course' by Dr. Stukeley in 1776, in the medieval and post-medieval periods the trackway was the main route from Wilton to Shaftesbury. By the 18th century it had become a turnpike road, and a map dated to 1773 depicts a toll house immediately to the south of it. The remains of the former toll house structure are visible today as a series of earthworks representing a building platform with a small enclosure immediately to its east.

The site, including the cross dykes, is a scheduled monument.

Today, the site is also known for the Fovant Badges, a number of regimental badges cut into the chalk of the hill on its northern flank. These were created by soldiers garrisoned near Fovant during the First World War, and are clearly visible from the A30 which runs through the village.

== Location ==
The site is at grid reference SU018281, to the south-east of the small village of Fovant, in the county of Wiltshire. The hill has a summit of 201m AOD. There are public footpaths and bridleways to the east and south of the site.

== See also ==
- List of hillforts in England
