= James Grant (newspaper editor) =

British author and newspaper editor

- Born: 1802; Elgin, Moray, Scotland
- Died: 23 May, 1879 (aged 76–77); London, England
- Occupation: Newspaper editor

James Grant (1802 – 23 May 1879) was a British author and newspaper editor.

Grant was born in Elgin, Moray. helped to found the Elgin Courier in 1827, editing it until 1833. Moving to London, he worked on the Standard, the Morning Chronicle and the Morning Advertiser. He also edited the London Saturday Journal (1839–1841) and Grant's London Journal (1841–1842). From 1850 to 1871 he edited the Morning Advertiser. Calvinist in religion, he edited the Christian Standard from 1872. He died in London in 1879.

== Works ==
- Random recollections of the House of Lords from the year 1830 to 1836 including personal sketches of the leading members, 1836
- The great metropolis, 1836
- The bench and the bar, 1837
- Metropolitan pulpit; or, Sketches of the most popular preachers in London, 1839
- Travels in town, 1839
- Walks and wanderings in the world of literature, 1839
- Portraits of public characters, 1841
- Lights and shadows of London life, 1842
- Joseph Jenkins; or, Leaves from the life of a literary man, 1843
- Impressions of Ireland and the Irish, 1844
- Paris and its people, 1844
- Pictures of popular people, or, Illustrations of human nature, 1846
- Pictures of life. The dwellings of the poor, 1855
- The controversy on important theological questions : between the "Eclectic Review", the Rev. Newman Hall, Rev. Thomas Binney, ... on the one side, and Mr. James Grant, editor of the "Morning Advertiser" on the other, 1856
- Who is right, and who wrong? : correspondence between the Rev. Thomas Binney and Mr. James Grant (of the Morning advertiser) on new aspects of the controversy on important theological questions, 1857
- God is love; or, Glimpses of the father's infinite affection for his people / by the author of "The brother born for adversity, 3rd ed. 1858
- The comforter; or, The Holy Spirit in his glorious person and gracious work, 1859
- Our heavenly home : or, glimpses of the glory and bliss of the better world, 1859
- Personal visit to the chief scenes of the religious revivals in the North of Ireland, ca.1859
- Gleams of glory from the celestial world, 1860
- Sources of joy in seasons of sorrow, 1860
- The glorious Gospel of Christ: considered in its relation to the present life, 1861
- God's unspeakable gift; or, Views of the person and work of Jesus Christ, 1861
- Sketches in London, 1861
- The foes of our faith, and how to defeat them; or, The weapons of our warfare with modern infidelity, 1862
- The dying command of Christ; or, The duty of believers to celebrate weekly the Sacrament of the Lord's Supper, 1863
- Grace and glory; or, The believer's bliss in both world. 1863
- Steps and stages on the road to glory, 1865
- The hymns of heaven : or, the songs of the saints in glory, 1867
- The divinity of Christ : demonstrated by proofs drawn from the book of Revelation, 1867
- Seasons of solitude; or, Moments of meditation on the things of eternity, 1868
- The religious tendencies of the times; or, How to deal with the deadly errors and dangerous delusions of the day, 1869
- Memoirs of Sir George Sinclair, Bart., of Ulbster, 1870
- The newspaper press; its origin--progress--and present position, 3 vols, 1871-2
- The Plymouth brethren: their history and heresies, 1875
- Popish versions of the scriptures and the British and Foreign Bible Society, 1877
- Meditations on the loving words of our loving Lord and Saviour, 1877

Media offices
Preceded by John Scott	Editor of the Morning Advertiser; 1850–1870	Succeeded by Alfred Bate Richards
