= London Saturday Journal =

Weekly periodical (1839–1842)

The London Saturday Journal was a general interest magazine publishing short fiction and non-fiction pieces. Established in 1839, it was published in London in the Victorian era. The magazine was published by William Smith and James Grant was its editor for a time. During its existence the magazine had four volumes, the last of which was issued in 1842.
