= Fovant Badges =

World War I memorial in Fovant, Wiltshire, England

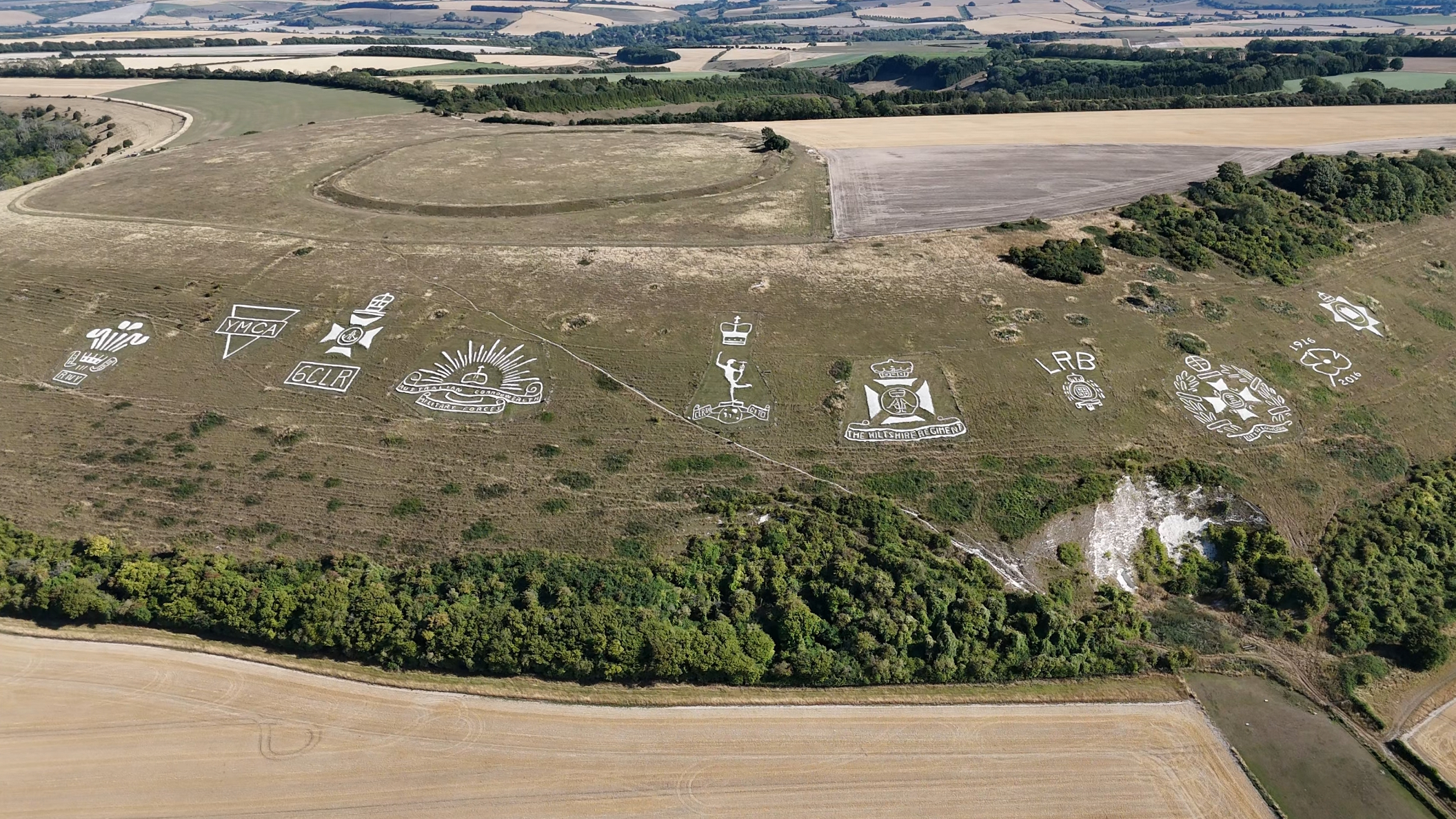
Aerial view in August 2025, showing all 10 badges; above them is Chiselbury, a circular Iron Age feature

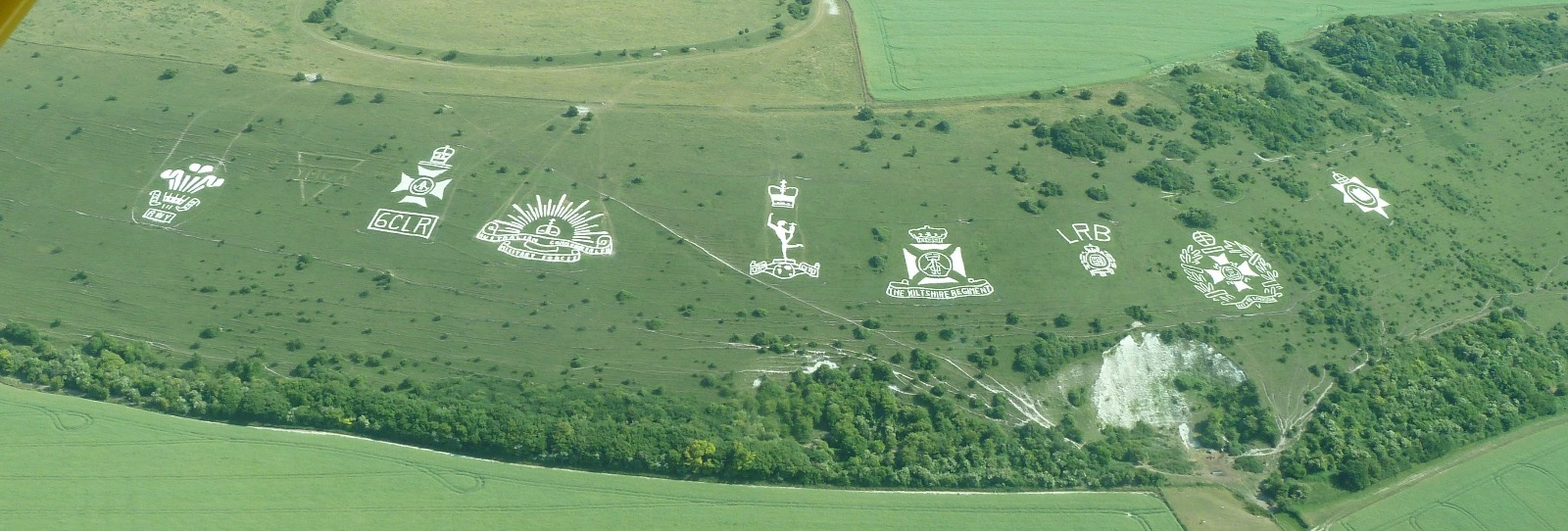
Aerial view in June 2010, before the YMCA badge was renewed

The Fovant Badges are a set of regimental badges cut into a chalk hill, Fovant Down, near Fovant, in south-west Wiltshire, England. They are between Salisbury and Shaftesbury on the A30 road in the Nadder valley, and are approximately 1/2 mile (800 m) south-east of Fovant village. They were created by soldiers garrisoned nearby, and waiting to go to France, during the First World War; the first in 1916. They can be seen from the A30 which runs through the village. Nine of the original twenty remain, and are scheduled ancient monuments and recognised by the Imperial War Museum as war memorials.

== Construction and upkeep ==
After the outlines were cut into the grass-covered hillsides, they were refilled with chalk brought from a nearby slope, up to 50 tons per badge. The badges took an average fifty men six months to complete.

The Fovant Badge Society holds an annual Drumhead Service which is attended by the Australian High Commissioner, local mayors and members of parliament. These services fund the upkeep of the badges.

== The badges ==
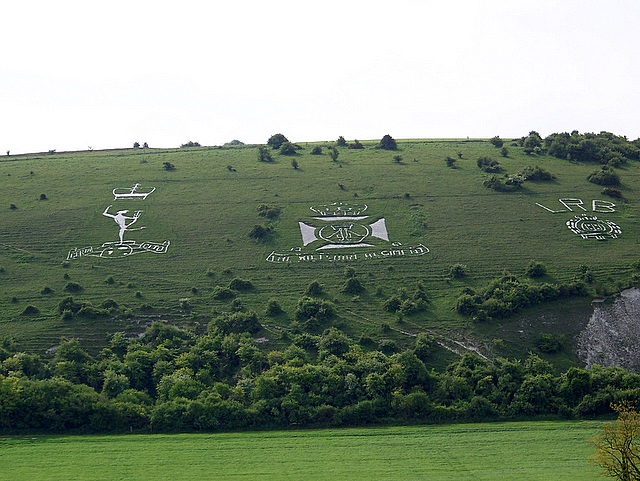
(May 2009) From left: The Royal Corps of Signals, The Wiltshire Regiment and The London Rifle Brigade

=== Current badges ===
Reading left to right (north-east to south-west), the badges at Fovant are:

1. Royal Wiltshire Yeomanry (only central part remaining)
2. YMCA, restored in 2018.
3. 6th (City of London) Battalion, London Regiment (City of London Rifles) (claimed to be the first of the badges cut here)
4. Australian Commonwealth Military Forces (the largest, 51 m × 32 m)
5. Royal Corps of Signals (cut in 1970 to commemorate the Corps' 50th anniversary)
6. Wiltshire Regiment (added in 1950)
7. 5th (City of London) Battalion, London Regiment (London Rifle Brigade)
8. 8th (City of London) Battalion, London Regiment (Post Office Rifles)
9. Remembrance poppy, added in 2016 to commemorate the centenary of the first badge
10. Devonshire Regiment

=== Lost badges ===
Several of the lost badges were short-lived, small and crudely constructed.

1. Royal Army Service Corps
2. Royal Army Medical Corps, possibly on the site of where Royal Wiltshire Yeomanry is now.
3. Machine Gun Corps
4. Queen Victoria's Rifles
5. 35th Training Battalion
6. 'Dingo'
7. Post Office Rifles 'POR' letters, possibly there prior to the current Post Office Rifles figure.
8. 7th Battalion of the City of London Regiment (there is also a figure for this regiment in Sutton Mandeville)
9. 9th Royal Berkshire Regiment
10. 37th Training Battalion
11. Voluntary Aid Detachment

=== Nearby badges ===
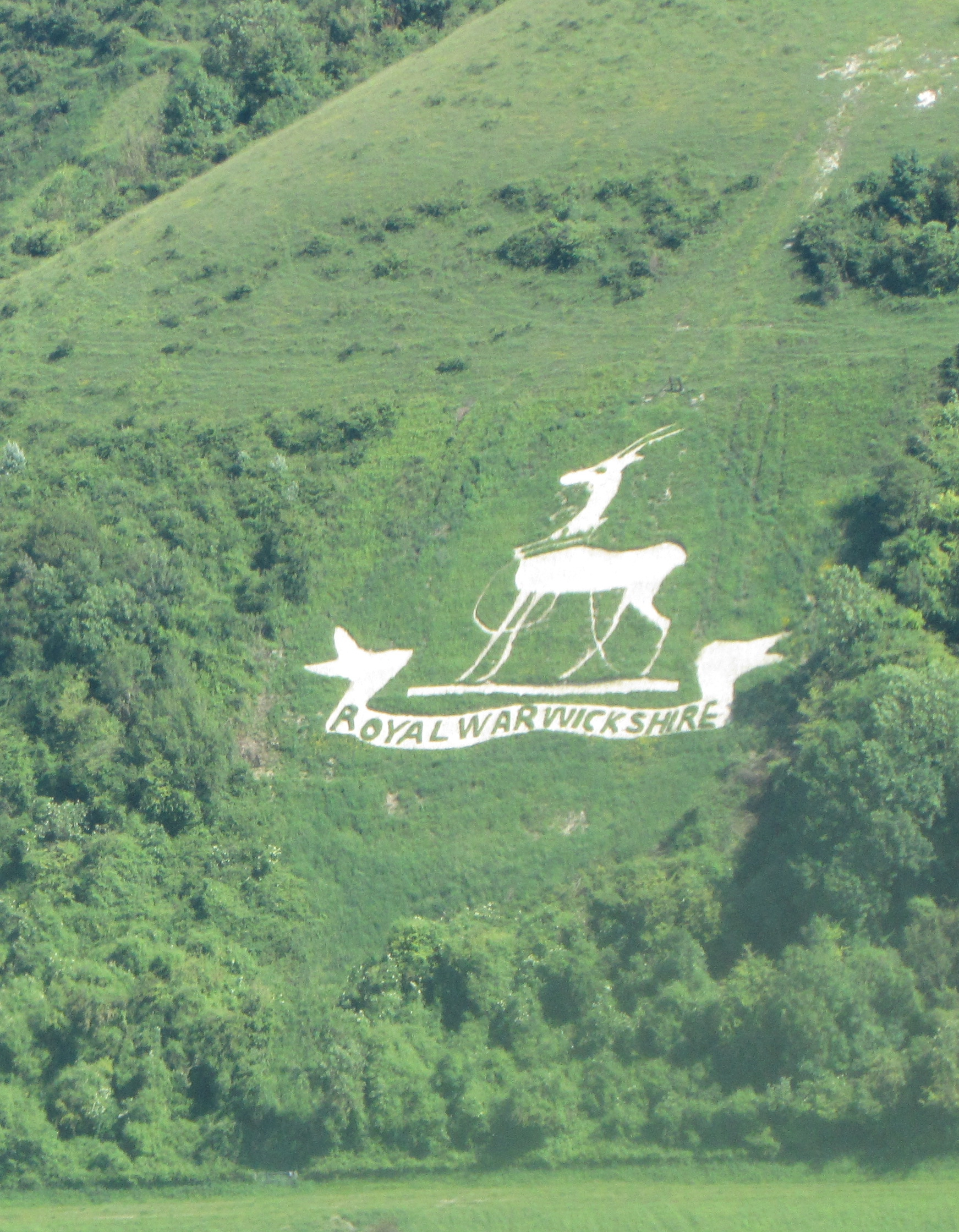
Badge of the Royal Warwickshire Regiment on Sutton Down

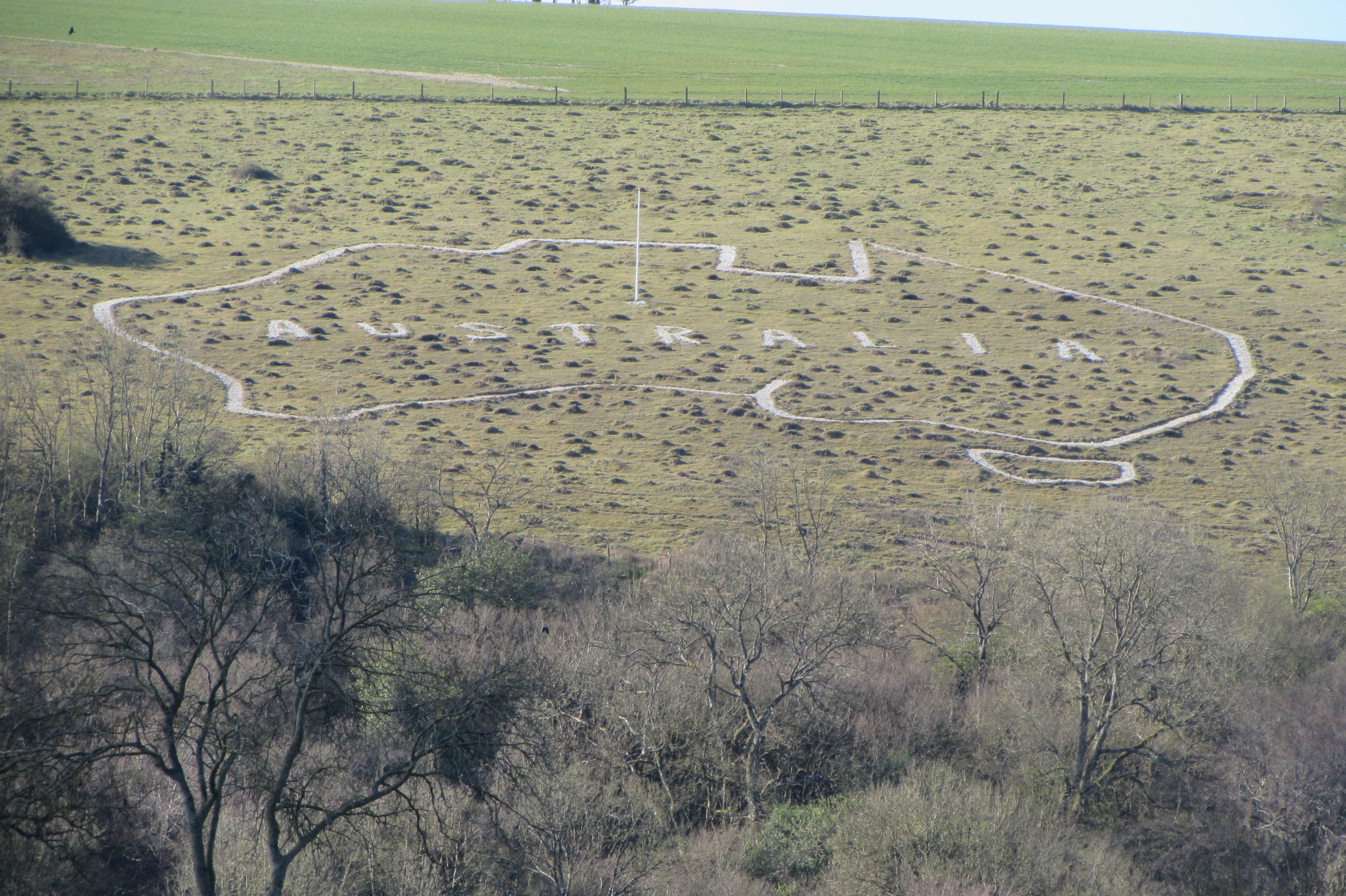
Map of Australia on Compton Downs

- The previously unrestored military badge at Sutton Down of the Royal Warwickshire Regiment was restored during 2017 and spring 2018 by volunteers of the Sutton Mandeville Heritage Trust. It was supported by a grant from the National Lottery and the restored badge was inaugurated on 3 May 2018 by Prince Edward, Duke of Kent, Colonel-in-Chief of the Royal Regiment of Fusiliers, the successor to the Royal Warwickshire Regiment. (51.042847°N 2.024854°W)
- The nearby badge of 7th Battalion, The London Regiment remains unrestored. (51.042226°N 2.022386°W)
- An outline map of Australia on Compton Down was created by Australian troops garrisoned in Hurdcott Camp in the fields below, while training and awaiting transport to the battlefields. It is a scheduled monument. After more than 20 years of neglect it was restored during 2018/19 by a local voluntary group called the Map of Australia Trust (MOAT) founded by Helen Roberts. A remembrance service was held on the map on 25 April 2019, Anzac Day, to mark the restoration and to honour the Australian troops who had been accommodated locally. The service was attended by over 100 people including the Lord Lieutenant of Wiltshire, Sarah Troughton, the deputy Australian High Commissioner, Matt Anderson, and travelling from Australia, the daughter of a soldier who had been at Hurdcott Camp recovering from war wounds. (51.061816°N 1.939990°W)
- On Lamb Down, on the north side of the A36 between Codford and the Deptford interchange and about 9 miles north by west of Fovant, is a cutting of the Australian Commonwealth Military Force badge. It is less detailed than the one at Fovant. It was cut in 1916–1917. (51.064944°N 1.79738°W)
- Near Barford St Martin, at the eastern end of the Fovant Encampment, was formerly the Finsbury Rifles badge. Little is known of this figure.
- At Bulford Camp is the Bulford Kiwi, another military hill figure (though not a badge).

== See also ==
- Battalion Park in Calgary, Alberta, Canada
- List of hill figures in Wiltshire
