= The Publican =

British pub trade publication

The Publican logo

The Publican was a weekly magazine for the UK licensed trade.

The Publican, was launched in 1975, featured news and comment on issues that affect the pub trade as well as jobs and pubs for sale and lease. In 2011, it merged with its main rival Morning Advertiser, to become The Publican's Morning Advertiser.

In 2008 the magazine had an audited circulation of 33,404 and was distributed via subscription and controlled circulation to individual pubs as well as large pub companies and breweries.

== Supplements ==
The Publican also publishes a range of special reports relating to key areas of the pub trade, and produces the Industry Handbook which includes details of all UK pub companies and a suppliers' directory.

== Website ==
The Publican’s website was launched in 2001 and featured news, blogs, a beer guide, photo galleries, pubs for sale and lease, job vacancies and a suppliers directory. The website had about 75,000 monthly unique users (January 2009).

== Editorial campaigns ==
In 2008 The Publican ran Proud of Pubs week, in which people were encouraged to celebrate the positive impact the pub trade has in the UK. It has also campaigned against alcohol pricing in supermarkets and ran training sessions on the smoking ban, and regularly spoke for the industry in the national media.

== Events ==
The Publican organised events catering to the licensed trade, which included:

- The Publican Awards
- The Publican Food and Drink Awards
- Proud of Pubs Week
- The Publican Pub Golf Tournament
- The Publican Directors Club

== About the staff and publisher ==
At the time of the merge with the Morning Advertiser, the editor was Caroline Nodder. The publishing director was Tony Arnold. The Publican employed about 17 staff and was published by United Business Media.

It was based at UBM's head office at Ludgate House, 245 Blackfriars Road, London SE1 9UY.

== See also ==
- List of food and drink magazines
