= Morning Advertiser =

British pub trade publication

- Editor: Ed Bedington
- Publisher: William Reed
- Language: English
- Website: morningadvertiser.co.uk
- ISSN: 2047-2056

Morning Advertiser is an online pub trade news publication in the UK. It is one of the oldest news publications in the world, beginning as a newspaper in 1794 and being published in hard copy until 2020. In 2011, William Reed Ltd, bought The Publican from United Business Media and merged the two titles to form The Publican's Morning Advertiser, a printed magazine with a news website. The merger returned its original name to the Morning Advertiser in July 2016. As of April 2020, the printed magazine has been suspended and all content has been published on the website www.morningadvertiser.co.uk, which attracts 143,371 unique users per month.

== History ==
The Morning Advertiser was first published in 1794 by the London Society of Licensed Victuallers. It was devoted to trade interests, rather than to the support of a political party. Its circulation, however, fostered by the society, was, in the middle of the 19th century, second only to that of The Times.

Circulation grew steadily in the middle decades of the nineteenth century. In 1836, it was 4,500 and, by 1854, had grown to 7,600.

Charles Dickens was an early contributor and journalist, broadcaster and Labour Party communication director Alastair Campbell worked as a reporter on the paper early in his career. Founded in 1794 as The Publican's Morning Advertiser, it was the UK's oldest continuously produced paper. In 1858 the paper became the first newspaper to subscribe to Reuters' news service.

== Editors ==
Franklin
1828: John Anderson
John Sheridan
John Scott
1850: James Grant
1870: Alfred Bate Richards
1876: N. de la Fleuriere
1877: Thomas Hamber
1882: Thomas Wright
1894: Frank Doney
1902: Hamilton Fyfe
1904: G. W. Talbot
1914: A. B. Fraser
1914: H. C. Bysshe
1924: Albert Edward Jackson
1928: H. Bennett
1930s: F. W. Millman
1947: Eric Hopwood
1953: Donald Quick
1956: Leslie Forse
1971: Terry Cockerell
1993: Kim Adams
2000: Andrew Pring
2009: Paul Charity
2011: Rob Willock
2015: Ed Bedington

== Events ==
The Morning Advertiser hosts The Great British Pub Awards, The Publican Awards, MA Leaders Club, Top 50 Gastropubs, Top 50 Cocktail Bars and Top 50 Boutique Hotels

== Awards ==
The Morning Advertiser's former publisher, Tim Brooke-Webb won the title Publisher/Business Manager of the Year at the Professional Publishers' Association Awards 2012 for his work on the title.

== See also ==
- List of food and drink magazines
