= Emma Gaggiotti Richards =

Italian painter

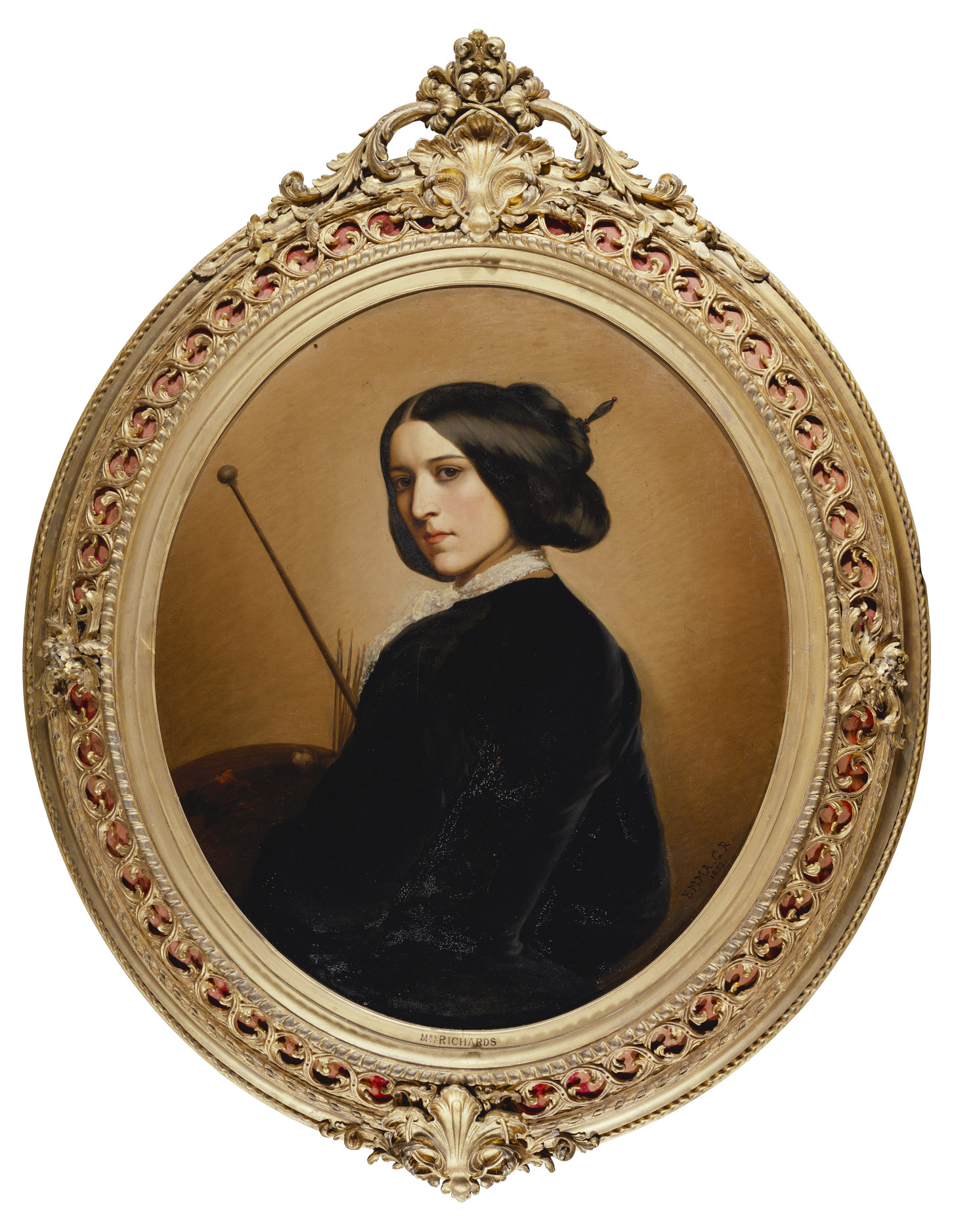
- Born: Emma Camilla Angela Maria Gaggiotti; 1825; Rome, Papal States (now Italy)
- Died: 1912 (aged 86–87); Velletri, Italy
- Education: Nicola Consorti
- Known for: painting
- Spouse: Alfred Bate Richards (m. 1849)

Emma Gaggiotti Richards (1825 – 1912) was an Italian painter who was active in the United Kingdom. She completed five paintings for Queen Victoria and Prince Albert.

== Life ==
She was the daughter of Camillo and Angelina Gaggiotti. Born in Rome in 1825, she grew up in Ancona. She was taught to paint by Nicola Consorti. Her father, Camillo Gaggiotti was the minister of war in Rome.

On 15 February 1849 she married the journalist Alfred Bate Richards.

In 1850 Prince Albert gave three of her paintings, Faith, Hope, and Charity to his wife Queen Victoria. It is thought that the Queen saw the artist's self-portrait exhibited in 1851 at the Royal Academy and commissioned a second self-portrait which she gave to Prince Albert for Christmas in 1853. The following year Richards returned to Italy where she continued to paint. One of her works was a portrait of Alexander von Humboldt. From 1865 to 1904 she was in Florence.

Richards moved to Velletri in 1904 and died there in 1912.

== Legacy ==
She has five paintings in the Royal collection and three of those, Faith, Hope, and Charity, are exhibited in the Horn Corridor at Osborne House. Another painting of hers, of Adelaide Proctor, is in the National Portrait Gallery in London. An 1855 portrait of Alexander von Humboldt, formerly in the collection of the Corcoran Gallery of Art, was at that institution's dissolution accessioned by the National Portrait Gallery.
