= John Wyndham (cricketer) =

English cricketer and British Army officer

Personal information
- Full name: John Reginald Wyndham
- Born: 8 April 1870; Sutton Mandeville, Wiltshire, England
- Died: 16 March 1933 (aged 62); Wallingford, Berkshire, England
- Batting: Unknown

Domestic team information
- Years: Team
- 1896–1903: Wiltshire

Career statistics
Competition	First-class
Matches	1
Runs scored	28
Batting average	14.00
100s/50s	–/–
Top score	20
Catches/stumpings	1/–
- Source: Cricinfo, 28 June 2019

Lieutenant-Colonel John Reginald Wyndham (8 April 1870 − 16 March 1933) was an English first-class cricketer and British Army officer. Wyndham served in the Wiltshire Regiment from 1890 to 1923, during which he saw action in the Second Boer War and the First World War. While serving in British India he played first-class cricket for All-India.

== Life and military career ==
Born at Sutton Mandeville in Wiltshire in April 1870, Wyndham graduated from the Royal Military College into the Wiltshire Regiment as a second lieutenant in March 1890. He was promoted to the rank of lieutenant in March 1892. While serving in British India in January 1893, he made an appearance in first-class cricket for All-India against Lord Hawke's XI touring team at Allahabad. Batting twice in the match, he was dismissed by Christopher Heseltine in the All-India first-innings for 8 runs, while in their second-innings he was dismissed for 20 runs by Arthur Gibson. Returning to England, he made his debut in minor counties cricket for Wiltshire against Berkshire in the 1896 Minor Counties Championship.

He was promoted to the rank of captain on 10 October 1898, and saw active service in the Second Boer War in South Africa. This war ended in June 1902, but Wyndham stayed in South Africa for another six months, returning to Southampton on the SS Walmer Castle in January 1903. Following the war, Wyndham was in March 1903 appointed adjutant of the 3rd (Militia) battalion of his regiment. During this year, he made two further appearances for Wiltshire in the 1903 Minor Counties Championship. He was promoted to the rank of major in May 1908. He served with the Wiltshire Regiment in the First World War, during which he was captured and spent time as a prisoner of war, for which he was recognised after the war. He was promoted to the rank of lieutenant colonel in August 1918, with seniority antedated to November 1914. He retired from active service in March 1923 and died in March 1933 at Wallingford, Berkshire.
