= William Ferguson Beatson =

Bengal Army officer (1804–1872)

General William Ferguson Beatson
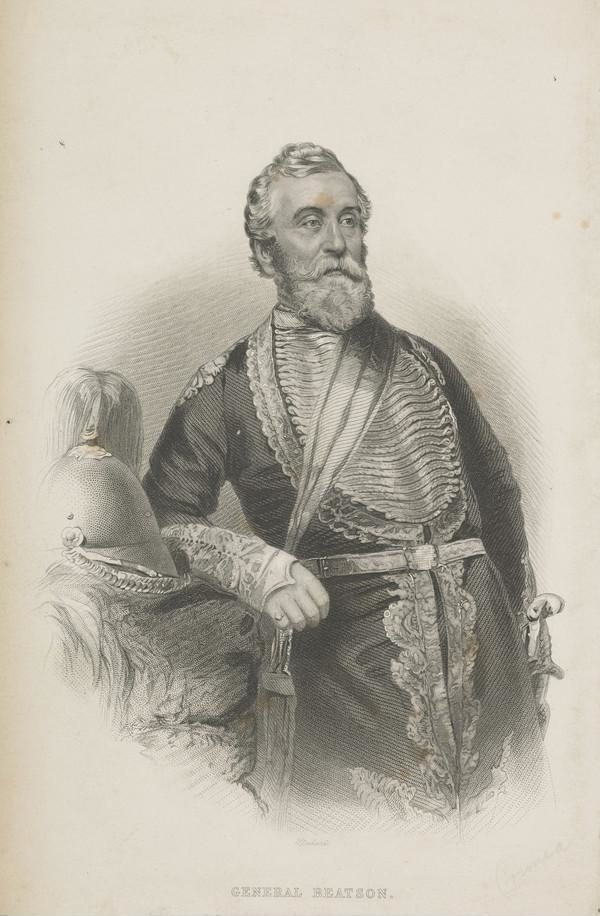
- Engraving of General Beatson
- Born: 25 June 1804
- Died: 4 February 1872 (aged 67)
- Allegiance: East India Company
- Rank: General

William Ferguson Beatson (25 June 1804 – 4 February 1872) was a Bengal Army officer.

== Early life ==
William Ferguson Beatson was born on 25 June 1804, the son of Captain Robert Beatson.

== Military service ==
Beatson entered the Bengal Army in 1820.

He served, while on furlough, with the British Auxiliary Legion in Spain from 1835–36.

He was present at the capture of Jigni in Bundelkund in 1840 and at Chirgong in 1841. In 1844, he served in the Sind campaign, and in 1845 he served under Sir Charles Napier in the Bugti Hills.

He subsequently commanded the Nizam's cavalry and took Rymow from the Rohillas in 1848. During the Crimean campaign of 1854–55, he organised the Bashi-bazouks.. On 18th May 1855, the Dublin Evening Mail reported that it had been informed that seven hundred had already been enrolled.

In the Indian Mutiny, he raised two cavalry regiments known as "Beatson's Horse". Evelyn Wood, later Lieutenant-General Sir Evelyn Wood served with that regiment during that period.

. He later commanded the Allahabad Division in 1866 and the Umbala Division in 1869.

He died on 4 February 1872.

== Beatson in fiction ==
Vivian Stuart, writing as V A ,featured Beatson in her book "Like Victors and Lords". She briefly described Beatson's Scottish birth, military career and participation in the Crimean War.
