= Fovant =

Village in Wiltshire, England

Coordinates: 51.059°N 1.996°W

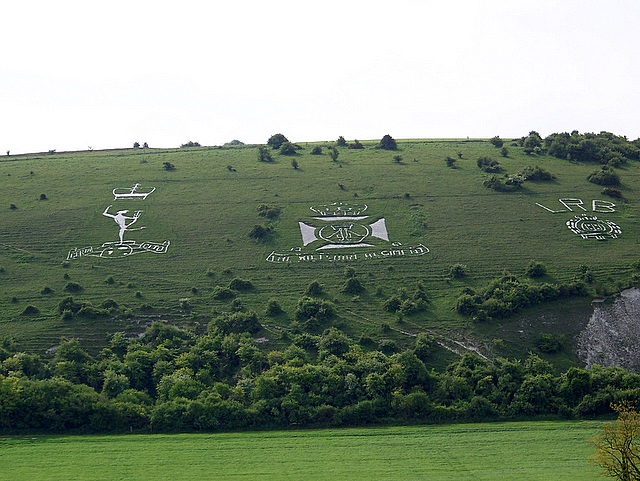
- Three of the Fovant Badges

- Location within Wiltshire
- Population: 669 (2011)
- OS grid reference: SU004289
- Civil parish: Fovant
- Unitary authority: Wiltshire
- Ceremonial county: Wiltshire
- Region: South West
- Country: England
- Sovereign state: United Kingdom
- Post town: SALISBURY
- Postcode district: SP3
- Dialling code: 01722
- Police: Wiltshire
- Fire: Dorset and Wiltshire
- Ambulance: South Western
- UK Parliament: Salisbury
- Website: www.fovantvillage.com

Fovant is a village and civil parish in southwest Wiltshire, England, lying about 9 miles (14 km) west of Salisbury on the A30 Salisbury-Shaftesbury road, on the south side of the Nadder valley.

== History ==
The name is derived from the Old English Fobbefunta, meaning "spring of a man called Fobbe".

The Domesday Book of 1086 recorded a settlement called Febefonte with 22 households, held by Wilton Abbey. The abbey was surrendered to the Crown in 1539, and Fovant was among the villages granted to Sir William Herbert, later Earl of Pembroke. (Herbert was also granted the site of the abbey, where he built Wilton House). The Pembrokes continued as landowners at Fovant until the estate was broken up in 1919.

An elementary school was built in 1847 with places for 100 children, and gained a second classroom in 1875. Children of all ages attended until 1944, when those aged twelve and over transferred to the senior school at Tisbury. By 1958, when the buildings were modernised, there were 58 pupils. In the 1980s children aged 10 and 11 went to a middle school at Tisbury, and falling numbers led to closure of the Fovant school in 1997 when it had 27 pupils.

During World War I a training camp was set up at Fovant which, according to one soldier stationed there, was 'as good a camp as Chiseldon was a bad one'. Owing to the leadership of 'a giant colonel now fairly old', the recruits were well cared for and fed.

== Religious sites ==
=== Parish church ===
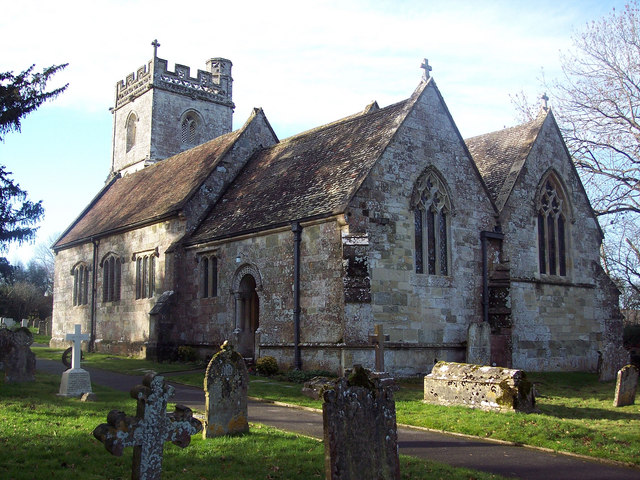
St George's Church

The Church of England parish church of St George dates from the 13th century and has a south doorway taken from a 12th-century building. Much of the church was rebuilt in the 15th century; the tower was built c. 1492 and is surmounted with stone friezes and battlements. In the 16th century the last abbess of Wilton Abbey, Cecily Bodenham, retired to Fovant and is said to have paid for the building or rebuilding of the south aisle.

Restoration in 1863 by T.H. Wyatt included the rebuilding of the chancel and major changes to the interior, including the removal of a musicians' gallery. One of the six bells in the tower is from the 15th century.

The building was designated as Grade II* listed in 1960. Today the parish is part of the Nadder Valley Team Ministry.

=== Chapel ===
A Congregational chapel was completed in 1820 in dressed limestone, and continues in use as Fovant Free Church.

== Military connections ==
During the First World War, temporary camps were built in the Fovant area to handle training and medical treatment of soldiers, and later their demobilisation. The Fovant Military Railway was built in 1915 from Dinton station, passing close to Fovant with a terminus east of the village near the A30. The camps stretched beyond Compton Chamberlayne into Barford St Martin parish, and included Hurdcott Camp which was a depot of the Australian Imperial Force (AIF).

The area is known for several regimental badges cut in chalk into a nearby hill (also being the site of Chiselbury Iron Age hillfort), created by soldiers garrisoned near Fovant.

== Governance ==
The civil parish elects a parish council. It is in the area of Wiltshire Council unitary authority, which is responsible for all significant local government functions.

== Amenities ==
Fovant has a village shop (with post office), a village hall, playing field and playground. At one time with three public houses, Fovant also has a pub called The Greater Good formerly known as the Pembroke Arms.
