= History of Dorset =

History of the English county

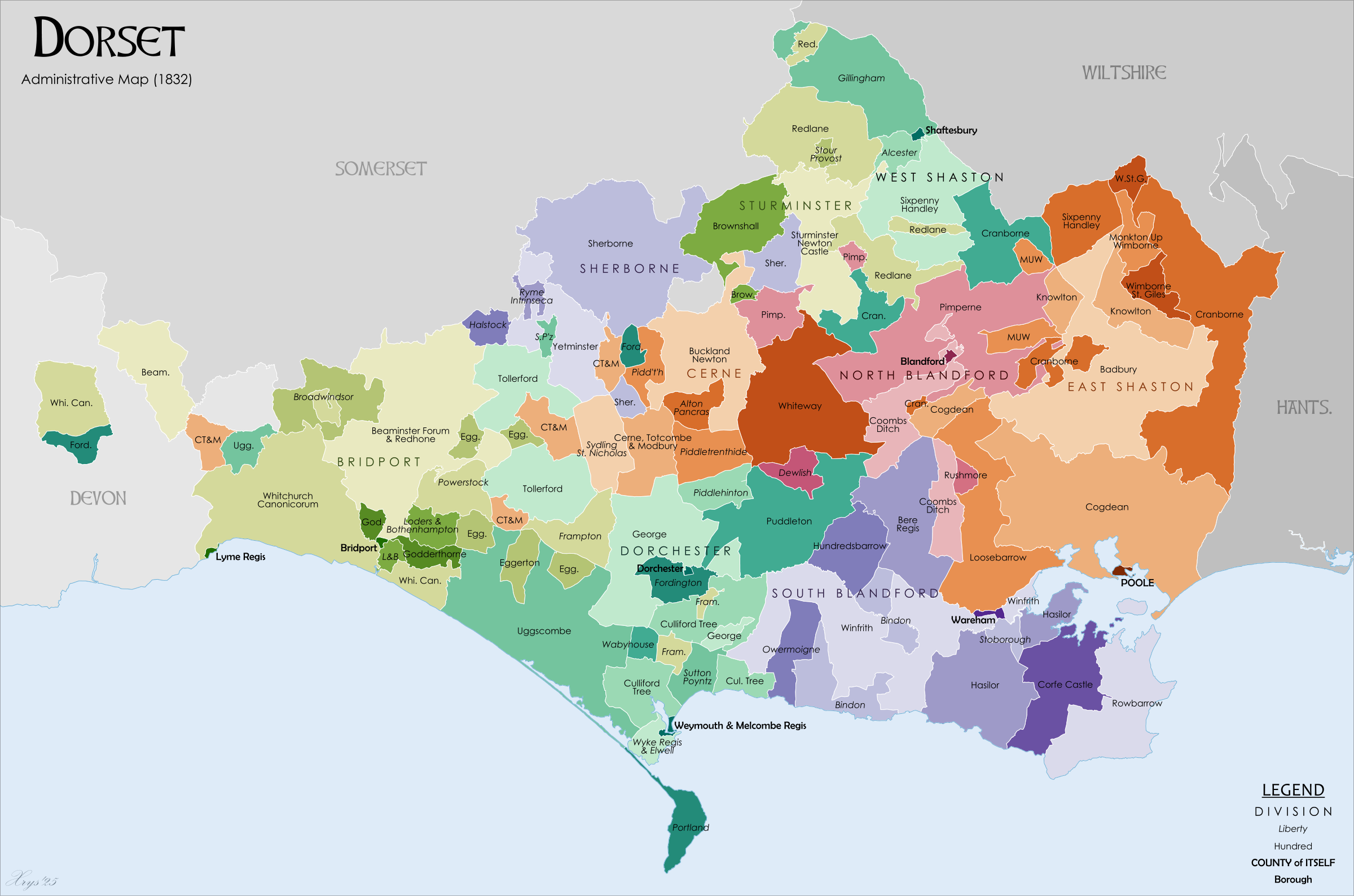
Ancient County of Dorset

Dorset is a rural county in south west England. Its archaeology documents much of the history of southern England, from the earliest Mesolithic settlements and through the Roman, Saxon, and Medieval periods to the present.

== Pre-Roman ==
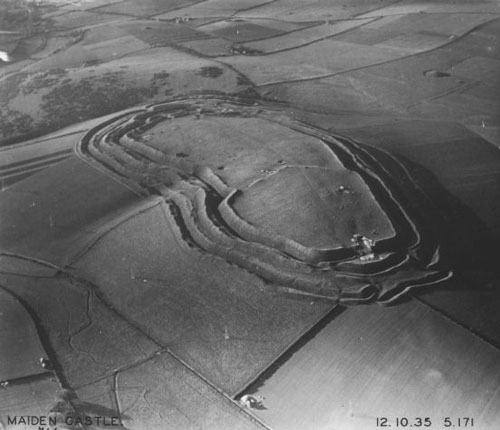
Maiden Castle is one of the largest hill forts in Europe. Photograph taken in 1935 by Major George Allen (1891–1940).

The first known settlement of Dorset was by Mesolithic hunters, who returned to Britain at a time when it was still attached to Europe by a land-bridge, around 12,500 BC. The population was very small, maybe only a few thousand across the whole of Britain, and concentrated along the coast: in Dorset, such places as the Isle of Purbeck, Weymouth, Chesil Beach and Hengistbury Head, and along the Stour valley. These populations used stone tools and fire to clear some of the native oak forest for herding prey. Genetic experiments carried out on a Mesolithic skeleton from Cheddar Gorge (in the neighbouring county of Somerset) have shown that a significant part of the contemporary population of Dorset is descended from these original inhabitants of the British Isles.

This suggests that when a wave of immigrant farmers arrived from the continent in the Neolithic, the indigenous hunter-gatherers were not wiped out, but instead most likely adopted agricultural practices. Further woodland clearances took place at this stage, and also in the Bronze Age, to make way for agriculture and animal husbandry, although where the soils were poor and made permanent cultivation difficult, clearance led instead to the creation of heathland. Neolithic and Bronze Age burial mounds are particularly numerous throughout much of the county.

Dorset's high chalk hills have provided a location for defensive settlements for millennia, with a large number of late Bronze Age but mostly Iron Age hill forts, such as Maiden Castle, Hod Hill, Badbury Rings and Hambledon Hill. The chalk downs were largely deforested during these times, making way for field and pasture. Some of the steeper slopes and hill tops are inaccessible or impractical for arable farming, and there the archaeology is relatively well preserved; the valley floors and broader hills have usually been ploughed, and hence do not have a good record of pre-Roman archaeology, although this does not mean that Iron Age peoples didn't settle there. Indeed, many contemporary theories postulate that hillforts may not have been the main focus of settlement, but served more as a marketplace-cum-stronghold in times of danger, and in fact most of the time, the population was concentrated in the valleys. By the Late Iron Age, the inhabitants of Dorset were minting their own coinage and thriving on trade with Northern Gaul (Armorica, now known as Brittany). However, after Armorica was conquered by Julius Caesar in 56 BC, the trade dried up; the Romans re-arranged trade with Britain to the profit of their allies, the Trinovantes, in Essex. The next century or so until the Roman conquest saw a long drawn-out period of economic retrenchment in Dorset, in parallel with a rising population and a decline in soil quality (much of it had been in cultivation for 4,000 years). By the time of the Roman Conquest, it is likely that a combination of overpopulation and impoverishment of the soil left many people starving, to which bone analysis of skeletons from Bere Regis bears witness; several of the skeletons present ample evidence of numerous distinct episodes of severe malnourishment during childhood.

The Romans record the name of the native British tribe that lived in Dorset as the Durotriges, who were also the tribe of much of Somerset and possibly the New Forest. Sometimes translated as "water dwellers", this name could mean that they were seafarers, but is more likely a reference to the marshy valley of the River Frome which they would have farmed. However, this etymology is unsound, based on the Welsh word dwr meaning water; however the earlier form of the word was dwfr, which suggests an Ancient British ancestor-word *dubro-, not *duro- (this form of the word is preserved in the place-name Dover). Another alternative is "fort-dwellers"; it is known that the Durotriges were still occupying their hillforts at the time of the Roman invasion in 43 AD, whereas in most other parts of Britain they had been abandoned around 100 BC. There is also a Cornish word dur meaning "land" or "earth"; hence the Durotriges might also be "land-dwellers", referring to their already important farming tradition: it is known that they were exporting grain to the Roman Empire in large quantities already by the first century BC. The etymology of the first element is thus far from certain, although the second element definitely means "dwellers" (Cornish tre, "town", tregez "have lived"; Welsh tref "town").

== Roman ==
The Romans landed in Dorset at Poole Harbour and the Fleet and moved inland, while other groups travelled west from Old Sarum and Winchester. At Abbotsbury on the Fleet the Romans quickly took the hill fort, Abbotsbury Castle, bloodlessly before moving on to Maiden Castle. There is some evidence of a struggle at Maiden Castle and Badbury Rings but current opinion amongst archaeologists is that these, and Hod Hill, also fell with ease. There is, however, a find of 130 skeletons at Spetisbury which show that the invasion was not entirely peaceful.

Dorset has many notable Roman artefacts, particularly around the Roman town Dorchester, where Maiden Castle was taken early in the Roman occupation. In the grounds of the County Council offices is a Roman house with well preserved mosaic floors and an aqueduct fed by waters of a tributary of the Frome impounded behind an earthen dam, with a covered timber-lined channel of some nine km; the dam gave way and the aqueduct was abandoned unexpectedly early, in the mid-2nd century. Roman roads radiated from Dorchester, following the tops of the chalk ridges north west to Ilchester near Yeovil, and east to Badbury Rings where it forked to Winchester, Bath and a particularly well-preserved route running north east to Old Sarum near Salisbury, as well as tracks to the many small Roman villages around the county. In the Roman era settlements moved from the hill tops to the valleys, with Roman finds, such as the famous Hinton St Mary mosaic, being found in the vales. In the Isle of Purbeck a long-settled Iron Age site at Worth Matravers was reorganised late in the Roman period to grow grain for the legion, with a grain-parching granary floor heated with a hypocaust. By the 4th century the hilltops had been abandoned.

== Post-Roman ==
Although there were Jutish and later Saxon people in the Southampton area from the 5th century, the Britons seem to have successfully resisted their expansion into future Dorset for a long period. One of the key battles (Mount Badon) between the Britons and Saxons may have been fought at Badbury Rings, though this is disputed. There may have been a Saxon raid at Bindon in 614, though the location is not certain.

== Saxon ==
A large defensive ditch on Cranborne Chase in the north east of the county, Bokerley Dyke, dated to 367, appears to have been fortified and - along with the blocking of the Roman Road at Ackling Dyke, to have delayed the Saxon conquest of Dorset, with the Romano-British remaining in Dorset for 200 years after the withdrawal of the Roman legions. Evidence suggests that Dorset had been largely conquered by the West Saxons by the beginning of the reign of Caedwalla in 685. The inhospitable coastline prevented an invasion from the sea. When the Roman road across Cranborne Chase was rebuilt in the 6th century the Saxons advanced into Dorset. The Romano-British retreated, constructing another defence, Combs Ditch, which also fell within a century. It is thought that the Saxons captured east Dorset in the mid-7th century and west Dorset shortly afterwards, but the details are not known.

Dorset was initially part of Saxon Wessex, with the first record of Dorset being in 841. Coenred, the sub-king of Dorset at the end of the 7th century, was father of King Ine. St Martin's church at Wareham is reputedly the oldest in Dorset but there were many other Saxon foundations including Shaftesbury Abbey and Sherborne Monastery. King Ethelred I (866–871) is buried at Wimborne, while St Cuthberga, abbess of Wimborne, died in 725. Gillingham is first mentioned in a 10th-century charter.

Aldhelm was the first bishop of the Diocese of Sherborne, created in 705 AD. This covered the part of Wessex "west of Selwood".

In 876 King Alfred the Great trapped a Danish fleet at Arne then drove it out, 120 ships being wrecked at Studland. Corfe Castle in 978 saw the murder of King Edward the Martyr, whose body was taken first to Wareham and then to Shaftesbury.

== Middle Ages ==
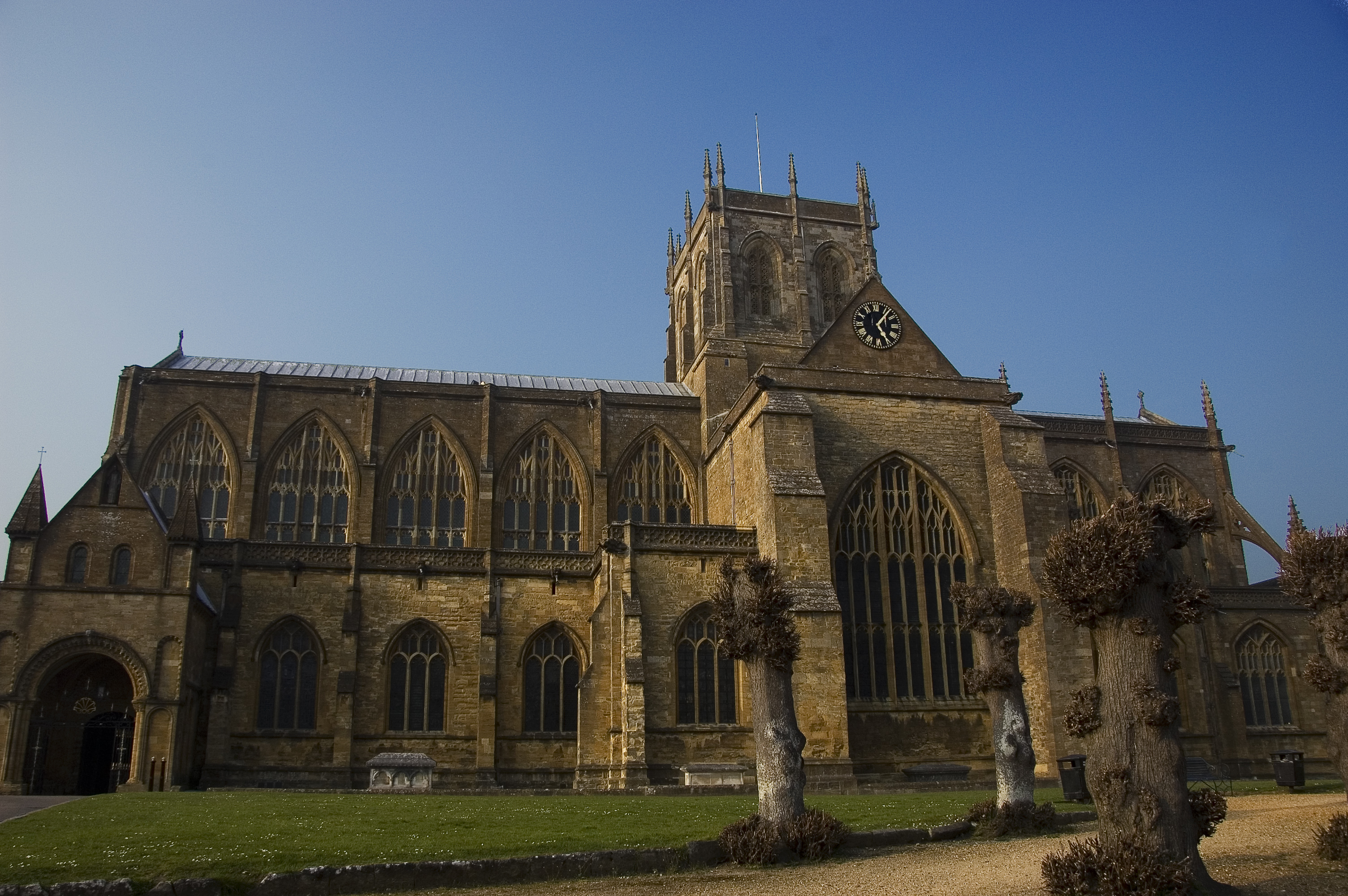
During the Middle Ages monasteries like Sherborne Abbey were the biggest power in Dorset

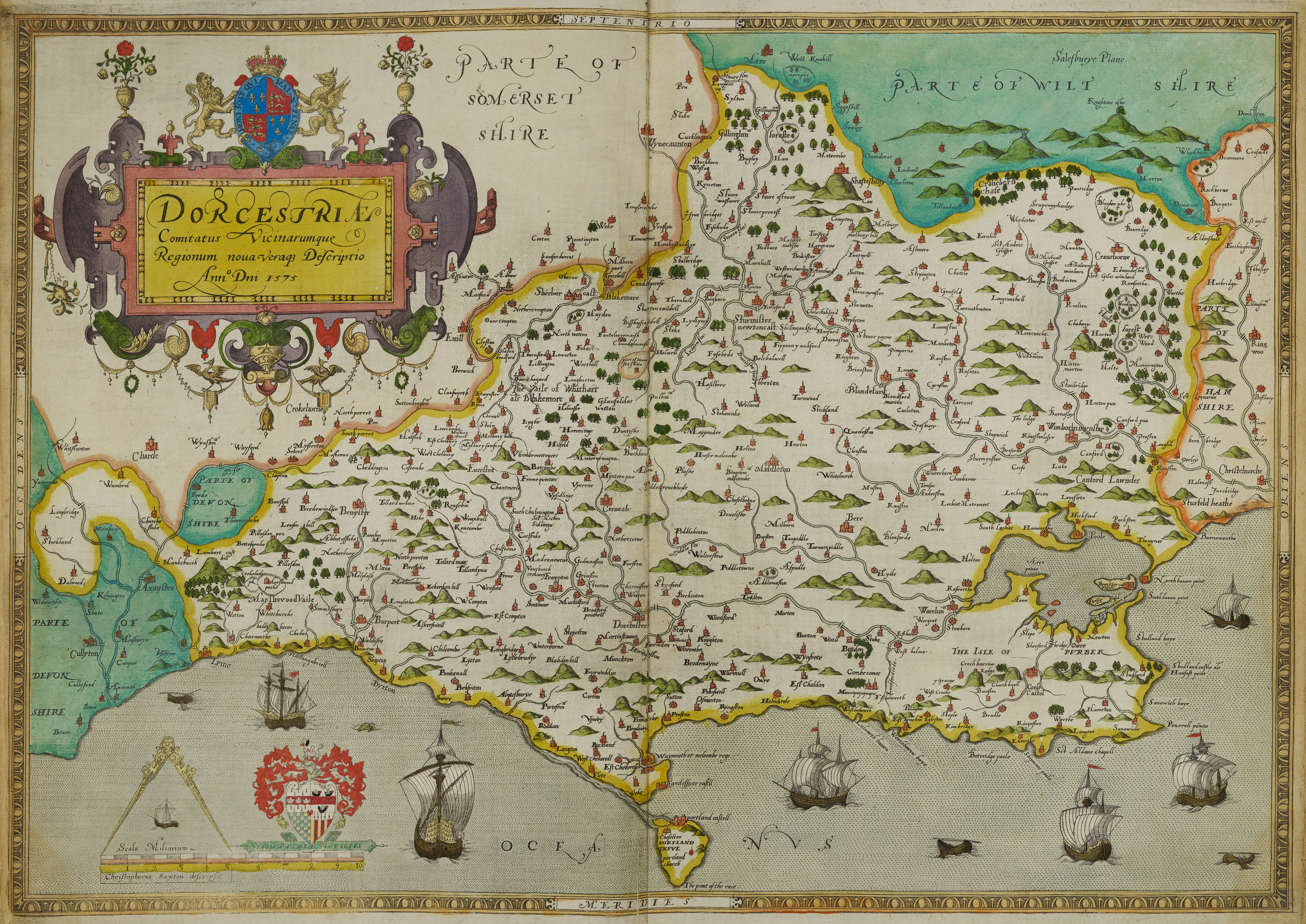
Atlas of Dorset by Christopher Saxton from 1575

The Domesday Book documents many Saxon settlements corresponding to modern towns and villages, mostly in the valleys, and there have been few changes to the parishes since. Over the next few centuries the settlers established the pattern of farmland which prevailed into the nineteenth century. Many monasteries were also established, which were important landowners and centres of power.

A number of military events took place in Dorset during The Anarchy of the 12th century, and this gave rise to the defensive castles at Corfe Castle, Powerstock, Wareham and Shaftesbury. In 1348 the Black Death came to England, probably landing in ports along the south coast, including Melcombe Regis now part of Weymouth. The then busy port was one of the first towns to experience the epidemic which went on to wipe out a third of the population of the country. In the 14th and 15th centuries the hilltop villages shrank further, and many disappeared altogether. Throughout the Medieval period, Dorset was popular amongst the nobility, including a number of kings, for its hunting estates, such as Gillingham and Sherborne. A number of deer parks still remain in the county.

The 12th and 13th centuries saw much prosperity in Dorset and the population grew substantially as a result. In order to provide the extra food required, additional land was enclosed for farming during this time. The quarrying of Purbeck Marble, a limestone that can be polished, brought wealth into the county and provided employment for stonecutters and masons. Large amounts of the stone were used in the construction of Salisbury Cathedral. The trade continues today but has declined since the 15th century when alabaster from Derbyshire became popular.

Another mediaeval industry, which continues today, was the manufacture of rope. Bridport was particularly famous for its rope, so much so that the phrase 'stabbed with the Bridport dagger' was commonly used to describe someone who had died at the hands of the hangman. Bridport rope was also purchased in large quantities by the Royal Navy. In the 15th century, Henry VII decreed that all hemp within a 5-mile radius of the town was to be reserved for the navy.

== Early Modern ==
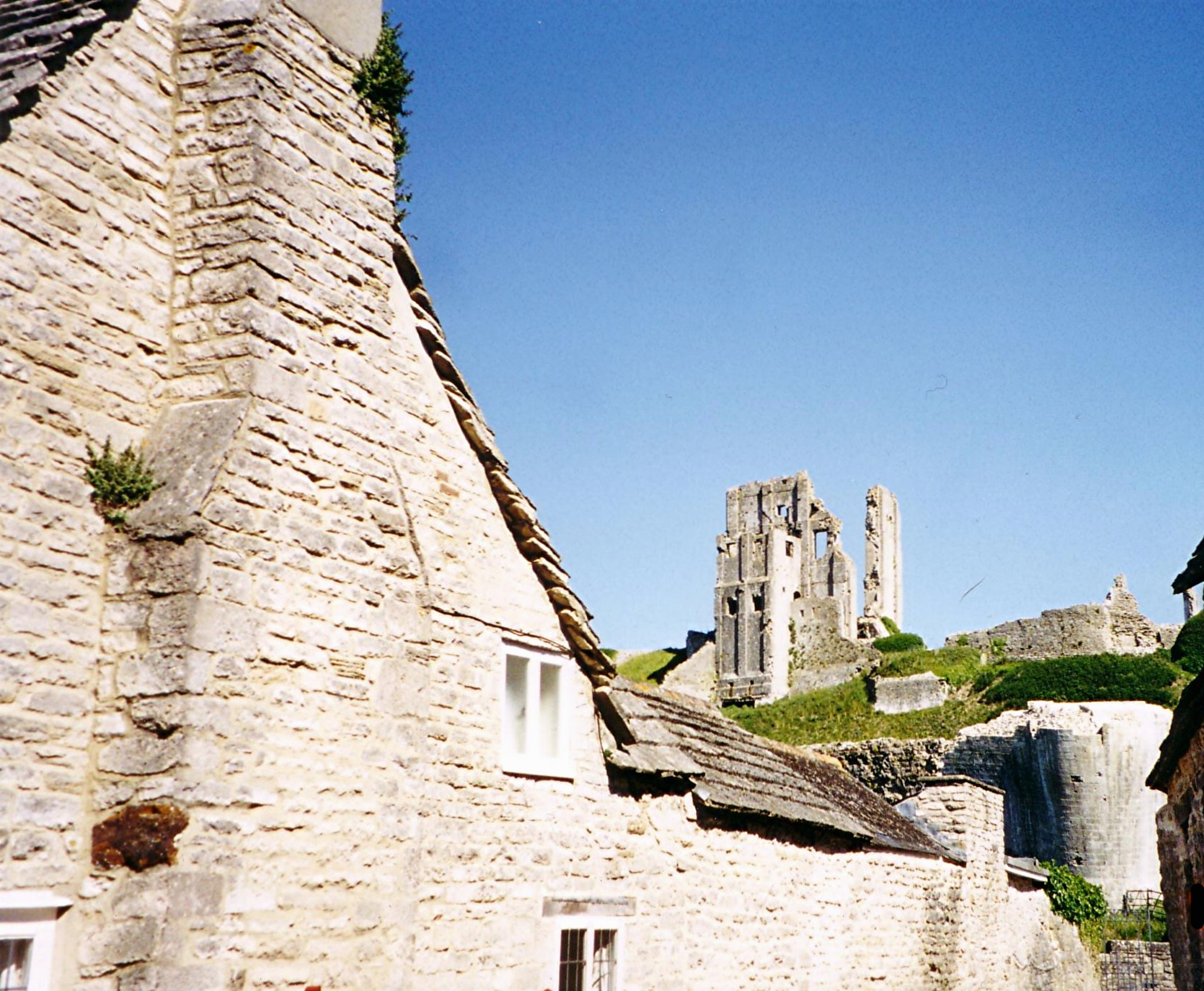
Royalist stronghold Corfe Castle was destroyed in the English Civil War

From the Tudor to Georgian periods farming specialised and the monastic estates broke up, leading to an increase in population and settlement size. The Dissolution of the Monasteries closed the abbeys at Sherborne, Shaftesbury, Milton Abbas, Abbotsbury and Cerne Abbas, though both Sherborne and Milton abbeys were saved from destruction. In 1588, eight ships from Dorset assisted in the destruction of the Spanish Armada. The flagship San Salvador still lies at the bottom of Studland bay. Sir Walter Raleigh later settled in Sherborne and served as MP for Dorset.

In the 17th-century English Civil War Dorset had a number of royalist strongholds, such as Sherborne Castle and Corfe Castle, which were ruined in the war. The 1642 Battle of Babylon Hill was indecisive. Corfe had already been successfully defended against an attack in 1643 but an act of betrayal during a second siege in 1646 led to its capture and subsequent slighting. The residents of Lyme Regis were staunch Parliamentarians who, in 1644, repelled three attacks by a Royalist army under King Charle's nephew, Prince Maurice. Maurice lost 2,000 men in the assaults and his reputation was severely damaged as a result. The largest civil war battle in Dorset was not fought between Cavaliers and Roundheads however. The Dorset clubmen, a group of angry civilians who were annoyed by the disruption caused by the war, had no allegiance to either side. In 1645 some 5,000 of them gathered at Shaftesbury to do battle with Parliamentarian troops. Armed only with clubs and a variety of farming implements, they were easily dispersed. A smaller force of 2,000 or so regrouped on Hambledon Hill and were again routed. Many were taken prisoner and this was effectively the end for the organisation. The

In 1685, James Scott Monmouth, the illegitimate son of Charles II, and 150 supporters landed at Lyme Regis. After the failed Monmouth Rebellion, the 'Bloody Assizes' took place in Dorchester where over a five-day period, Judge Jeffreys presided over 312 cases. 74 were executed; 29 were hanged, drawn and quartered; 175 were deported and many were publicly whipped. In 1686, at Charborough Park, a meeting took place to plot the downfall of James II of England. This meeting was effectively the start of the Glorious Revolution.

During the 18th century the Dorset coast saw much smuggling activity; its coves, caves and sandy beaches provided ample opportunities to slip smuggled goods ashore. In 1747 a notorious gang of armed smugglers broke into the customs house in Poole to reclaim their captured contraband. The production of cloth was a profitable business in Dorset during the 17th and 18th centuries. Blandford became famous for its bonelace and Stalbridge for its stockings. Shaftsbury, Sturminster Marshall, Beamister, Burton Bradstock, Gillingham, Cerne Abbas and Winterbourne Stickland produced a wide variety of materials between them, including sailcloth, linen and even silk. The absence of coal however meant that during the Industrial Revolution Dorset was unable to compete with the large mechanised mills of Lancashire and so remained largely rural. The Tolpuddle Martyrs lived in Dorset, and the farming economy of Dorset was central in the formation of the trade union movement.

== Modern ==
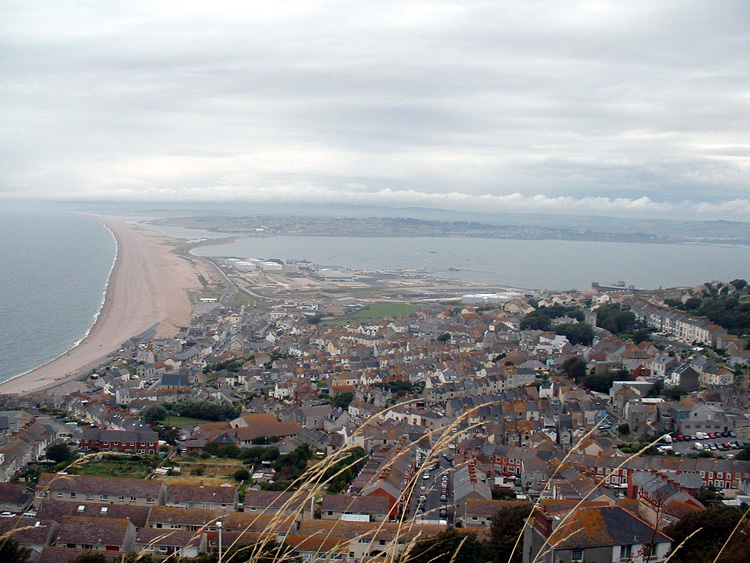
Portland Harbour was an important Royal Navy base in the First and Second World Wars

The Industrial Revolution largely by-passed Dorset, which has remained largely rural. The farming economy, however, provided the spark for the Trade Union movement when, in the 1820s a group of farm labourers formed one of the first unions. In 1832 unions were outlawed and the six men, now known as the Tolpuddle Martyrs, were transported, becoming national heroes to the working classes.

In the 19th century the railways bought increased mobility and communications to the British people. Lines through Dorset include the South West Main Line, from London to Bournemouth, Poole, Dorchester and Weymouth; the Heart of Wessex Line from Bristol to Sherborne, Dorchester and Weymouth; the West of England Main Line from London to Exeter, with stations at Sherborne and Gillingham; and the now dismantled Somerset and Dorset Joint Railway from Bath to Bournemouth. There were also a number of small branchlines, closed in the Beeching axe, such as those to Bridport and Swanage. The Swanage Railway has been reopened as a heritage railway.

During World War I and II Dorset, located on the English Channel, was both a target and important to the Royal Navy. The large Portland Harbour, built at the end of the 19th century and protected by Nothe Fort and the Verne Citadel, was for many years, including during the wars, one of the largest Royal Navy bases. British, American and Canadian ships gathered in the harbour and nearby in Weymouth bay before the D-Day landings. Training for the landings also took place in Dorset, at the long sandy beach at Studland. Portland Harbour continued to be used as a Royal Navy and NATO training base until the 1990s. It is now a civilian port and recreation area which was used for the sailing events in the 2012 Olympic Games.

Since the early 19th century, when George III took holidays in Weymouth while ill, Dorset's tourism industry has grown, with the seaside resorts of Bournemouth and Weymouth, the Jurassic Coast and the county's sparsely populated rural areas attracting millions of visitors each year. With farming declining across the country tourism now rivals agriculture as the main economy of the county.

In 1974 the political boundaries of Dorset were modified, incorporating a small area of south west Hampshire which included the towns of Bournemouth and Christchurch. In 1996 Bournemouth and Poole became administratively independent from the county.

In the 2016 United Kingdom European Union membership referendum, Dorset voted in favour of Brexit.

In the 2019 structural changes to local government in England, the ceremonial county of Dorset was changed from consisting of a non-metropolitan county (itself divided into six non-metropolitan districts) and two unitary authorities, into consisting of two unitary authorities. The new unitary authorities in Dorset became; Bournemouth, Christchurch and Poole, consisting of the old unitary authorities of Bournemouth and Poole as well as the non-metropolitan district of Christchurch; and Dorset Council, which merged the five remaining non-metropolitan districts of East Dorset, North Dorset, Purbeck, West Dorset, and Weymouth and Portland, as well as the former county council

== See also ==
- History of England

== Bibliography ==
- Arkell, W.J., 1978. The Geology of the Country around Weymouth, Swanage, Corfe & Lulworth. London: Geological Survey of Great Britain, HMSO
- Blamires, H., 1983. A Guide to twentieth century literature in English. Taylor & Francis. ISBN 978-0-416-36450-7
- Chisholm, Hugh, ed. (1911). "Dorsetshire" . Encyclopædia Britannica. Vol. 8 (11th ed.). Cambridge University Press. pp. 434–436.
- Cullingford, Cecil N., 1980. A History Of Dorset. Chichester: Phillimore & Co Ltd.
- Chaffey, John (2004). The Dorset Landscape, Its Scenery and Geology. Halsgrove House, Tiverton.: Dorset Books. ISBN 1-871164-43-5.
- Cochrane, C., 1969. Poole Bay and the Purbeck, 300BC-1660AD. Dorchester: Longman.
- Davies, G.M., 1956. A Geological Guide to the Dorset Coast, 2nd ed. London: A & C Black
- Draper, Jo (2003). Dorset; The Complete Guide. Wimborne, Dorset: Dovecote Press Ltd. ISBN 0-946159-40-8.
- Dwyer, Jack, 2009. Dorset Pioneers. The History Press ISBN 978-0-7524-5346-0
- Goodwin, Tim, 1996. Dorset in the Civil War 1625-1665. Dorset Books.
- Hilliam, David (2010). The Little Book of Dorset. Stroud, Glos.: The History Press. ISBN 978-0-7524-5704-8.
- Hutchins, John, 1741 (First Edition). History and Antiquities of Dorset. Third edition reprinted 1973.
- Kerr, Barbara, 1968. Bound to the Soil: A Social History of Dorset 1750-1918. London: John Baker.
- Perkins, John W., 1977. Geology Explained in Dorset. London: David & Charles.
- Pitt-Rivers, Michael, 1968. Dorset (A Shell Guide). London: Faber & Faber
- Taylor, Christopher, 1970. The Making of the Dorset Landscape. London: Hodder & Stoughton
- Thistlethwaite, Frank, 1989. Dorset Pilgrims: The Story of West Country Pilgrims Who Went to New England in the 17th Century. London: Barrie & Jenkins.
- West, Ian, 2004. Geology of the Wessex Coast and Southern England, Southampton University, (Accessed between September 2003 and October 2004)
- Wright, John (2003). Discover Dorset, Rivers and Streams. Wimborne, Dorset.: Dovecote Press. ISBN 1-904349-10-2.
- The Buildings of England by John Newman and Nikolaus Pevsner. Page 134. Published by Penguin Books 1972. Reprint 1975. ISBN 0-14-071044-2 (For Abbey Farm House).
