= Badbury =

Badbury as a may refer to one of the following places in England:

- Badbury (hundred), Dorset
- Badbury Hill, Oxfordshire
- Badbury Rings, Dorset
- Badbury, Wiltshire
