= Combs Ditch =

Earthwork in Dorset, England

Coordinates: 50.80568°N 2.18528°W

Combs Ditch (sometimes spelt Comb's Ditch or Combe Ditch) is a linear earthwork on Charlton Down in Dorset, England. Combs Ditch forms the boundary between several parishes in Dorset. The parishes of Charlton Marshall and Spetisbury lie to the north east of Combs Ditch while Winterborne Whitechurch, Winterborne Kingston and Anderson lie to the south west. The earthwork is a scheduled ancient monument.

== Description ==
Combs Ditch lies to the north of the Roman road that ran from Badbury Ring to Dorchester but there is no evidence that it intersected the road. The earthwork consists of a bank with a ditch on the north east side. It was once at least 6.4 kilometres (4.0 mi) long but now only 4.4 kilometres (2.7 mi) is visible. The bank ranges from 5.4 to 8.5 metres (17 ft 9 in to 27 ft 11 in) wide with a maximum height of 2.2 metres (7 ft 3 in). The ditch varies in width from 4.8 to 8.5 metres (15 ft 9 in to 27 ft 11 in).

== Archaeology ==
Excavation found third- or fourth-century Roman pottery lying on the turf line behind the bank probably before its final reconstruction. The limited excavation seems to show an Iron Age boundary ditch being enlarged into a defensive earthwork in the late Roman or post-Roman period. This is similar to the nearby linear earthwork of Bokerley Dyke.
