= Dudsbury Camp =

Iron Age earthwork in Dorset, England

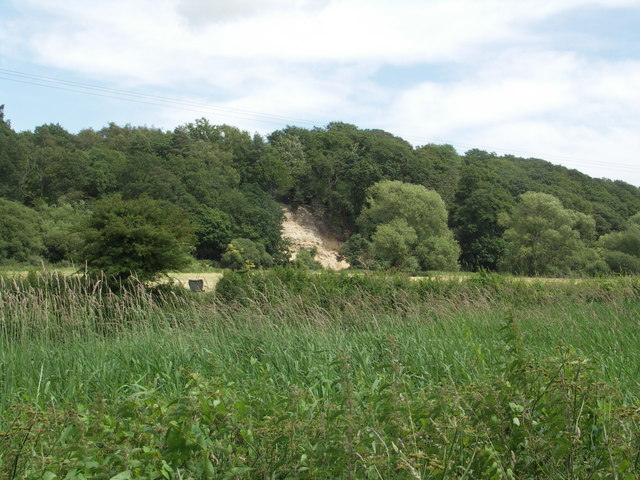
- Dudsbury Camp viewed from the south

- Location within Dorset
- 50.78107°N 1.89144°W
- Type: Hillfort
- Periods: Iron Age
- Location: West Parley
- OS grid reference: SZ077979

Dudsbury Camp (or Dudsbury Rings) is one of a series of Iron Age earthworks in Dorset, starting from Hambledon Hill, and including Hod Hill, Spetisbury Rings, Buzbury Rings, Badbury Rings and Dudsbury Camp. The Iron Age port at Hengistbury Head forms a final Iron Age monument in this small chain of sites. The fort is located near the village of West Parley.

== Name ==
Dudsbury takes its name from a man called Duds or Dudd, a 6th-century Saxon. Domesday records that "Azelin holds Dodsberie of Waleran. Godwin held it in King Edward's time and it was taxed for one hide. There is land to plough which is there, with four bordars, and seven acres of meadow and six of wood, pasture half a league long and five quarterns broad. It was and is worth 20s."

== Description ==
Dudsbury is an Iron Age hillfort situated on the north bank of the River Stour. The defences enclose a semicircular area of about 3 hectares and consist of double ramparts and ditch on the west, north and east sides, with a steep slope to the river on the south side. Much of the outer rampart and ditch has been obliterated or severely damaged. The best preserved portion lies near the southwest corner where the inner rampart stands 1.5 metres above the interior and 4 metres above the bottom of the outer ditch. The outer rampart there rises over 5 metres above the bottom of the ditch. There are four entrances to the hillfort, but probably only the west entrance, and possibly the south entrance, are original.

Limited excavations were conducted by Heywood Sumner in 1921, but little was found except for some Iron Age pottery sherds on the northwest side.

== Later use ==
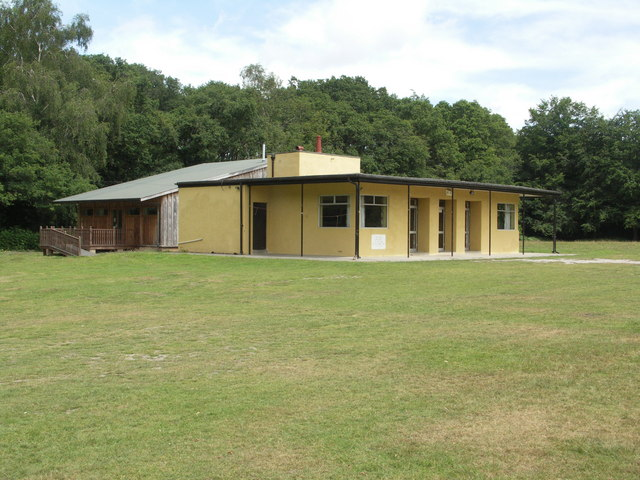
Girl Guide building at Dudsbury

The interior of the hillfort was used for agriculture for many years except for the northeast quadrant which has a house and garden.

In 1930, fourteen acres were secured as a camp site for the Bournemouth Division of the Girl Guides Association from its then owner, Lord Wimborne, who, in sympathy with the scheme, generously parted with the land for a nominal sum. This section is now the Dudsbury Guide Camp. The house and garden in the northeast quadrant is now occupied by the Warden of the Guide Camp.

The Dudsbury Golf Club Hotel and Spa which opened in 2006 announced its permanent closure in January 2024.
