= Shapwick, Dorset =

Village and civil parish in Dorset, England

Coordinates: 50.8175°N 2.0879°W

Shapwick
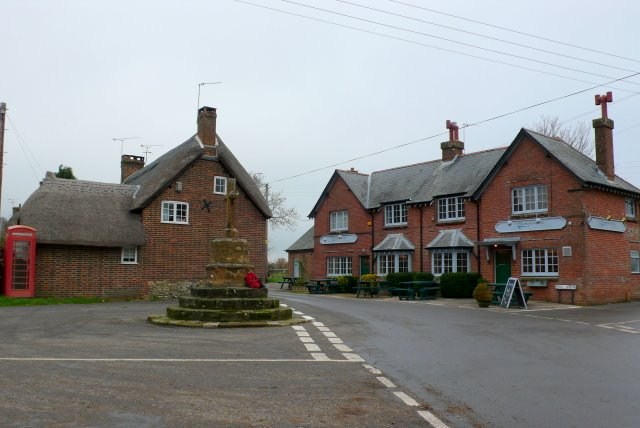
- Shapwick village centre

- Location within Dorset
- Population: 175 (2021 census)
- OS grid reference: ST939020
- Civil parish: Shapwick
- Unitary authority: Dorset
- Ceremonial county: Dorset
- Region: South West
- Country: England
- Sovereign state: United Kingdom
- Post town: Blandford Forum
- Postcode district: DT11
- Dialling code: 01258
- Police: Dorset
- Fire: Dorset and Wiltshire
- Ambulance: South Western
- UK Parliament: North Dorset

Shapwick is a village and civil parish in east Dorset, England, situated on the River Stour 5 mi (8.0 km) south-east of Blandford Forum and 8 mi (13 km) north of Poole. The village had a population of 175 in 2021.

== History ==
Within the parish, about a mile to the north-east of the village, is the Iron Age hillfort of Badbury Rings.

In Roman times there was a Roman fort at Crab Farm, between Shapwick and Badbury Rings. Just to the west of the fort was a small Romano-British town, believed to be that listed in the Antonine Itinerary as Vindocladia.

Shapwick lay on the important Roman Road from Old Sarum to Durnovaria (now High Street and New Road), and the river Stour was forded here, being a major crossing-point in Roman times. This was the highest navigable point on the river Stour, where boats would anchor, and is therefore the likely origin of the name of the village pub - the Anchor - which is just 200m across the meadows from the river.

House numbers above 200 in the High Street contrast with the smaller number of houses there at present. As the village declined, burnt down thatched cottages were not replaced.

In 1983 Shapwick was used as one of the two real life locations for the Doctor Who story The Awakening. The other village used was Martin in Hampshire.

One of its most famous residents was Charles Bennett, who won the 1500 metres at the 1900 Summer Olympics.

=== The Shapwick monster ===
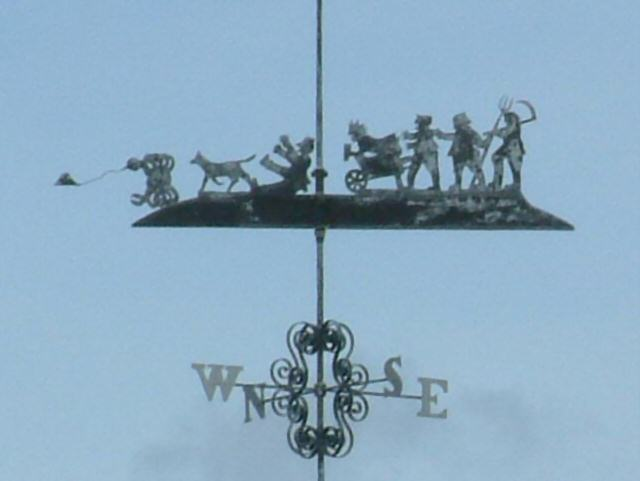
Commemorative weathervane at Crab Farm

A local legend tells how in the year 1706 a travelling fishmonger was one day passing through the village of Shapwick, when, unbeknownst to him, a crab fell off his cart. The fishmonger continued on his journey, but the local villagers, who had never seen a crab before, gathered around the creature, poking it with sticks, believing it to be a devil or monster. The fishmonger (according to one version of the story) eventually returned looking for his lost crab, and when he saw the commotion, picked up the crab and continued on his way to spread the story about the simple folk of Shapwick.

The story was cemented in verse and pictures in 1841 by the artist Buscall Fox, and today the legend is commemorated on a story board on display at the Anchor Inn, and also in the name of Crab Farm, which has a weathervane showing the crab and villagers.

== Governance ==
In the UK national parliament, Shapwick is within the North Dorset parliamentary constituency.

At the lower level of local government, Shapwick has a group parish council shared with Pamphill, with five councillors representing Pamphill, and four for Shapwick.

At the upper level, Shapwick is in the Dorset unitary district. For elections to Dorset Council, it is part of the Stour and Allen Vale ward which elects 1 member.

Historically, Shapwick was in the ancient Badbury Hundred. It was part of Wimbourne and Cranborne rural district from 1894 to 1974, and then in East Dorset district until Dorset became a unitary district in the 2019 structural changes to local government in England.

== Demographics ==
Census population of Shapwick, Dorset parish
Census	Population	Female	Male	Households	Source
1921	304				
1931	282				
1951	232				
1961	214				
1971	230				
1981	180				
1991	200				
2001	190	99	91	79	
2011	199	98	101	83	
2021	175	91	84	83	
