= Hod Hill =

Hillfort in Dorset, England

Highest point
- Elevation: 143 m (469 ft)
- Prominence: c. 68 m
- Coordinates: 50.8951°N 2.2052°W

Geography
- Location: Stourpaine, Dorset, England
- OS grid: ST856106
- Topo map: OS Landranger 194

Hod Hill (or Hodd Hill) is a large hill fort in the Blackmore Vale, 3 miles (5 km) north-west of Blandford Forum, Dorset, England. The fort sits on a 143 m (469 ft) chalk hill of the same name that lies between the adjacent Dorset Downs and Cranborne Chase. The hill fort at Hambledon Hill is just to the north. The name probably comes from Old English "hod", meaning a shelter, though "hod" could also mean "hood", referring to the shape of the hill.

The fort is roughly rectangular (600 by 400 m (2,000 by 1,300 ft)), with an enclosed area of 22 ha (54 acres). There is a steep natural slope down to the River Stour to the west, the other sides have an artificial rampart, ditch and counterscarp (outer bank), with an additional rampart on the north side. The main entrance is at the south-east corner, with other openings at the south-west and north-east corners.

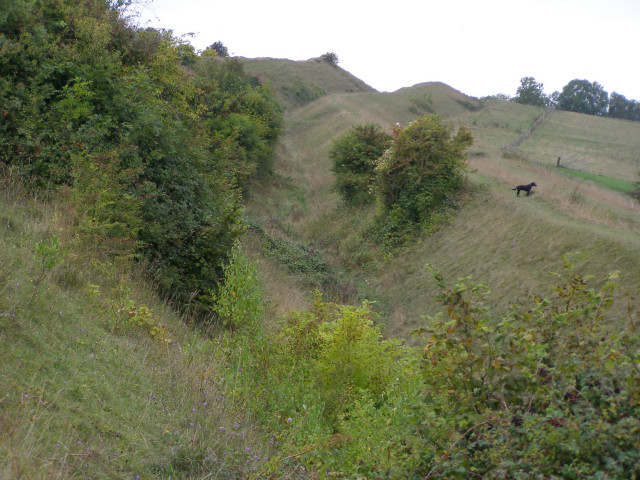
A view of the northern side of Hod Hill with the inner rampart on the left, the ditch in the middle and the outer rampart on the right.

The hillfort was inhabited by the Durotriges in the late Iron Age; whether this is the same tribe who fortified the hilltop in the middle Iron Age (radiocarbon analysis suggests a date of 500 BC for the main rampart) is unknown. There is extensive evidence of settlement within the fort, including platforms for roundhouses.

Hod Hill is the second in a series of Iron Age earthworks, starting from Hambledon Hill, and including Hod Hill, Spetisbury Rings, Buzbury Rings, Badbury Rings and Dudsbury Camp. The Iron Age port at Hengistbury Head forms a final Iron Age monument in this small chain of sites.

Although it is traditionally thought that the hill was captured in AD 43 by the Roman Second Legion (Augusta), led by Vespasian, who by then had already captured Maiden Castle and other hill forts to the south, this interpretation now seems unlikely. It is clear that the hillfort had long been abandoned by the time the Roman army arrived in Dorset, the many iron ballista bolts which have been found across the hill, clustered in the so-called "Chieftain's hut" area (two hut circles, one of which had an enclosure around it) are now more likely viewed as having been fired from the later Roman fort during target practice.

The Romans built a camp (200 m^{2} (2,200 sq ft)) in the north-west corner of the original fort, possibly occupied by a mixed force of legionaries and auxiliaries. The fort was used as a base for about 5 or 6 years, but passed out of use by about AD 50, when troops were withdrawn, after a fire, for the campaigns against Caractacus in Wales, and the remaining men were moved to a new fort further west at Waddon Hill.

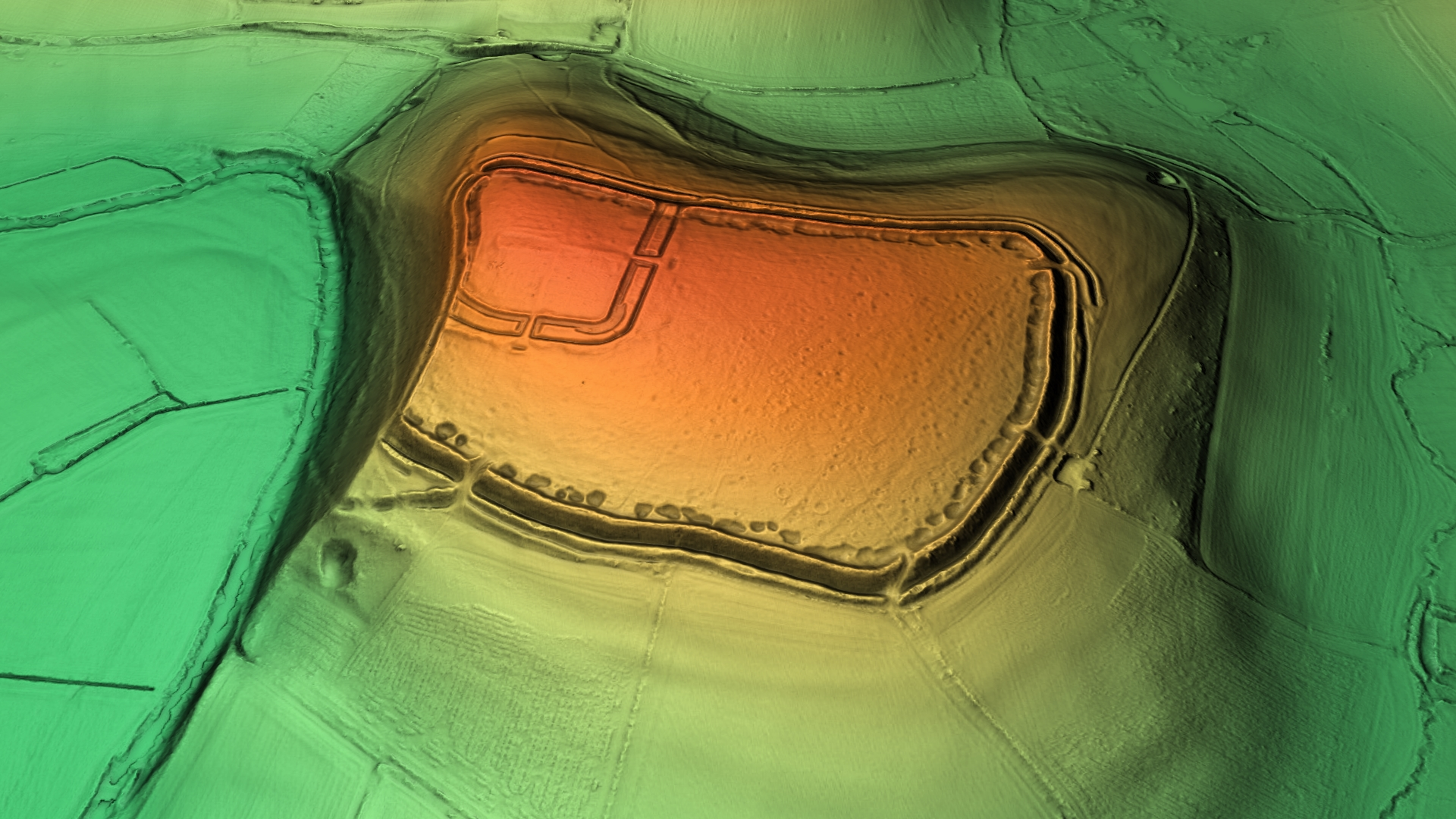
3D view of the digital terrain model, with the Roman fort at top left

The site was excavated in the 1950s by Sir Ian Richmond and his final report was published in 1969. Today the hill is an important calcareous grassland habitat, home to spectacular wild flowers and butterflies. The hillfort is a Scheduled Monument which is in the care of the National Trust with public access. The site was on the Heritage at Risk Register but was removed in 2022 as a result of the Hillforts and Habitats Project.

== Sources ==
- Castles from the air, Roly Smith (2000), in The Guardian.
- The Making Of The Dorset Landscape, Christopher Taylor, Hodder & Stoughton (London 1970).
- Dorset and the Second Legion, Norman Field (1992), ISBN 1-871164-11-7.
- Miles, David (1978). An introduction to archaeology (1st ed.). Great Britain: Ward Lock. ISBN 0-7063-5725-6. Contains a hand-drawn, plan-view illustration of the site on page 67.
