= Spetisbury =

Village and civil parish in Dorset, England

Coordinates: 50.8212°N 2.1259°W

- Village
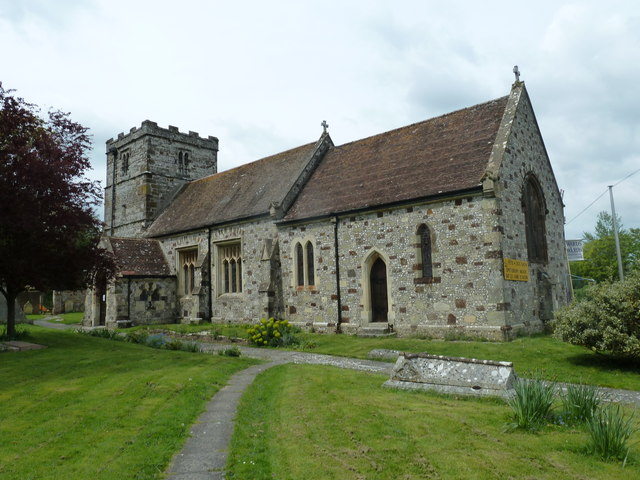
- Church of St John the Baptist

- Location within Dorset
- Population: 590
- OS grid reference: ST911026
- Unitary authority: Dorset
- Ceremonial county: Dorset
- Region: South West
- Country: England
- Sovereign state: United Kingdom
- Post town: Blandford Forum
- Postcode district: DT11
- Dialling code: 01258
- Police: Dorset
- Fire: Dorset and Wiltshire
- Ambulance: South Western
- UK Parliament: North Dorset

Spetisbury (/ˈspɛtsbəri/) is a village and civil parish in north Dorset, England, situated on the River Stour and the A350, four miles (six kilometres) southeast of Blandford Forum.

According to the Domesday Book of 1086, the village had 30 households. According to the 2011 census the parish had 224 households and a population of 555. According to the 2021 census, the parish had 250 households and a population of 590.

Spetisbury is a linear settlement, adjacent to the A350 road, which was included in Dorset County Council's response to the Major Roads Network (MRN) consultation, leading to some anticipation of a bypass of Spetisbury and neighbouring Charlton Marshall. A large solar farm was commissioned near Spetisbury in 2023 to provide energy for the City of London Corporation.

Spetisbury is twinned with Le Vast, a village in the Manche department of Normandy, France. The Manche department is itself is twinned with Dorset.

== Etymology ==
Spetisbury takes its name from the Old English words speoht (woodpecker) and byrig (a fort). Woodpeckers are commonly found in the village, and there is an Iron Age fort.

== Buildings and history ==
=== Spetisbury Rings ===
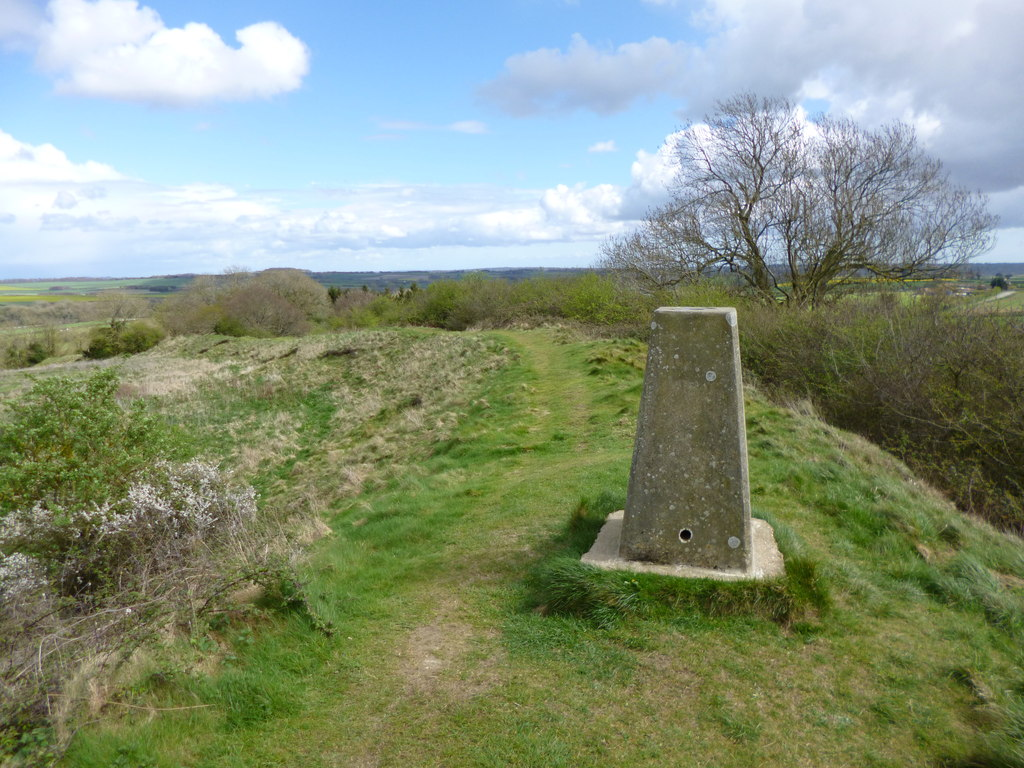
Spetisbury Rings

Spetisbury is home to the Iron Age fortifications known as Spetisbury Rings (previously known as Crawford Castle). Spetisbury Rings is the third in a series of Iron Age earthworks, after Hambledon Hill and Hod Hill, before Buzbury Rings, Badbury Rings, Dudsbury Camp and the port at Hengistbury Head. In the 1850s, during the construction of the Somerset and Dorset Joint Railway, two mass graves were found that contained over 80 skeletons. At least two of these had been killed violently. Alongside skeletons, a large number of items, including seaxes and spearheads, were discovered. The hillfort is a scheduled monument.

=== St John the Baptist ===
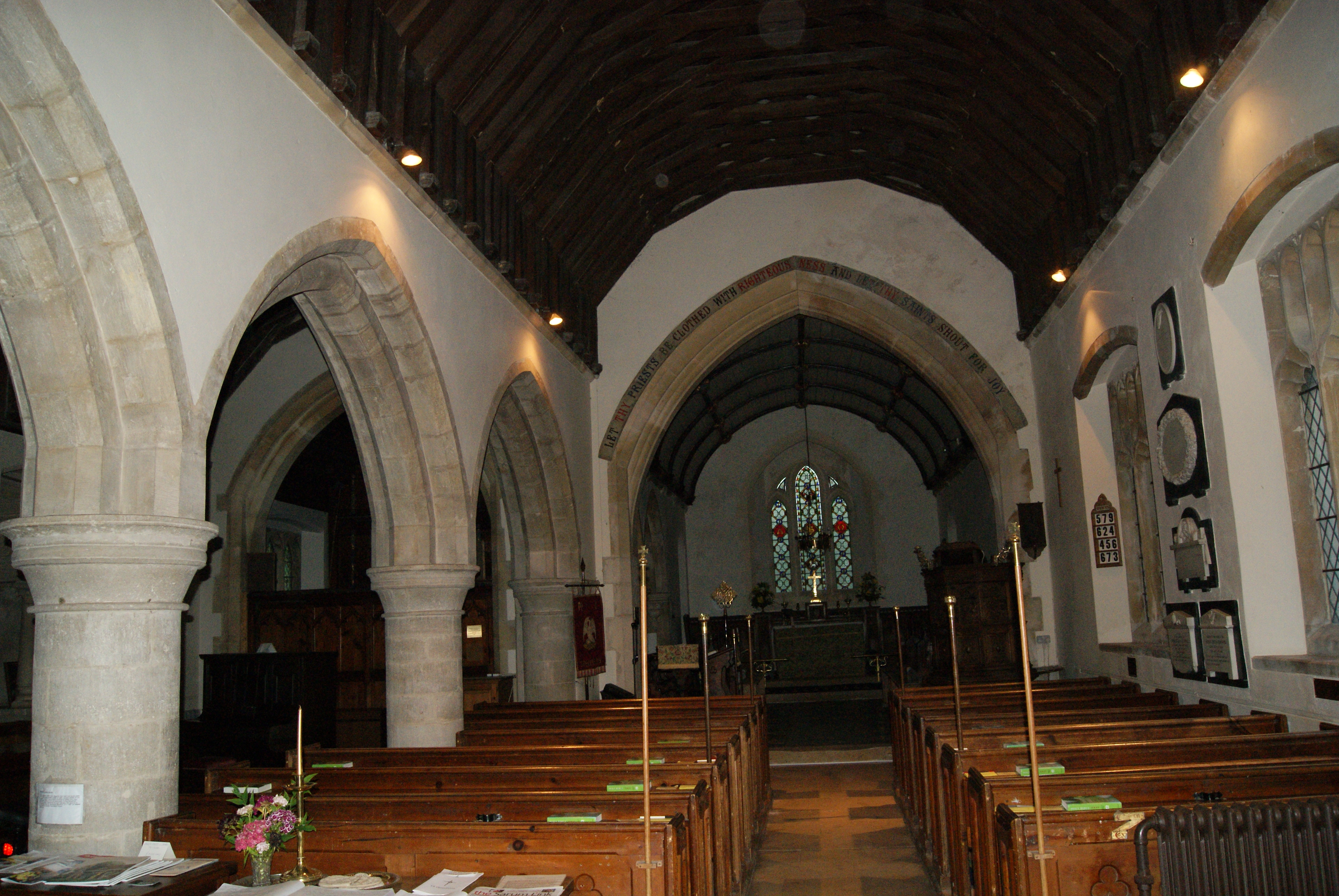
Inside St John the Baptist Church

The parish church of St John the Baptist lies on the west side of the A350. The north arcade dates from the late 12th or early 13th century and the tower (with a ring of six heavy bells) from the late 15th or early 16th century. Most of the church was built in 1858, before Thomas Henry Wyatt restored the building in 1895. The church was built with a mixture of building stones, chiefly knapped flint. The early-17th-century pulpit has ornate panelled sides, including cherub heads. The font was made of Purbeck marble, and is likely the same age as the tower. In the north wall, there is an early 17th-century monument to John Bowyer, who died in 1599. In the churchyard, close to the porch, is the three-sided pyramid gravestone of Thomas Rackett, rector of the village and Charlton Marshall for 60 years. The church is a Grade I listed building and the Rackett monument and octagonal memorial to the fallen of WWI and WWII are both Grade II listed.

=== Crawford Bridge ===
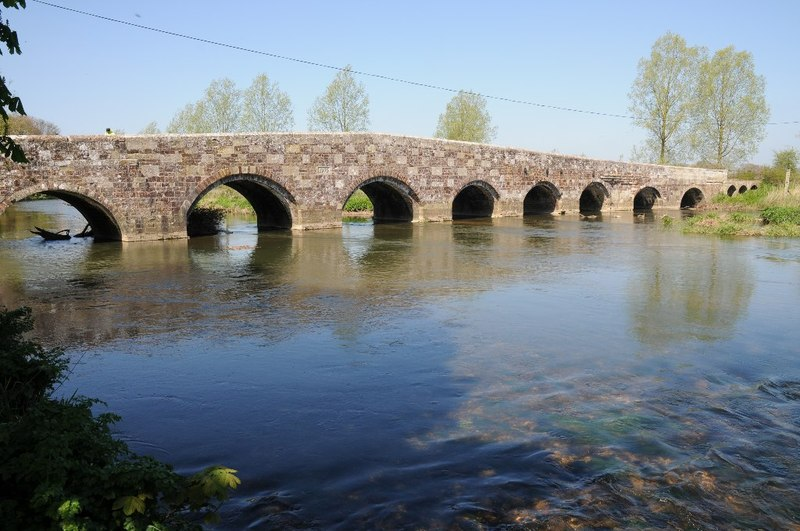
Crawford Bridge crossing the River Stour

The B3075 crosses the River Stour at Crawford Bridge. The bridge was built in the medieval period and widened in 1819. It has nine semicircular arches and is a Grade I listed building.

=== St Monica's Priory ===
In 1800, an 18th-century country house in the village was acquired by some Augustinian nuns (of the Congregation of Windesheim). The priory was then occupied by various religious groups including Brigittines (Syon nuns), Canons Regular of the Lateran and Ursulines. Although most of the original building was destroyed, some still remains and forms part of the village hall. There had previously been a house of Benedictine monks in the village.

=== Spetisbury Station ===
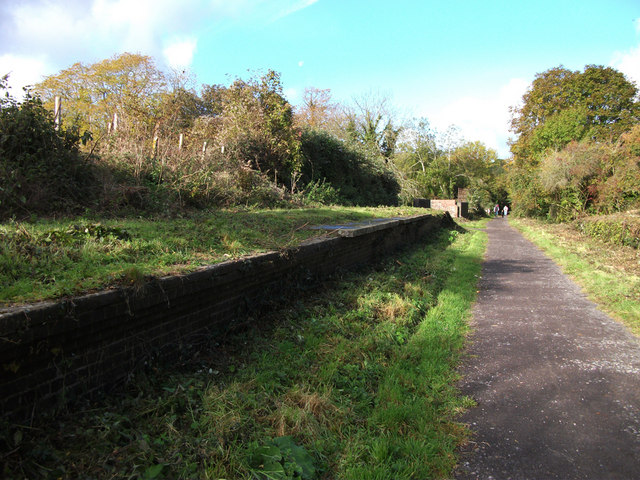
Spetisbury Station, before restoration

The village has a disused railway station on the former Somerset and Dorset Joint Railway. The station opened in 1860, but was one of four stations on the Dorset section of the line closed as an economy measure in 1956 before the whole railway closed for passengers in 1966 as part of the Beeching Axe. The route is now a footpath.

=== Spetisbury School ===
Dr Charles Sloper, rector of the parish, bequeathed £500 in his will to found a school in Spetisbury. Sloper also funded the construction of the village's rectory. Sloper's bequest complemented money given by John Hall to buy bibles. In 1733, a Christian school was founded in the village. This was before the introduction of compulsory state education. In 1862, it moved to its current building, next to the parish church. It is now called Spetisbury CofE Primary School, formerly Spetisbury (Hall and Sloper) School. During the Second World War, the school building was used as a radar base by the Royal Air Force.

=== The Woodpecker ===
There have been at least five pubs in the village, but all are now closed. The last was called "The Woodpecker", before it ceased trading in early 2019.
