= Badbury Rings =

Iron Age hill fort in east Dorset, England

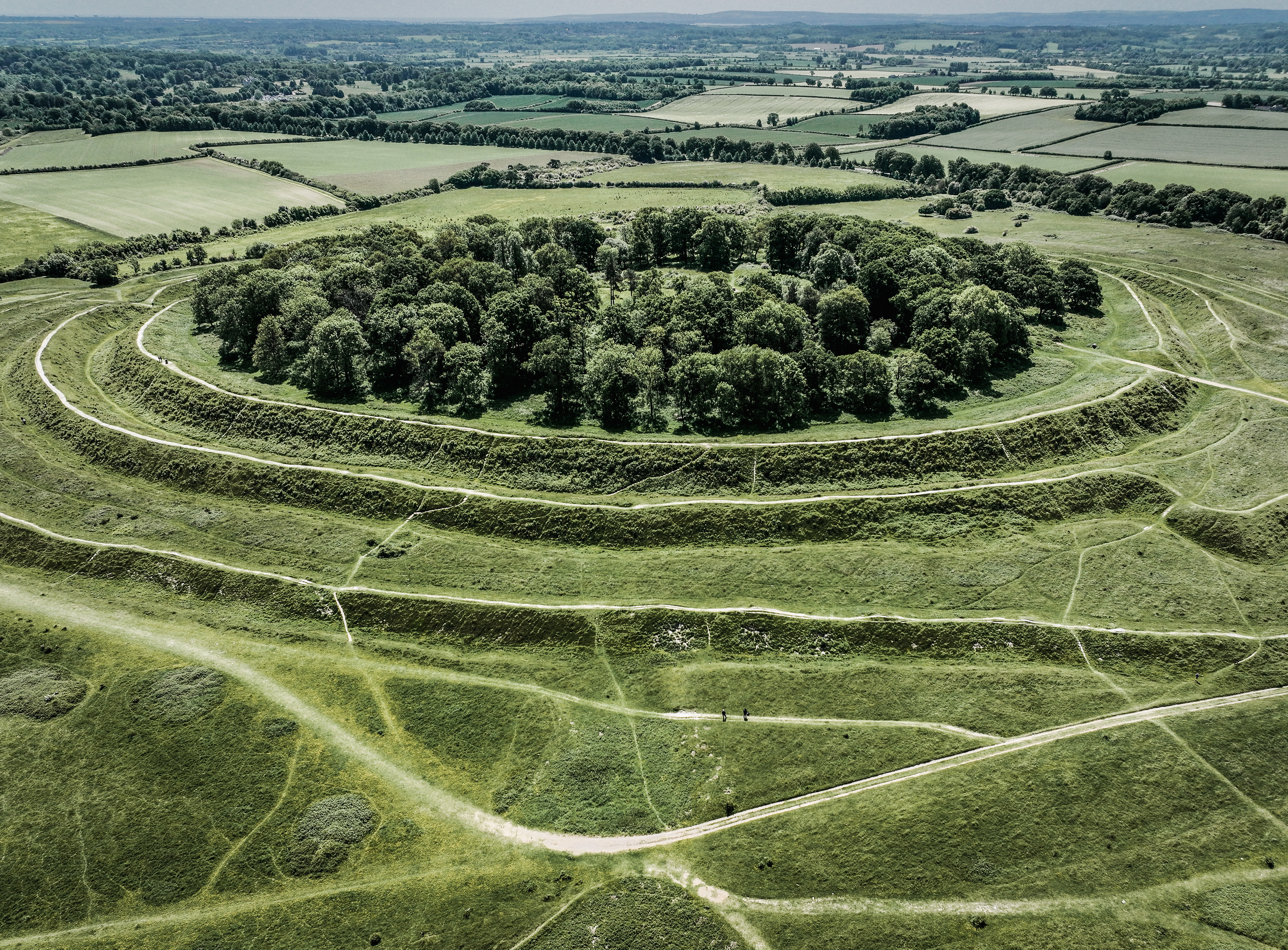
- Badbury Rings from the north

- Location within Dorset
- 50.8263°N 2.0515°W
- Type: Hillfort
- Periods: Iron Age
- Location: Shapwick, Dorset grid reference ST964030

Site notes
- Owner: National Trust
- Public access: Yes

Badbury Rings is an Iron Age hill fort and Scheduled Monument in east Dorset, England. It was in the territory of the Durotriges. In the Roman era a temple was located immediately west of the fort, and there was a Romano-British town known as Vindocladia a short distance to the south-west.

== Iron Age ==
Badbury Rings sits 327 feet (100 m) above sea level. There are two main phases of construction; the first covered 7.3 hectares (18 acres) and was defended by multiple ditches, while the second was more than twice the size, covering 16.6 ha (41 acres) and defended by a single ditch and rampart. Bronze Age round barrows in the vicinity demonstrate an earlier use of the area.

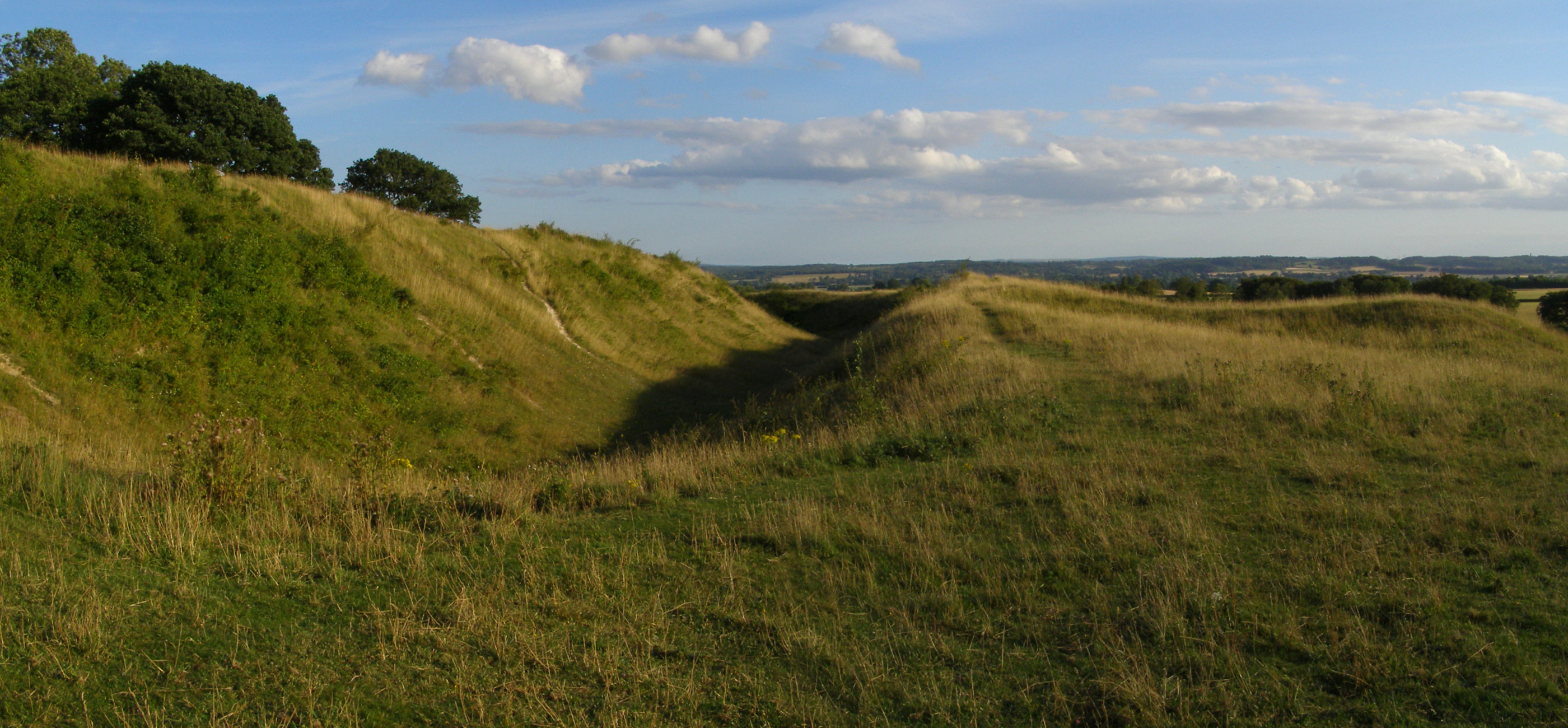
The ditches and ramparts at the entrance of Badbury Rings

Until 1983 Badbury Rings was privately owned as part of the Kingston Lacy estate, and the owners discouraged investigation of the site. The site now belongs to the National Trust. A survey of the hillfort by the RCHME was begun in 1993. The summit area was cleared of undergrowth by the National Trust in 1997 and the conifer plantation was thinned out. This allowed the RCHME to complete the survey in 1998, which recorded 28 potential hut sites within the ramparts, although some depressions are probably caused by uprooted trees. The first excavations, led by Martin Papworth, took place in 2004, when three evaluation trenches were dug. Almost all of the pottery found was dated to the Late Iron Age. The current evidence does not suggest that the hillfort was a principal settlement in the Early Iron Age. It seems likely that the hillfort became depopulated towards the end of the Late Iron Age, perhaps as the Vindocladia settlement near Shapwick developed.

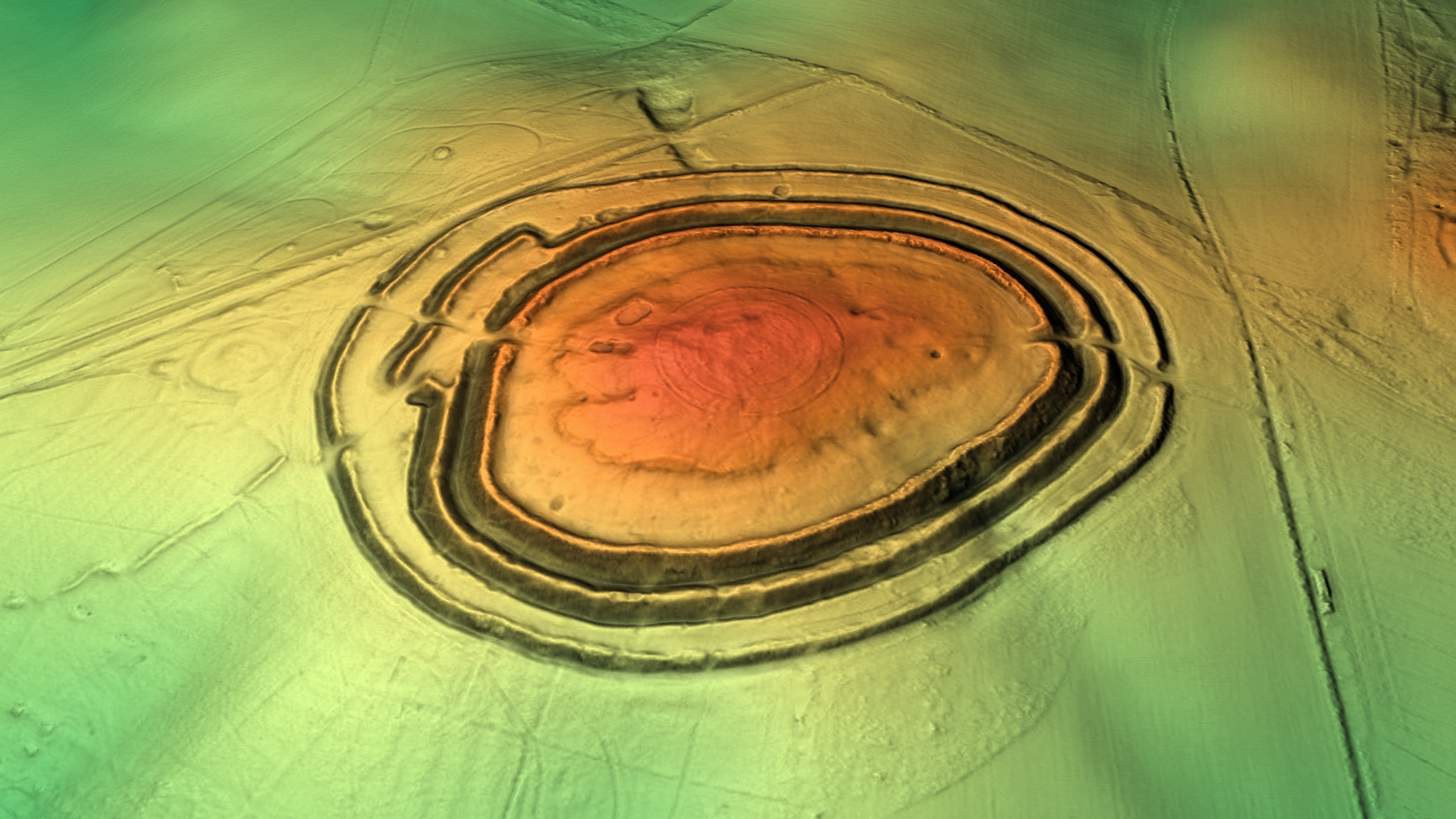
3D view of the digital terrain model

Badbury Rings is the fifth in a series of Iron Age earthworks, starting from Hambledon Hill, and also including Hod Hill, Spetisbury Rings, Buzbury Rings, Badbury Rings and Dudsbury Camp. The Iron Age port at Hengistbury Head forms a final Iron Age monument in this small chain of sites.

== Roman roads ==
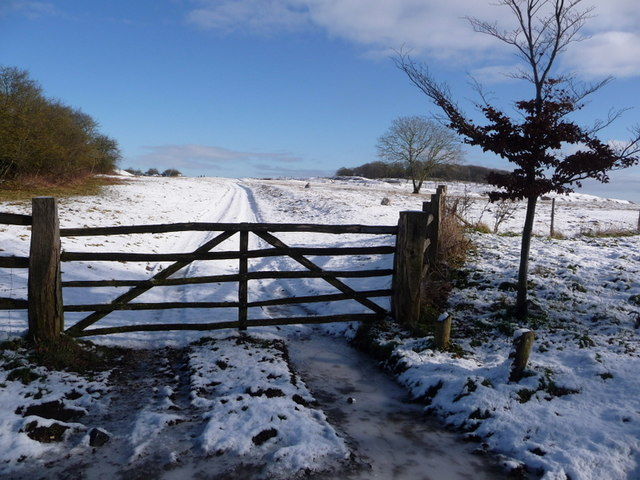
Roman road, now a bridle path. Badbury Rings is on the right.

During the Roman era, five Roman roads formed a complex junction on the north side of Badbury Rings.

The Roman Conquest of Britain began in AD 43. It is likely that the Legio II Augusta campaigned in Dorset under the command of the future emperor Vespasian. About 4 km (2 1/2 mi) southeast of Badbury Rings, at Lake Farm, Ashington, near Wimborne, a fort was established. A military road from the Lake Farm fort was created which passed by the northeast side of Badbury Rings. Beyond Badbury Rings the road headed in a northwest direction (visible today as a thin strip of woodland) heading for the Roman fort at Hod Hill. At an early stage, this road formed a junction with Ackling Dyke, a Roman road which headed northeast to Old Sarum (Sorviodunum). Another road ran across country in a north by northwest direction towards Bath (Aquae Sulis), and another ran south to a small port in Poole Harbour (Moriconium, modern Hamworthy). The final road (still used as a modern trackway on the west side of Badbury Rings) ran in a southwest direction through the settlement of Vindocladia heading towards Dorchester (Durnovaria). This final road was not built until the later Roman period.

== Romano-Celtic temple ==
Immediately west of Badbury Rings is the site of a Romano-Celtic temple. It is located within a polygonal boundary bank visible on aerial photographs. It was excavated as early as 1900, and again in 1952. These excavations revealed stone roofing slabs, painted wall-plaster, and over 185 Roman coins, as well as 21 Durotrigian silver and bronze coins. Pottery, glass beads, bronze pins, a bracelet and a brooch were also recovered. Further excavations were conducted in 2000 which showed that the temple was in use from the 1st to 5th centuries.

== Vindocladia ==
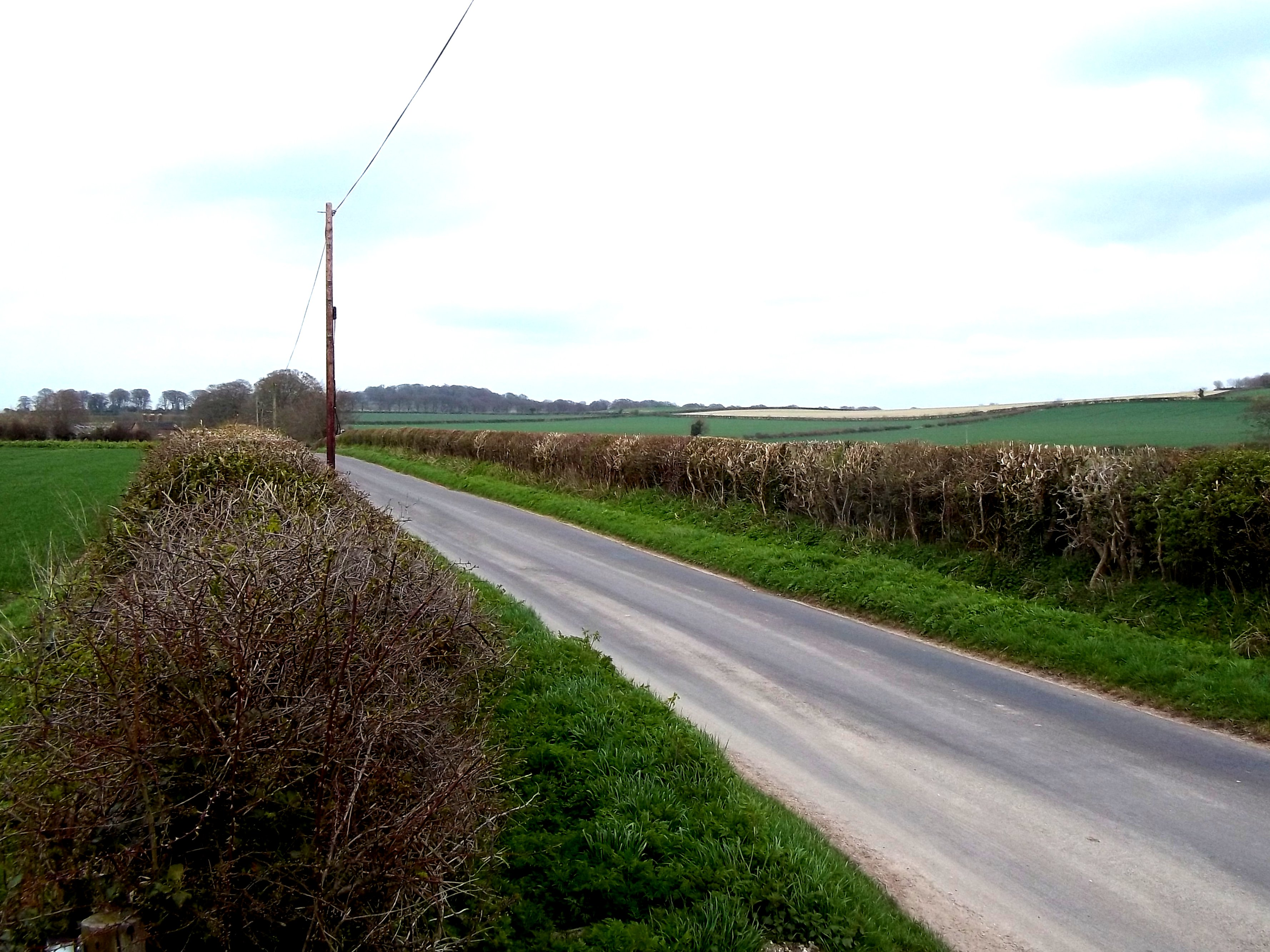
Approximate site of Vindocladia, looking northeast towards Badbury Rings

A short distance (1.5 km, 1 mi) to the southwest of Badbury Rings, between the hillfort and the modern village of Shapwick, lay a small Romano-British town (ST946022), believed to be that listed in the Antonine Itinerary as Vindocladia (from Brittonic *windos "white" + *klādiyos "ditch, earthwork"). In the later Roman period, a small fort was also established on the east side of the town. The fort was only discovered in 1975, and the existence of the town only came to light in the 1990s.

It has long been known that there was Roman activity in the area. A Roman pit and occupation debris were discovered in 1954 in the village of Shapwick, which included Samian ware pottery, a bronze coin of Claudius, and a rim fragment of a mortarium. In 1990 an archaeological field survey revealed three areas of building debris including roof and flue tiles, tesserae, and 2nd–4th century pottery. Excavations, led by Martin Papworth, took place in 1991, 1995, and 2004. The 1991 excavations uncovered robber trenches, tesserae, pottery, painted wall plaster and evidence for ironworking. The 1995 excavations demonstrated that the Roman occupation overlay numerous pits and ditches dating from the middle to late Iron Age, and uncovered smithing hearths dating from the second century. They further demonstrated that the Roman road through the settlement and the associated fort were not built until the later Roman period. Excavation of the settlement's boundary ditch in 2004 uncovered early first-century pottery, including a Samian-ware platter, as well as a first-century brooch.

The evidence suggests that the settlement began as a pre-Roman village or town of the late Iron-Age which continued in use in the Roman period. Coins and pottery recovered from the site show that it was occupied until at least the 5th century. A geophysical survey of the entire settlement has shown that the site covers 25 hectares. It appears to have been one of the biggest Roman towns in Dorset, second only to Dorchester (Durnovaria). It is likely that the town was the Vindocladia listed in the Antonine Itinerary as the only named place between Old Sarum (Sorviodunum) and Dorchester.

The Roman fort is a rectangular enclosure with straight sides and rounded corners, surrounded by triple ditches. It measures around 200 m × 160 m (220 yd × 170 yd) and encloses about 2.5 ha (6 acres). It is located on the east side of the town. Pottery picked up on the ground in 1975 suggested a mid 1st-century date for the fort. However, the subsequent excavations have revealed that the fort was not built until the later Roman period, and that the fort went out of use at the end of the Roman era. The fort contained a large building complex, and may have been the site of an imperial inn, or mansio.

== Post roman times ==
Martin Papworth's finds within the hillfort indicate that Badbury Rings was reoccupied c. 480 and 520 AD, perhaps as security declined

The ancient frontier of Bokerley Dyke to the northeast was revived and may have played a role in keeping the invading Saxons out of Dorset during the 5th and 6th centuries.

The identification of Badbury Rings with Battle of Mount Badon (first mentioned by Gildas) was reported in the 19th century by John Hutchins as originating with a supposition by the 'eminent Dr Edwin Guest' in the Salisbury Volume of the Archaeological Institute. Local historian Roy Carr has suggested that the Saxons were held off from crossing Bokerley Dyke, by the threat of an army in the west, perhaps stationed at Badbury Rings. Badbury Rings is one of three sites regularly advanced as the location of this battle. The surroundings of the city of Bath is a contender only based on the legendary text of Geoffrey of Mountmouth, who identifies it as the site of the battle, though the historical evidences suggest otherwise.

== Saxon era ==
According to the Anglo Saxon Chronicle, Edward the Elder brought an army to Badbury Rings, soon after his succession to the throne in 899, to face down a challenge to his claim for the crown by his cousin Æthelwold, based at nearby Wimborne Minster.

== Antiquarian accounts ==
The Tudor antiquarian John Leland visited Badbury Rings during his Itinerary of England conducted between 1538 and 1543. After speaking about the nearby town of Wimborne Minster he wrote:

The Saxon Kinges had hard by the Toune a Castelle now caullid Badbyri, but clerely down. The Diches, Hilles, and Site ther of be yet evidently seene. now Conyes borough in it.

== The site today ==
The site, on the dip slope of Cranborne Chase, is now part of the Kingston Lacy estate owned by the National Trust since 1982, with free access. The hillfort has been a scheduled ancient monument since 1924. On a clear day, the Isle of Wight is visible from the top.
