= Buzbury Rings =

Iron Age hillfort in Dorset, England

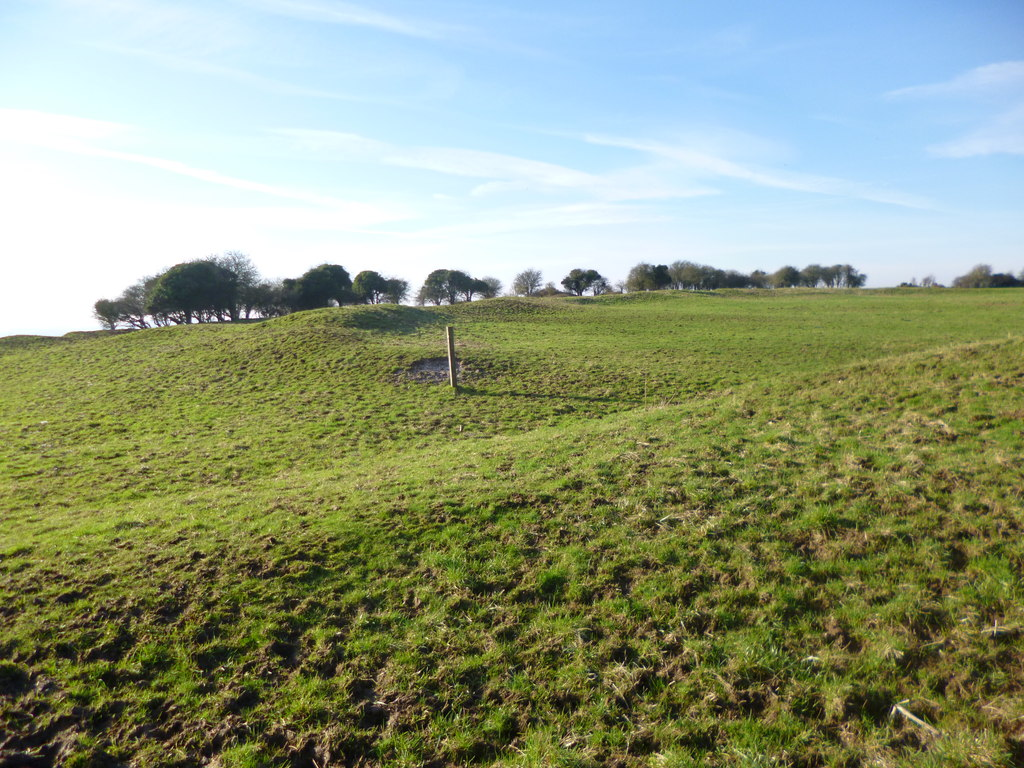

- Location within Dorset
- 50°51′10″N 2°7′2″W
- Type: Hillfort
- Periods: Iron Age; Roman
- Location: Near Blandford Forum, Dorset
- OS grid reference: ST 919 059

Site notes
- Area: 10 acres (4.0 ha)

Scheduled monument
- Designated: 26 March 1934
- Reference no.: 1002718

Buzbury Rings is an Iron Age hillfort about 2 miles (3.2 km) east of Blandford Forum and 1 mile (1.6 km) northwest of the village of Tarrant Keyneston, in Dorset, England.

It is a scheduled monument.

== Description ==
The site is on a hill on Keynston Down.

There is an inner enclosure, area about 3 acres (1.2 ha), bounded by a single bank of width 30 feet (9.1 m) and height 4 feet (1.2 m). Surrounding this is an outer enclosure, not concentric with the inner enclosure, of area about 10 acres (4.0 ha). It is bounded in the north and west by a single bank, width 20 feet (6.1 m) and height 3 feet (0.91 m); an outer ditch, now buried, has been revealed by partial excavation. In the south there is a double bank; the banks are up to 24 feet (7.3 m) wide, and the ditch between is about 10 feet (3.0 m) wide. There are traces of additional earthworks to the south.

The B3082 road runs north-west to south-east through the site; the north-east part of the inner bank has been erased by the road, and near the road there are other breaks in the inner bank caused by later tracks. The north-east part of the outer enclosure, opposite the road from the rest of the site, is within Ashley Wood golf course.

In the inner enclosure are roughly circular depressions of diameter 20–30 feet (6.1–9.1 m), probably the sites of buildings. Objects and occupation debris, from the Iron Age to the late Roman period, have been found over time, mostly in the inner enclosure.

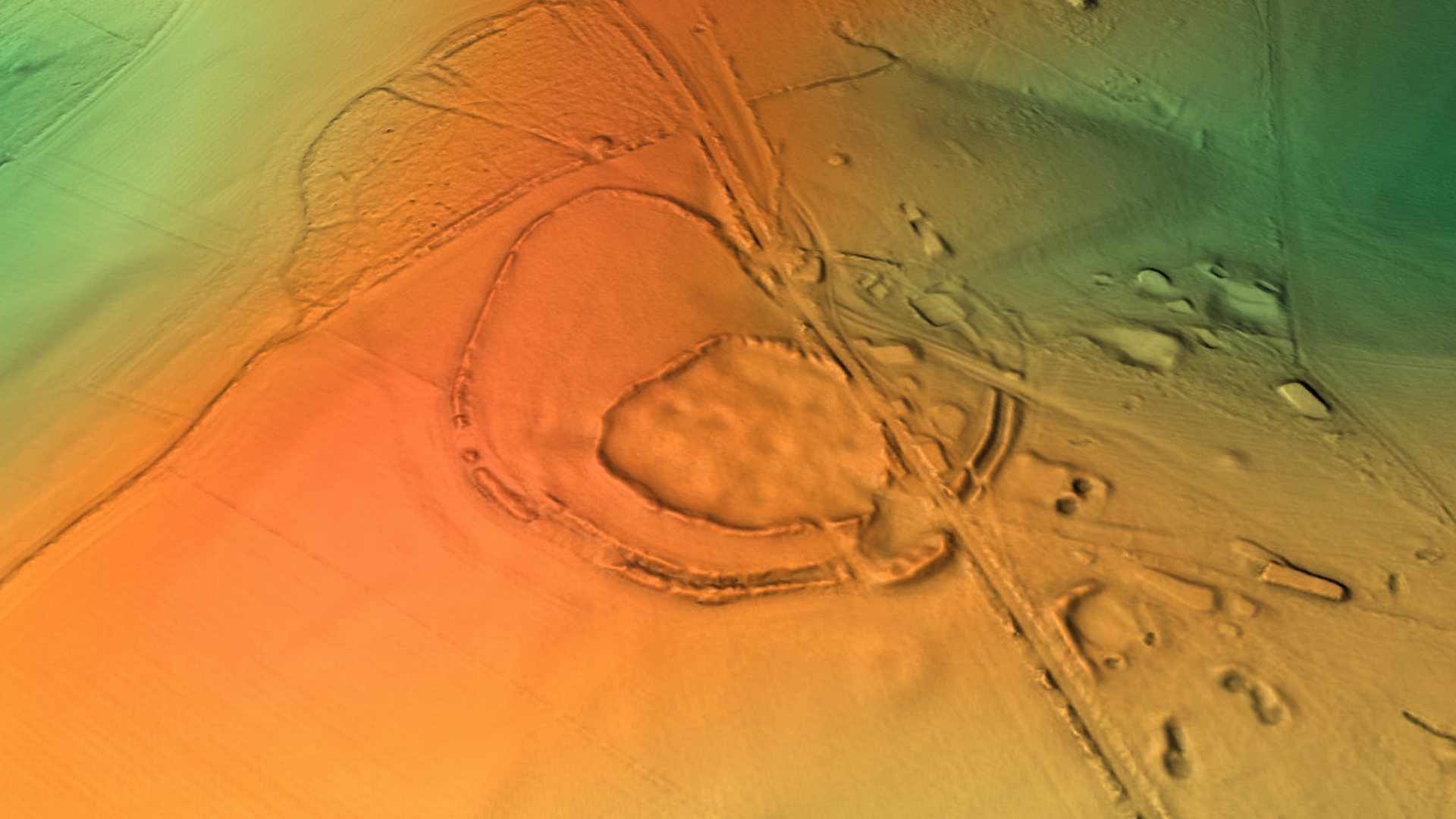
3D view of the digital terrain model

As a result of geophysical and lidar surveys of 2006, it is thought that the site's earliest remains are of a Neolithic causewayed enclosure, and that the site continued in use from that time into the later periods.

== See also ==
- Hillforts in Britain
