= List of city and town halls in England =

This is a list of city and town halls in England. The list is sortable by building age and height, and provides a link to the listing description where relevant. Where the architect is not from the locality of the town hall, their hometown is included. The list, which was compiled using the list of 1,000 Largest Cities and Towns in the UK by Population, published by The Geographist, to ensure completeness, includes over 800 surviving buildings. Notable examples of buildings which have not survived include the town halls of Kensington, Newcastle, Paddington and Sunderland. The oldest town hall, which was built as a chapel for pilgrims, is Dover Town Hall, thought to have been completed in around 1203, while the oldest purpose-built town hall is Bury St Edmunds Guildhall, which dates back to around 1220. The tallest town hall is Manchester Town Hall with a clock tower which rises to 280 feet (85 m).

Town or city	Building	Image	County	Built	Height	Notes
Abram	Abram Council Offices	More images	Greater Manchester	1903		Architects: Heaton, Ralph and Heaton.
Accrington	Accrington Town Hall	More images	Lancashire	1858		Grade II* listed (1362011). Architects: James F. Green and T. Birtwhistle.
Acton	Acton Town Hall	More images	Greater London	1910		Grade II listed (1390770). Architects: Raffles and Gridley.
Addlestone	Runnymede Civic Centre	More images	Surrey	2008		Architects: Feilden Clegg Bradley Studios.
Adwick le Street	Adwick Town Hall	More images	South Yorkshire	1682		
Alcester	Alcester Town Hall	More images	Warwickshire	1641		Grade I listed (1024606). Architect: Simon White.
Aldeburgh	The Moot Hall	More images	Suffolk	1520		Grade I listed (1269716).
Aldershot	Aldershot Town Hall	More images	Hampshire	1904		Grade II listed (1092638). Architect: Charles E. Hutchinson.
Alnwick	Alnwick Town Hall	More images	Northumberland	1731		Grade I listed (1157140).
Alresford	Alresford Town Hall	More images	Hampshire	1866		Grade II listed (1095198). Architect: William Hunt.
Alston	Alston Town Hall	More images	Cumbria	1858		Grade II listed (1106388). Architect: Alfred Burdakin Higham
Alton	Alton Town Hall	More images	Hampshire	1813		Grade II listed (1094175).
Altrincham	Altrincham Town Hall	More images	Greater Manchester	1901		Architect: Charles Albert Hindle.
Altrincham	Old Town Hall, Altrincham	More images	Greater Manchester	1849		Grade II listed (1067960).
Amersham	Amersham Town Hall	More images	Buckinghamshire	1682		Grade II* listed (1221420).
Andover	Andover Guildhall	More images	Hampshire	1825		Grade II* listed (1236337).
Anerley	Anerley Town Hall	More images	Greater London	1879		Architect: George Elkington.
Appleby-in-Westmorland	The Moot Hall	More images	Cumbria	1596		Grade II* listed (1145607).
Arundel	Arundel Town Hall	More images	West Sussex	1838		Grade II listed (1027921). Architect: Robert Abraham of London.
Ashbourne	Ashbourne Town Hall	More images	Derbyshire	1861		Grade II listed (1109530). Architect: Benjamin Wilson.
Ashburton	Ashburton Town Hall	More images	Devon	1850		Grade II listed (1201012). Architect: Alfred Norman.
Ashby-de-la-Zouch	Ashby-de-la-Zouch Town Hall	More images	Leicestershire	1857		Grade II listed (1073608). Architect: Henry Isaac Stevens of Derby.
Ashington	Ashington Town Hall	More images	Northumberland	1913		
Ashton-under-Lyne, Tameside	Ashton Town Hall	More images	Greater Manchester	1840		Grade II listed (1067995). Architects: William Young of Glasgow and Charles Lee of London.
Atherton	Atherton Town Hall	More images	Greater Manchester	1900		Architect: James Caldwell Prestwich.
Axbridge	Axbridge Town Hall	More images	Somerset	1830		Grade II listed (1344886).
Axminster	Axminster Guildhall	More images	Devon	1931		
Aylesbury	Aylesbury Town Hall	More images	Buckinghamshire	1865		Grade II* listed (1117935). Architect: David Brandon.
Aylsham	Aylsham Town Hall	More images	Norfolk	1857		Grade II listed (1306405).
Bacup	Bacup Town Hall	More images	Lancashire	1808		Grade II listed (1163375).
Bakewell	Bakewell Town Hall	More images	Derbyshire	1890		Architect: George E. Statham.
Bakewell	Old Town Hall, Bakewell	More images	Derbyshire	1602		Grade II listed (1246178).
Baldock	Baldock Town Hall	More images	Hertfordshire	1897		Locally listed.
Bampton	Bampton Town Hall	More images	Oxfordshire	1838		Grade II listed (1198742). Architect: George Wilkinson.
Banbury	Banbury Town Hall	More images	Oxfordshire	1854		Grade II listed (1369525). Architect: Edward George Bruton.
Barking	Barking Town Hall	More images	Greater London	1958		Architect: Herbert Jackson and Reginald Edmonds.
Barking	Old Town Hall, Barking	More images	Greater London	1893		Grade II listed (1359304). Architect: Charles James Dawson.
Barnsley	Barnsley Town Hall	More images	South Yorkshire	1933	44 metres (144 ft)	Grade II listed (1067995). Architects: Briggs and Thornely of Liverpool.
Barnstaple	Barnstaple Guildhall	More images	Devon	1828		Grade II* listed (1385188). Architect: Thomas Lee.
Barrow-in-Furness	Barrow-in-Furness Town Hall	More images	Cumbria	1887	50 metres (164 ft)	Grade II* listed (1197859). Architect: William Henry Lynn of Belfast.
Basingstoke	Basingstoke Town Hall	More images	Hampshire	1835		Grade II listed (1230876). Architect: Lewis Wyatt.
Bath	The Guildhall	More images	Somerset	1778		Grade I listed (1396021). Architect: Thomas Baldwin.
Batley	Batley Town Hall	More images	West Yorkshire	1854		Grade II listed (1300324).
Battersea	Battersea Town Hall	More images	Greater London	1893		Grade II* listed (1184293). Now used for Battersea Arts Centre. Architect: Edward William Mountford.
Bawtry	Old Town Hall, Bawtry	More images	South Yorkshire	1890		
Beaconsfield	Beaconsfield Town Hall	More images	Buckinghamshire	1936		Architects: Burgess, Holden & Watson together with John Crosby.
Beccles	Beccles Town Hall	More images	Suffolk	1726		Grade II listed (1205749).
Bedford	Old Town Hall, Bedford	More images	Bedfordshire	1550		Grade II listed (1114520). Architect: Isaac Clayson.
Bedminster	Bedminster Town Hall	More images	Bristol	1891		
Beeston	Beeston Town Hall	More images	Nottinghamshire	1938		Architects: Evans, Clark and Woollatt.
Bellingham	Bellingham Town Hall	More images	Northumberland	1862		Grade II listed (1153580).
Bentham	Bentham Town Hall	More images	North Yorkshire	1877		
Berkeley	Berkeley Town Hall	More images	Gloucestershire	1824		Grade II listed (1222026).
Berkhamsted	Berkhamsted Civic Centre	More images	Hertfordshire	1938		Architect: John Hadfield.
Berkhamsted	Berkhamsted Town Hall	More images	Hertfordshire	1859		Grade II listed (1078138). Architect: Edward Buckton Lamb of London.
Bermondsey	Bermondsey Town Hall	More images	Greater London	1930		Grade II listed (1385930). Architect: Henry Tansley.
Berwick-upon-Tweed	Berwick Town Hall	More images	Northumberland	1760	46 metres (151 ft)	Grade I listed (1290051). Architect: Samuel and John Worrell.
Bethnal Green	Bethnal Green Town Hall	More images	Greater London	1910		Grade II listed (1065243). Architects: Percy Robinson and William Alban Jones.
Beverley	Beverley Guildhall	More images	East Riding of Yorkshire	1320		Grade I listed (1083960)
Bewdley	Bewdley Guildhall	More images	Worcestershire	1808		Grade II* listed (1100788). Architect: John Simpson of Shrewsbury.
Bexhill-on-Sea	Bexhill Town Hall	More images	East Sussex	1895		Grade II listed (1483735). Architect: Henry Ward.
Bexleyheath	Bexley Civic Offices	More images	Greater London	1989		Architect (for the conversion to Civic Offices): Bennetts Associates.
Biddulph	Biddulph Town Hall	More images	Staffordshire	1965		
Bideford	Bideford Town Hall	More images	Devon	1851		Grade II listed (1200934). Architects: Richard Davie Gould and Alfred Dunn.
Biggleswade	Old Town Hall, Biggleswade	More images	Bedfordshire	1844		Grade II listed (1321421). Architect: James Tacy Wing.
Billericay	Old Town Hall, Billericay	More images	Essex	1830		
Bilston	Bilston Town Hall	More images	West Midlands	1873		Grade II listed (1201834). Architect: Bidlake and Lovatt.
Bingley	Bingley Town Hall	More images	West Yorkshire	1770		Grade II listed (1314271).
Birkenhead, Wirral	Birkenhead Town Hall	More images	Merseyside	1887	61 metres (200 ft)	Grade II* listed (1201582). Architect: Christopher Ellison.
Birmingham	Council House	More images	West Midlands	1879	29 metres (95 ft)	Grade II* listed (1210333). Architect: Yeoville Thomason.
Birmingham	Birmingham Town Hall	More images	West Midlands	1834		Grade I listed (1343161). Used as a concert hall. Architects: Joseph Hansom & Edward Welch.
Bishop Auckland	Bishop Auckland Town Hall	More images	County Durham	1862		Grade II* listed (1297550). Now houses public library, theatre, art gallery, tourist information centre and café-bar. Architect: John Philpott Jones.
Bishop's Castle	Bishop's Castle Town Hall	More images	Shropshire	1750		Grade II* listed (1054552). Architect: William Baker.
Blackburn	Blackburn Town Hall	More images	Lancashire	1856	60 metres (197 ft) (annexe)	Grade II listed (1239734). Architect: James Patterson.
Blackpool	Blackpool Town Hall	More images	Lancashire	1900		Grade II listed (1205893). Architects: Potts, Son and Hennings of Oldham.
Blandford Forum	Blandford Forum Town Hall	More images	Dorset	1734		Grade I listed (1324806). Architects: John and William Bastard.
Bodmin	Bodmin Guildhall	More images	Cornwall	1536		Grade II listed (1206466).
Bognor Regis	Bognor Regis Town Hall	More images	West Sussex	1930		Grade II listed (1350337). Architects: Charles Cowles-Voysey.
Bolton	Bolton Town Hall	More images	Greater Manchester	1866–1873	61 metres (200 ft)	Grade II* listed (1388295). Architect: William Hill of Leeds. Extended in the 1930s to the designs of Bradshaw, Gass and Hope.
Bootle	Bootle Town Hall	More images	Merseyside	1882		Grade II listed (1075891). Architect: John Johnson of London.
Bosham	Old Town Hall, Bosham	More images	West Sussex	1694		Grade II listed (1229816).
Boston	Municipal Buildings	More images	Lincolnshire	1904		Architect: James Rowell.
Bourne	Bourne Town Hall	More images	Lincolnshire	1821		Grade II listed (1242224). Architect: Bryan Browning.
Bournemouth	Bournemouth Town Hall	More images	Dorset	1885		Grade II listed (1389612). Architect: Alfred Bedborough.
Bovey Tracey	Bovey Tracey Town Hall	More images	Devon	1866		Grade II listed (1165878).
Brackley	Brackley Town Hall	More images	Northamptonshire	1706		Grade II* listed (1190100).
Bradford	Bradford City Hall	More images	West Yorkshire	1873	67 metres (220 ft)	Grade I listed (1388295). Architects: Lockwood and Mawson.
Bradford-on-Avon	Bradford-on-Avon Town Hall	More images	Wiltshire	1854		Grade II listed (1364518). Architect: Thomas Fuller of Bath.
Brading	New Town Hall, Brading	More images	Isle of Wight	1903		Architect: James Newman.
Brading	Old Town Hall, Brading	More images	Isle of Wight	1730		Grade II listed (1219522).
Bradninch	Bradninch Guildhall	More images	Devon	1835		Grade II listed (1326117).
Braintree	Braintree Town Hall	More images	Essex	1928		Grade II* listed (1235026). Architect: E. Vincent Harris.
Brampton	The Moot Hall	More images	Cumbria	1817		Grade II* listed (1137330).
Brent	Brent Civic Centre	More images	Greater London	2013	46 metres (151 ft)	Architect: Hopkins.
Brent	Brent Town Hall	More images	Greater London	1940		Grade II listed (1262141). Now Lycée International de Londres Winston Churchill. Architect: Clifford Strange.
Brentwood	Brentwood Town Hall	More images	Essex	1957		Architects: John Brandon-Jones, Ashton & Broadbent.
Bridgnorth	Bridgnorth Town Hall	More images	Shropshire	1652		Grade II* listed (1053998).
Bridgwater	Bridgwater Town Hall	More images	Somerset	1823		Grade II* listed (1280140). Architects: Richard Carver and Charles Knowles.
Bridlington	Bridlington Town Hall	More images	East Riding of Yorkshire	1932		Grade II listed (1334329). Architect: Percy Maurice Newton.
Bridport	Bridport Town Hall	More images	Dorset	1786		Grade I listed (1227851). Architect: William Tyler RA of London.
Brierfield	Brierfield Town Hall	More images	Lancashire	1833		Grade II listed (1361692).
Brigg	Old Town Hall, Brigg	More images	Lincolnshire	1819		Grade II listed (1083130).
Brighouse	Brighouse Town Hall	More images	West Yorkshire	1887		Grade II listed (1133856). Architect: John Lord.
Brighton	Brighton Town Hall	More images	East Sussex	1832		Grade II listed (1379974). Architect: Thomas Cooper.
Bristol	Bristol City Hall	More images	Bristol	1952		Grade II* listed (1282341). Known as the Council House until 2012. Architect: Vincent Harris.
Bristol	Old Council House	More images	Bristol	1827		Grade II* listed (1207433). Architect: Sir Robert Smirke of London.
Brixham	Brixham Town Hall	More images	Devon	1886		Grade II listed (1298263). Architect: George Bridgman.
Bromley	Bromley Civic Centre	More images	Greater London	1988		
Bromley	Bromley Palace	More images	Greater London	1776		Grade II listed (1281268).
Bromley	Bromley Town Hall	More images	Greater London	1906		Grade II listed (1299012). Architect: R. Frank Atkinson.
Broughton-in-Furness	Old Town Hall, Broughton-in-Furness	More images	Cumbria	1766		Grade II listed.(1138235).
Brownhills	Council House, Brownhills	More images	West Midlands	1882		Locally listed. Architect: John Siddalls.
Buckfastleigh	Buckfastleigh Town Hall	More images	Devon	1887		Architect: James Hine of Hine & Odgers in Plymouth.
Buckingham	Buckingham Town Hall	More images	Buckinghamshire	1783		Grade II* listed (1282685).
Bulwell	Old Town Hall, Bulwell	More images	Nottinghamshire	1894		
Burford	The Tolsey	More images	Oxfordshire	1520		Grade II* listed (1224632).
Burnley	Burnley Town Hall	More images	Lancashire	1888	27 metres (89 ft)	Grade II listed (1244910). Architects: Henry Holtom and George Arthur Fox.
Burslem, Stoke-on-Trent	Old Town Hall, Burslem	More images	Staffordshire	1857		Grade II* listed (1195811). Architect: GT Robinson of Leamington.
Burton upon Trent	Burton upon Trent Town Hall	More images	Staffordshire	1878		Grade II listed (1038703). Architect: Reginald Churchill.
Bury	Bury Town Hall	More images	Greater Manchester	1954		Locally listed. Architect: Reginald Edmonds.
Bury St Edmunds	Bury St Edmunds Guildhall	More images	Suffolk	1220		Grade I listed (1363726). Used as event and exhibition space.
Bury St Edmunds	Bury St Edmunds Town Hall	More images	Suffolk	1780		Grade I listed (1076930). Architect: Robert Adam of London.
Buxton	Buxton Town Hall	More images	Derbyshire	1889		Grade II listed (1259171). Architect: William Pollard of Manchester.
Calne	Calne Town Hall	More images	Wiltshire	1886		Grade II listed (1270827). Architect: Bryan Oliver.
Camberwell	Camberwell Town Hall	More images	Greater London	1934		Architects: Culpin and Bowers.
Camborne	Camborne Council Offices	More images	Cornwall	1903		Grade II listed (1142644).
Camborne	Camborne Town Hall	More images	Cornwall	1867		Grade II listed (1311028).
Cambridge	Cambridge Guildhall	More images	Cambridgeshire	1939		Grade II listed (1268372). Architect: Charles Cowles-Voysey.
Camden	Camden Town Hall	More images	Greater London	1937		Grade II listed (1379162). Known as St Pancras Town Hall until 1965. Architect: Albert Thomas.
Camelford	Camelford Town Hall	More images	Cornwall	1806		Grade II listed (1138348).
Canterbury	Canterbury Guildhall	More images	Kent	1381		Grade II* listed (1241661).
Carlisle	Old Town Hall, Carlisle	More images	Cumbria	1669		Grade I listed (1218104).
Carlisle	Carlisle Civic Centre	More images	Cumbria	1964	44 metres (144 ft)	Architects: Charles B. Pearson and Partners.
Carshalton	Carshalton Council Offices	More images	Greater London	1908		Grade II listed (1300429). Architects: R. Frank Atkinson and W. Willis Gale.
Carterton	Carterton Town Hall	More images	Oxfordshire	1983		
Castle Cary	Castle Cary Town Hall	More images	Somerset	1855		Grade II* listed (1056254). Architect: Francis Penrose.
Castleford	Castleford Civic Centre	More images	West Yorkshire	1970		Architects: Griffiths Lewis Goad Partnership.
Chadderton	Chadderton Town Hall	More images	Greater Manchester	1913		Grade II listed (1404904). Architects: Taylor & Simister.
Chapel-en-le-Frith	Chapel-en-le-Frith Town Hall	More images	Derbyshire	1851		
Chard	Chard Guildhall	More images	Somerset	1835		Grade II* listed (1197456). Architect: Richard Carver.
Chatham	Chatham Town Hall	More images	Kent	1900		Grade II listed (1268228). Architect: George Edward Bond.
Cheetham	Cheetham Town Hall	More images	Greater Manchester	1855		Grade II listed (1208440). Architect: Thomas Bird.
Chelmsford	Chelmsford Civic Centre	More images	Essex	1935		Locally listed. Architects: Cordingley & McIntyre.
Chelsea	Chelsea Town Hall	More images	Greater London	1887		Part Grade II* listed (1294164), part Grade II listed (1224630). Architect: John McKean Brydon (older part) and Leonard Stokes (newer part).
Cheltenham	Cheltenham Town Hall	More images	Gloucestershire	1903		Grade II listed (1104376). Architect: Frederick William Waller.
Cheltenham	Cheltenham Municipal Offices	More images	Gloucestershire	1840		Grade II* listed (1387631). Architect: George Allen Underwood.
Chertsey	Old Town Hall, Chertsey	More images	Surrey	1851		Grade II listed (1295138). Architect: George Briand.
Chester	Chester Town Hall	More images	Cheshire	1869	49 metres (161 ft)	Grade II* listed (1376371). Architect: William Henry Lynn of Belfast.
Chesterfield	Chesterfield Town Hall	More images	Derbyshire	1938		Grade II listed (1113305). Architect: Bradshaw Gass & Hope of Bolton.
Chichester	The Council House	More images	West Sussex	1731		Grade II* listed (1354331). Architects: Roger Morris and James Wyatt.
Chingford	Chingford Town Hall	More images	Greater London	1929		Locally listed. Architects: Frank Nash and H.T. Bonner.
Chippenham	Yelde Hall	More images	Wiltshire	1450		Grade I listed (1267996).
Chippenham	Chippenham Town Hall	More images	Wiltshire	1834		Grade II listed (1268113). Architect: James Thomson.
Chipping Campden	Chipping Campden Town Hall	More images	Gloucestershire	1897		Grade II* listed (1078401).
Chipping Norton	Chipping Norton Town Hall	More images	Oxfordshire	1842		Grade II listed (1183188). Architect: George Stanley Repton.
Chipping Sodbury	Chipping Sodbury Town Hall	More images	Gloucestershire	1858		Grade II listed (1129244).
Chiswick	Chiswick Town Hall	More images	Greater London	1876		Grade II listed (1260615). Architect: W. J. Trehearne.
Chorley	Chorley Town Hall	More images	Lancashire	1879		Architects: John Ladds and William Henry Powell.
Chorlton-on-Medlock	Chorlton-on-Medlock Town Hall	More images	Greater Manchester	1831		Grade II listed (1283062). Architect: Richard Lane.
Christchurch	Christchurch Town Hall	More images	Dorset	1746		Grade II listed (1324677).
Chudleigh	Chudleigh Town Hall	More images	Devon	1865		Grade II listed (1334259).
City of London	The Guildhall	More images	Greater London	1440		Grade I listed (1064675).
Clacton-on-Sea	Clacton Town Hall	More images	Essex	1931		Grade II listed (1267903). Architect: Sir Alfred Brumwell Thomas of London.
Clare	Clare Town Hall	More images	Suffolk	1913		Architect: Percy Monroe Beaumont.
Cleckheaton	Cleckheaton Town Hall	More images	West Yorkshire	1892		Grade II listed (1313688). Architects: Mawson & Hudson.
Cleethorpes	Cleethorpes Town Hall	More images	Lincolnshire	1905		Grade II listed (1103474). Architect: Herbert Scaping.
Clevedon	Clevedon Town Hall	More images	Somerset	1860		Grade II listed (1113001).
Clitheroe	Old Town Hall, Clitheroe	More images	Lancashire	1820	19 metres (62 ft)	Grade II listed (1072374). Architect: Thomas Rickman.
Clun	Clun Town Hall	More images	Shropshire	1780		Grade II* listed (1054426).
Cockermouth	Cockermouth Town Hall	More images	Cumbria	1841		Grade II listed (1055821).
Colchester	Colchester Town Hall	More images	Essex	1902	59 metres (194 ft)	Grade II listed (1337736). Architect: John Belcher of London.
Colne	Colne Town Hall	More images	Lancashire	1894		Grade II listed (1073412). Architect: Alfred Waterhouse.
Colyton	Colyton Town Hall	More images	Devon	1927		Architect: J. Archibald Lucas.
Congleton	Congleton Town Hall	More images	Cheshire	1866	34 metres (112 ft)	Grade II* listed (1086996). Architect: Edward William Godwin of London.
Corbridge	Corbridge Town Hall	More images	Northumberland	1887		Grade II listed (1044757). Architect: Frank Emley.
Corby	Corby Cube	More images	Northamptonshire	2010		Architect: Hawkins\Brown
Corfe Castle	Corfe Castle Town Hall	More images	Dorset	1774		Grade II* listed (1121006).
Corsham	Corsham Town Hall	More images	Wiltshire	1882		Grade II listed (1284062). Architect: William Harris Bromley.
Cottingley	Cottingley Town Hall	More images	West Yorkshire	1865		Grade II listed (1314305). Architect: Samuel Jackson.
Coventry	Council House	More images	West Midlands	1917		Grade II listed (1342927). Architect: Edward Garret and H W Simister of Birmingham.
Crawley	Crawley Town Hall	More images	West Sussex	2022		Architects: Cartwright Pickard.
Crayford	Crayford Town Hall	More images	Greater London	1915		Locally listed.
Crediton	Old Town Hall, Crediton	More images	Devon	1852		Grade II listed (1208961). Architect: Richard Davie Gould of Barnstaple.
Crewe	Crewe Municipal Buildings	More images	Cheshire	1905		Grade II listed (1136190). Architect: Henry Hare of London.
Crewkerne	Crewkerne Town Hall	More images	Somerset	1742		Grade II listed (1281919).
Cricklade	Cricklade Town Hall	More images	Wiltshire	1933		Architect:Eric Cole
Cricklade	Old Town Hall, Cricklade	More images	Wiltshire	1861		Grade II listed (1023124). Architect: James Lansdown.
Cromer	Old Town Hall, Cromer	More images	Norfolk	1890		Grade II listed (1171785). Architect: George Skipper of Norwich.
Croydon	Croydon Town Hall	More images	Greater London	1896	49 metres (161 ft)	Grade II listed (1188798). Architect: Charles Henman.
Cullompton	Cullompton Town Hall	More images	Devon	1903		
Dagenham	Dagenham Civic Centre	More images	Greater London	1937		Grade II listed (1064422). Architect: Ernest Berry Webber.
Dalton-in-Furness	Dalton Town Hall	More images	Cumbria	1884		Grade II listed (1218867). Architect: John Young McIntosh.
Darlington	Darlington Town Hall	More images	County Durham	1970		Architect: Williamson, Faulkner Brown and Partners.
Darlington	Old Town Hall and Market Hall	More images	County Durham	1864		Grade II listed (1121276). Architect: Alfred Waterhouse.
Dartford	Dartford Civic Centre	More images	Kent	1975		
Darwen	Darwen Town Hall	More images	Lancashire	1882		Architect: Charles Bell of Bourne.
Daventry	The Moot Hall	More images	Northamptonshire	1769		Grade II* listed (1067667).
Dawley	Dawley Town Hall	More images	Shropshire	1873		Architect: Mr Patterson.
Deal	Deal Town Hall	More images	Kent	1803		Grade II listed (1363477). Architect: John Mathews.
Deddington	Deddington Town Hall	More images	Oxfordshire	1611		Grade II* listed (1300780).
Denton	Denton Town Hall	More images	Greater Manchester	1889		Architects: T. D. and J. Lindley.
Deptford	Deptford Town Hall	More images	Greater London	1905		Grade II listed (1193691). Architects: Henry Vaughan Lanchester, James Stewart and Edwin Alfred Rickards.
Derby	Council House	More images	Derbyshire	1949		Architect: Charles Aslin.
Derby	Derby Guildhall	More images	Derbyshire	1828		Grade II listed (1228604). Architects: Matthew Habershon and Henry Duesbury.
Devizes	Devizes Town Hall	More images	Wiltshire	1808		Grade II* listed (1262331). Architect: Thomas Baldwin of Bath.
Devizes	Old Town Hall	More images	Wiltshire	1752		Grade II* listed (1252446). Architect: Lawrence.
Devonport	Devonport Guildhall	More images	Devon	1824		Grade I listed (1322009). Architect: John Foulston.
Dewsbury	Dewsbury Town Hall	More images	West Yorkshire	1889		Grade II listed (1134707). Architects: Henry Holtom and George Arthur Fox.
Diss	Diss Town Hall	More images	Norfolk	1830		Grade II listed (1170035).
Doncaster	Doncaster Civic Office	More images	South Yorkshire	2012		Architects: Cartwright Pickard.
Dorchester	Municipal Buildings	More images	Dorset	1848		Grade II* listed (1110585). Architects: Benjamin Ferrey of London.
Dover	Dover Town Hall	More images	Kent	1203		Grade I listed (1069499).
Downham Market	Downham Market Town Hall	More images	Norfolk	1887		Grade II listed (1342634). Architect: John Johnson.
Driffield	Driffield Town Hall	More images	East Riding of Yorkshire	1841		Architect: Henry Francis Lockwood of Hull.
Droitwich Spa	Old Town Hall, Droitwich Spa	More images	Worcestershire	1826		Grade II listed (1095978).
Dronfield	Dronfield Civic Hall	More images	Derbyshire	1999		
Dudley	Dudley Council House	More images	West Midlands	1935		Grade II listed (1393758). Architects: Harvey and Wicks.
Dukinfield	Dukinfield Town Hall	More images	Greater Manchester	1901		Grade II listed (1403441). Architect: John Eaton, Sons and Cantrell.
Dulverton	Dulverton Town Hall	More images	Somerset	1866		Grade II listed (1247925).
Dunstable	Dunstable Municipal Offices	More images	Bedfordshire	1747		Grade II listed (1138223).
Dunwich	Old Town Hall, Dunwich	More images	Suffolk	1705		Grade II listed (1198313).
Durham	Durham Town Hall	More images	County Durham	1665		Grade II* listed (1160184). Architect: Philip Charles Hardwick of London.
Dursley	Dursley Town Hall	More images	Gloucestershire	1738		Grade II* listed (1220689).
Ealing	Ealing Town Hall	More images	Greater London	1888		Grade II listed (1358791). Architect: Charles Jones.
Ealing	Old Town Hall, Ealing	More images	Greater London	1874		Grade II listed (1189300). Architect: Charles Jones.
Earlestown	Earlestown Town Hall	More images	Merseyside	1893		Grade II listed (1392639). Architect: Thomas Beesley.
Easingwold	Easingwold Town Hall	More images	North Yorkshire	1864		Architect: Edward Taylor.
East Barnet	East Barnet Town Hall	More images	Greater London	1892		Locally listed. Architect: Frederick William Shenton.
Eastbourne	Eastbourne Town Hall	More images	East Sussex	1886	40 metres (131 ft)	Grade II listed (1043621). Architect: William Tadman-Faulkes.
East Cowes	East Cowes Town Hall	More images	Isle of Wight	1897		Locally listed. Architect: James Newman.
Eastleigh	Eastleigh Town Hall	More images	Hampshire	1899		Architects: Mitchell, Son and Gutteridge.
Eccles	Eccles Town Hall	More images	Greater Manchester	1881		Architect: John Lowe.
Egremont	Egremont Town Hall	More images	Cumbria	1890		Grade II listed (1086707).
Elland	Elland Town Hall	More images	West Yorkshire	1888		Grade II listed (1248018). Architect: Charles Frederick Luke Horsfall.
Ellesmere	Old Town Hall, Ellesmere	More images	Shropshire	1833		Grade II listed (1055513). Architect: Edward Haycock of Shrewsbury.
Ellesmere Port	Ellesmere Port Council Offices	More images	Cheshire	1969		
Emsworth	Emsworth Town Hall	More images	Hampshire	1790		Architects: John Painter and John Sueter.
Enfield	Enfield Civic Centre	More images	Greater London	1961	49 metres (161 ft)	Architects: Eric G Broughton & Associates.
Epping	Epping Civic Offices	More images	Essex	1992		Grade II listed (1451630). Architects: Richard Reid and Associates.
Epping	Old Town Hall, Epping	More images	Essex	1863		
Epsom	Epsom Town Hall	More images	Surrey	1934		Architects: Hubert Moore Fairweather and William Alfred Pite.
Erdington	Erdington Town Hall	More images	West Midlands	1727		Grade II listed (1076201).
Erith	Erith Town Hall	More images	Greater London	1932		Architect: Harold Hind.
Esher	Esher Town Hall	More images	Surrey	1762		Grade II listed (1030194).
Eton	Eton Council Offices	More images	Berkshire	1904		Locally listed.
Evesham	Evesham Town Hall	More images	Worcestershire	1586		Grade II listed (1350104). Architect: George Hunt.
Exeter	Exeter Guildhall	More images	Devon	1470		Grade I listed (1103905) and Scheduled Ancient Monument.
Exmouth	Exmouth Town Hall	More images	Devon	1960		
Eye	Eye Town Hall	More images	Suffolk	1857		Grade II* listed (1316536). Architect: Edward Buckton Lamb of London.
Failsworth	Failsworth Town Hall	More images	Greater Manchester	1909		Architects: Ernest Ogden and Percy Cartwright Hoy.
Falmouth	Former Town Hall and Fire Station, Falmouth	More images	Cornwall	1866		Grade II listed (1269980). Architects: Charles Reeves and Lewis George Butcher.
Falmouth	Municipal Buildings, Falmouth	More images	Cornwall	1896		Grade II listed (1269979). Architect: William Henry Tressider.
Falmouth	Old Town Hall, Falmouth	More images	Cornwall	1710		Grade II* listed (1270068).
Faringdon	Old Town Hall, Faringdon	More images	Oxfordshire	1660		Grade II* listed (1048440).
Farnborough	Farnborough Town Hall	More images	Hampshire	1897		Grade II listed (1303102). Architect: George Campbell Sherrin.
Farnham	Farnham Town Hall	More images	Surrey	1903		Architect: Paxton Hood Watson.
Farnworth	Farnworth Town Hall	More images	Greater Manchester	1909		Grade II listed (1113252). Architect: Bradshaw Gass & Hope.
Faversham	Faversham Guildhall	More images	Kent	1574		Grade II* listed (1343844). Architect: Charles Drayson.
Felixstowe	Felixstowe Town Hall	More images	Suffolk	1892		Architect: George Horton.
Felling	Felling Town Hall	More images	Tyne and Wear	1902		Grade II listed (1299836). Architect: Henry Miller.
Fenton	Fenton Town Hall	More images	Staffordshire	1889		Architect: Robert Scrivener & Son.
Ferryhill	Ferryhill Town Hall	More images	County Durham	1867		
Filey	Filey Council Offices	More images	North Yorkshire	1898		
Finsbury	Finsbury Town Hall	More images	Greater London	1895		Grade II* listed (1293112). Now the home of Urdang Academy. Architect: C. Evans-Vaughan.
Fleetwood	Fleetwood Town Hall	More images	Lancashire	1836		Grade II listed (1072398). Architect: Decimus Burton of London.
Folkestone	Folkestone Town Hall	More images	Kent	1861		Grade II listed (1061218). Architects: Joseph Messenger and Messrs Whichford and Blandford.
Fordingbridge	Fordingbridge Town Hall	More images	Hampshire	1877		Grade II listed (1094875).
Fordwich	Fordwich Town Hall	More images	Kent	1544		Grade II* listed (1085670).
Fowey	Fowey Town Hall	More images	Cornwall	1787		Grade II listed (1290368).
Friern Barnet	Friern Barnet Town Hall	More images	Greater London	1941		Grade II listed (1360822). Architect: Sir John Brown, A E Henson and Partners.
Fulham	Fulham Town Hall	More images	Greater London	1890		Grade II* listed (1191939). Architect: George Edwards.
Gainsborough	Gainsborough Town Hall	More images	Lincolnshire	1892		Architects: Meeke and Bramall.
Garstang	Garstang Town Hall	More images	Lancashire	1764		Grade II listed (1072906).
Gateshead	Old Town Hall, Gateshead	More images	Tyne and Wear	1870		Architect: John Johnstone.
Gateshead	Gateshead Civic Centre	More images	Tyne and Wear	1987		Architect: D W Robson.
Glastonbury	Glastonbury Town Hall	More images	Somerset	1814		Grade II* listed (1057904). Architect: Joseph Beard.
Glossop	Glossop Town Hall	More images	Derbyshire	1838		Grade II listed (1384269). Architect: Matthew Ellison Hadfield.
Gloucester	Gloucester Guildhall	More images	Gloucestershire	1892		Grade II listed (1271663). Architect: George H Hunt.
Godalming	Godalming Borough Hall	More images	Surrey	1861		Architect: Henry Peak.
Godalming	The Pepperpot	More images	Surrey	1814		Grade II listed (1044496). Architect: John Perry.
Godmanchester	Godmanchester Town Hall	More images	Cambridgeshire	1844		Grade II listed (1161502).
Gosforth	Gosforth Council Offices	More images	Tyne and Wear	1895		
Gosport	Gosport Town Hall	More images	Hampshire	1964		Architects: W. H. Saunders & Son.
Grampound	Grampound Town Hall	More images	Cornwall	1614		Grade II listed (1144042).
Grantham	Grantham Guildhall	More images	Lincolnshire	1869		Grade II listed (1360282). Architect: William Watkins of Lincoln.
Grassington	Grassington Town Hall	More images	North Yorkshire	1855		
Gravesend	Gravesham Civic Centre	More images	Kent	1968		Architect: Brian Richards.
Gravesend	Gravesend Town Hall	More images	Kent	1764		Grade II* listed (1054761). Architects: Charles Sloane and Amon Henry Wilds.
Grays	Thurrock Town Hall	More images	Essex	1986		
Great Dunmow	Old Town Hall, Great Dunmow	More images	Essex	1578		Grade II listed (1142444).
Great Harwood	Great Harwood Town Hall	More images	Lancashire	1900		Grade II listed (1206022). Architects: Briggs and Wolstenholme.
Great Malvern	Council House, Malvern	More images	Worcestershire	1880		Grade II* listed (1156369). Architect: Henry Haddon.
Great Torrington	Great Torrington Town Hall	More images	Devon	1861		Grade II listed (1332997).
Great Yarmouth	Great Yarmouth Town Hall	More images	Norfolk	1882	34 metres (112 ft)	Grade II* listed (1246969). Architect: John Bond Pearce of Norwich.
Greenwich	Greenwich Town Hall	More images	Greater London	1939	56 metres (184 ft)	Grade II listed (1213855). Architect: Clifford Culpin.
Greenwich	Old Town Hall, Greenwich	More images	Greater London	1877		Architect: William Wallen.
Grimsby	Grimsby Town Hall	More images	Lincolnshire	1863		Grade II listed (1379888). Architects: Bellamy and Hardy and John Giles.
Guildford	Guildford Guildhall	More images	Surrey	1550		Grade I listed (1180101).
Guisborough	Guisborough Town Hall	More images	North Yorkshire	1821		Grade II listed (1329572).
Guiseley	Guiseley Town Hall	More images	West Yorkshire	1867		Architects: Knowles and Wilcock.
Hackney	Hackney Town Hall	More images	Greater London	1937		Grade II listed (1235869). Architects: Lanchester and Lodge.
Hackney	Old Town Hall, Hackney	More images	Greater London	1802		Grade II listed (1226899).
Hadleigh	Hadleigh Town Hall	More images	Suffolk	1851		Grade II listed (1194514). Architect: William Parkes Ribbans.
Halifax	Halifax Town Hall	More images	West Yorkshire	1863	55 metres (180 ft)	Grade II* listed (1314024). Architect: Charles Barry.
Haltwhistle	Old Town Hall, Haltwhistle	More images	Northumberland	1861		Grade II listed (1370315).
Hammersmith	Hammersmith Town Hall	More images	Greater London	1939		Grade II listed (1079785). Architect: Ernest Berry Webber.
Hampstead	Hampstead Town Hall	More images	Greater London	1878		Grade II listed (1378818). Architects: Henry Edward Kendall and Frederick Mew.
Handsworth	Old Town Hall, Handsworth	More images	West Midlands	1460		Grade II listed (1075634).
Handsworth	Council House	More images	West Midlands	1879		Grade II listed (1221174). Architects: Alexander & Henman of Stockton-on-Tees.
Hanley	Hanley Town Hall	More images	Staffordshire	1869		Grade II listed (1297932). Architect: Robert Scrivener.
Haringey	Haringey Civic Centre	More images	Greater London	1958		Grade II listed (1454719). Architect: Sir John Brown, A E Henson and Partners.
Harlow	Harlow Civic Centre	More images	Essex	2004		
Harpenden	Harpenden Town Hall	More images	Hertfordshire	1994		
Harrogate	Harrogate Council Offices	More images	North Yorkshire	1931		Architect: Leonard Clarke.
Harrow	Harrow Civic Centre	More images	Greater London	1973		Architect: Eric G. Broughton.
Hartlepool (The Headland)	Hartlepool Borough Hall	More images	County Durham	1865		Grade II listed (1263357). Architect: Charles J. Adams.
Hartlepool	West Hartlepool Town Hall	More images	County Durham	1897		Grade II listed (1250394). Architect: Henry Cheers.
Harwich	Harwich Guildhall	More images	Essex	1769		Grade I listed (1298482).
Haslemere	Haslemere Town Hall	More images	Surrey	1814		Grade II listed (1244092).
Hastings	Hastings Town Hall	More images	East Sussex	1881		Grade II listed (1245060). Architect: Henry Ward.
Havant	Havant Town Hall	More images	Hampshire	1870		Architect: Richard William Drew.
Romford	Havering Town Hall	More images	Greater London	1937		Grade II listed (1245551). Architects: Herbert R. Collins and Antoine Englebert O. Geens.
Hawkshead	Hawkshead Town Hall	More images	Cumbria	1790		Grade II listed (1121554). Architect: Francis Webster.
Haywards Heath	Haywards Heath Town Hall	More images	West Sussex	1990		
Heanor	Heanor Town Hall	More images	Derbyshire	1867		Grade II listed (1158590).
Hebden Bridge	Hebden Bridge Town Hall	More images	West Yorkshire	1898		Grade II listed (1230338). Architects: Sutcliffe and Sutcliffe.
Hedon	Hedon Town Hall	More images	East Riding of Yorkshire	1693		Grade II* listed (1083554).
Helmsley	Helmsley Town Hall	More images	North Yorkshire	1901		Grade II listed (1308328). Architect: Temple Moore.
Helston	Helston Guildhall	More images	Cornwall	1839		Grade II* listed (1196492). Architect: George Wightwick.
Hemel Hempstead	Old Town Hall, Hemel Hempstead	More images	Hertfordshire	1851		Grade II listed (1342196). Architect: George Low.
Hendon	Hendon Town Hall	More images	Greater London	1901		Grade II listed (1294762). Architect: Thomas Henry Watson.
Henley-on-Thames	Henley Town Hall	More images	Oxfordshire	1901		Grade II* listed (1047802). Architect: Henry Hare.
Hereford	Hereford Town Hall	More images	Herefordshire	1904		Grade II* listed (1279640). Architect: Henry Cheers.
Hessle	Hessle Town Hall	More images	East Riding of Yorkshire	1897		
Hexham	Hexham Town Hall	More images	Northumberland	1866		Grade II listed (1042607). Architect: John Johnstone.
Higham Ferrers	Higham Ferrers Town Hall	More images	Northampronshire	1809		Grade II listed (1371873).
High Wycombe	High Wycombe Guildhall	More images	Buckinghamshire	1757		Grade II listed (1332349). Architect: Henry Keene.
High Wycombe	High Wycombe Town Hall	More images	Buckinghamshire	1904		Grade II listed (1246257). Architect: Charles Bateman and Alfred Hale.
High Wycombe	Municipal Offices, High Wycombe	More images	Buckinghamshire	1932		Architects: Richard Greaves Brocklehurst and Charles Cowles-Voysey.
Hillingdon	Hillingdon Civic Centre	More images	Greater London	1979		Grade II listed (1451218). Architect: Andrew Derbyshire.
Hinckley	Hinckley Hub	More images	Leicestershire	2013		Architect: MRP.
Hindley	Hindley Town Hall	More images	Greater Manchester	1903		Architects: Heaton, Ralph and Heaton.
Hitchin	Hitchin Town Hall	More images	Hertfordshire	1901		Grade II listed (1394494). Architects: Edward Mountford and Thomas Lucas.
Holborn	Holborn Town Hall	More images	Greater London	1894		Grade II listed (1378893). Architects: William Rushworth (1894 building); Septimus Warwick and H Austen Hall (1908 extension).
Holmfirth	Holmfirth Civic Hall	More images	West Yorkshire	1842		Grade II listed (1227986).
Horbury	Horbury Town Hall	More images	West Yorkshire	1903		Locally listed. Architects: Walter Hanstock & Son.
Horncastle	Horncastle Town Hall	More images	Lincolnshire	1901		
Hornsea	Hornsea Town Hall	More images	East Riding of Yorkshire	1875		Architect: John K. James
Hornsey	Hornsey Town Hall	More images	Greater London	1935		Grade II* listed (1263688). Architect: Reginald Uren.
Horsham	Horsham Town Hall	More images	West Sussex	1812		Grade II listed (1027519).
Hounslow	Hounslow House	More images	Greater London	2019		Architects: Sheppard Robson
Hove	Hove Town Hall	More images	East Sussex	1974		Architect: John Wells-Thorpe.
Howden	Howden Town Hall	More images	East Riding of Yorkshire	1851		Architects: John Grey Weightman and Matthew Ellison Hadfield.
Hoylake	Hoylake Town Hall	More images	Merseyside	1898		
Hoyland	Hoyland Town Hall	More images	South Yorkshire	1972		
Huddersfield	Huddersfield Town Hall	More images	West Yorkshire	1881		Grade II listed (1231723). Architect: John Henry Abbey.
Hugh Town	Isles of Scilly Town Hall	More images	Cornwall	1889		Grade II listed (1219066); Architect: J. Goodfellow.
Kingston upon Hull	Hull City Hall	More images	East Riding of Yorkshire	1909		Grade II* listed (1197685). Architect: Joseph Hirst.
Kingston upon Hull	Hull Guildhall	More images	East Riding of Yorkshire	1914	41 metres (135 ft)	Grade II* listed (1279708). Architect: Edwin Cooper.
Hungerford	Hungerford Town Hall	More images	Berkshire	1871		Grade II listed (1210595). Architect: John Money.
Hunstanton	Hunstanton Town Hall	More images	Norfolk	1896		Grade II listed (1171478). Architect: George Skipper.
Huntingdon	Huntingdon Town Hall	More images	Cambridgeshire	1745		Grade II* listed (1128584). Architect: Benjamin Timbrell.
Huyton	Huyton Municipal Building	More images	Merseyside	1963		Architect: Henry Kay Pilkinton.
Hyde	Hyde Town Hall	More images	Greater Manchester	1885		Grade II listed (1393594). Architect: James William Beaumont.
Hythe	Hythe Town Hall	More images	Kent	1794		Grade II* listed (1068981). Architect: William Tritton.
Ilchester	Ilchester Town Hall	More images	Somerset	1816		Grade II listed (1057301).
Ilfracombe	Old Town Hall, Ilfracombe	More images	Devon	1862		Grade II listed (1293104).
Ilkeston	Ilkeston Town Hall	More images	Derbyshire	1868		Grade II listed (1280610). Architect: Richard Charles Sutton.
Ilkley	Ilkley Town Hall	More images	West Yorkshire	1908		Grade II listed (1314237). Architect: William Bakewell.
Ince-in-Makerfield	Ince-in-Makerfield Town Hall	More images	Greater Manchester	1903		Architects: Heaton, Ralph and Heaton.
Ipswich	Ipswich Town Hall	More images	Suffolk	1868		Grade II listed (1206572). Now an arts centre and events venue. Architects: Bellamy and Hardy of Lincoln.
Islington	Islington Town Hall	More images	Greater London	1930		Grade II listed (1297950). Architect: E.C.P. Monson.
Ivybridge	Ivybridge Town Hall	More images	Devon	1995		
Jarrow	Jarrow Town Hall	More images	Tyne and Wear	1904		Grade II listed (1299416). Architect: Fred Rennoldson.
Keighley	Keighley Town Hall	More images	West Yorkshire	1902		Grade II listed (1134150). Architect: John Haggas.
Kendal	Kendal Town Hall	More images	Cumbria	1827		Grade II listed (1318980). Architect: Francis Webster.
Kensington	Kensington Town Hall	More images	Greater London	1976		Architect: Sir Basil Spence.
Keswick	The Moot Hall	More images	Cumbria	1813		Grade II* listed (1137345).
Kettering	Kettering Municipal Offices	More images	Northamptonshire	1913		Architect: John Alfred Gotch.
Keynsham	Keynsham Civic Centre	More images	Somerset	2015		Architect: AHR.
Kidderminster	Kidderminster Town Hall	More images	Worcestershire	1877		Grade II listed (1348650). Architect: J. T. Meredith.
Kidsgrove	Kidsgrove Town Hall	More images	Staffordshire	1898		Locally listed. Architects: Wood and Hutchings.
Kingsbridge	Kingsbridge Town Hall	More images	Devon	1850		Grade II listed (1107527).
King's Lynn	King's Lynn Guildhall	More images	Norfolk	1428		Grade I listed (1211953).
Kingston upon Thames	Kingston upon Thames Guildhall	More images	Greater London	1935		Grade II listed (1080065). Architect: Maurice Webb.
Kington	Kington Town Hall	More images	Herefordshire	1820		Grade II listed (1297574, 1208453 and 1293133). Architect: Benjamin Wishlade.
Kirkburton	Kirkburton Town Hall	More images	West Yorkshire	1835		Grade II listed (1135339).
Kirton in Holland	Kirton in Holland Town Hall	More images	Lincolnshire	1912		Architect: Henry Kidd.
Kirton in Lindsey	Kirton in Lindsey Town Hall	More images	Lincolnshire	1899		Grade II listed (1160694). Architect: J. K. Broughton.
Knaresborough	Old Town Hall, Knaresborough	More images	North Yorkshire	1862		Grade II listed (1315653). Architect: John Child.
Knottingley	Knottingley Town Hall	More images	West Yorkshire	1865		Architect: Shaw and Weightman.
Knutsford	Knutsford Town Hall	More images	Cheshire	1871		Grade II listed (1378496). Architect: Alfred Waterhouse.
Lambeth	Lambeth Town Hall	More images	Greater London	1908	41 metres (135 ft)	Grade II listed (1080534). Architects: Septimus Warwick and H. Austen Hall.
Lambeth	Old Town Hall, Kennington Road	More images	Greater London	1853		Grade II listed (1080399). Architects: Raymond Willshire and Robert Parris.
Lancaster	Lancaster Town Hall	More images	Lancashire	1909		Grade II* listed (1194923). Architects: Edward Mountford and Thomas Lucas.
Lancaster	Old Town Hall, Lancaster	More images	Lancashire	1783	55 metres (180 ft)	Grade II* listed (1194971). Architect: Major Jarrett.
Langport	Langport Town Hall	More images	Somerset	1732		Grade II listed (1056610).
Launceston	Launceston Guildhall and Town Hall	More images	Cornwall	1887		Grade II listed (1297841). Architects: Otho B. Peter and G. Hine.
Leamington Spa	Leamington Spa Town Hall	More images	Warwickshire	1884	44 metres (144 ft)	Grade II listed (1381441). Architect: John Cundall.
Leatherhead	Council Offices	More images	Surrey	1935		Grade II listed (1113328). Architects: C. H. Rose and H. R. Gardner.
Ledbury	Ledbury Town Hall	More images	Herefordshire	1617		Grade I listed (1349392). Architect: John Abel.
Leeds	Leeds Civic Hall	More images	West Yorkshire	1933	52 metres (171 ft)	Grade II* listed (1255781). Architect: Vincent Harris.
Leeds	Leeds Town Hall	More images	West Yorkshire	1858	69 metres (226 ft)	Grade I listed (1255772). Architect: Cuthbert Brodrick of Hull.
Leicester	Leicester Guildhall	More images	Leicestershire	1390		Grade I listed (1361405). Now a museum and performance venue.
Leicester	Leicester Town Hall	More images	Leicestershire	1876	44 metres (144 ft)	Grade II* listed (1074780). Architect: Francis Hames.
Leicester	City Hall, Leicester	More images	Leicestershire	1938		Locally listed. Architects: Leonard Barnish and Spencer Silcock.
Leigh	Leigh Town Hall	More images	Greater Manchester	1907		Grade II listed (1163007). Architect: James Caldwell Prestwich.
Leighton Buzzard	Old Town Hall, Leighton Buzzard	More images	Bedfordshire	1851		Grade II listed (1114566).
Letchworth	Letchworth Town Hall	More images	Hertfordshire	1935		Grade II listed (1393610). Architects: Robert Bennett and Wilson Bidwell.
Levenshulme	Levenshulme Town Hall	More images	Greater Manchester	1899		Architect: James Jepson.
Lewes	Lewes Town Hall	More images	East Sussex	1893		Grade II listed (1353072). Architect: Samuel Denman.
Lewisham	Lewisham Town Hall	More images	Greater London	1932		Grade II listed (1253065). Architect: Bradshaw Gass & Hope.
Leyburn	Leyburn Town Hall	More images	North Yorkshire	1857		Grade II listed (1178994).
Leyton	Leyton Town Hall	More images	Greater London	1895		Grade II listed (1065587). Architect: John Johnson.
Lichfield	Lichfield Guildhall	More images	Staffordshire	1848		Grade II listed (1187740). Architect: Joseph Potter Jnr.
Limehouse	Limehouse Town Hall	More images	Greater London	1881		Grade II listed (1240047). Architects: Arthur and Christopher Harston.
Lincoln	Lincoln Guildhall	More images	Lincolnshire	1520		Grade I listed (1388605)
Lincoln	Lincoln City Hall	More images	Lincolnshire	1973		Architects: John Roberts Associates.
Liskeard	Liskeard Guildhall	More images	Cornwall	1858		Grade II listed (1206610); Architects: Charles Reeves and Lewis George Butcher.
Litherland	Litherland Town Hall	More images	Merseyside	1940		Architect: Gerald de Courcy Fraser.
Little Bolton	Little Bolton Town Hall	More images	Greater Manchester	1828		Grade II listed (1388257). Architects: John Thompson.
Liverpool	Liverpool Town Hall	More images	Merseyside	1754	32 metres (105 ft)	Grade I listed (1360219). Architect: John Wood the Elder of Bath.
Liverpool	Municipal Buildings	More images	Merseyside	1868	61 metres (200 ft)	Grade II* listed (1068281). Architect: John Weightman; completed by ER Robson.
Liversedge	Liversedge Town Hall	More images	West Yorkshire	1880		Architect: William Ellis.
Lockwood	Lockwood Town Hall	More images	West Yorkshire	1866		Grade II listed (1239516).
Loddon	Old Town Hall, Loddon	More images	Norfolk	1870		Grade II listed (1169370).
Loftus	Loftus Town Hall	More images	North Yorkshire	1879		Grade II listed (1136562). Architect: Edward Robert Robson.
Long Eaton	Long Eaton Town Hall	More images	Derbyshire	1778		Grade II* listed (1204191). Architect: Joseph Pickford.
Longton	Longton Town Hall	More images	Staffordshire	1844		Grade II listed (1297944). Architect: John Burrill.
Looe	Looe Guildhall	More images	Cornwall	1877	27 metres (89 ft)	Grade II listed (1280863). Architect: John Ford Gould.
Looe	The Old Guildhall	More images	Cornwall	1450		Grade II* listed (1201113).
Lostwithiel	Lostwithiel Guildhall	More images	Cornwall	1740		Grade II listed (1144227)
Loughborough	Loughborough Town Hall	More images	Leicestershire	1855		Grade II listed (1361164). Architect: William Slater.
Louth	Louth Town Hall	More images	Lincolnshire	1854		Grade II listed (1063257). Architect: Pearson Bellamy.
Lowestoft	Lowestoft Town Hall	More images	Suffolk	1860		Grade II listed (1279943). Architect: John Louth Clemence.
Ludlow	Ludlow Guildhall	More images	Shropshire	1411		Grade I listed (1211188).
Luton	Luton Town Hall	More images	Bedfordshire	1936	44 metres (144 ft)	Grade II listed (1376193). Architects: Bradshaw Gass & Hope.
Lutterworth	Lutterworth Town Hall	More images	Leicestershire	1836		Grade II listed (1211129). Architect: Joseph Hansom.
Lydd	Lydd Guildhall	More images	Kent	1792		Grade II listed (1338208).
Lydney	Lydney Town Hall	More images	Gloucestershire	1889		Locally listed. Architect: William Howard Seth-Smith
Lyme Regis	Lyme Regis Guildhall	More images	Dorset	1889		Grade II* listed (1228691). Architect: George Vialls.
Lynton	Lynton Town Hall	More images	Devon	1900		Grade II listed (1206608). Architects: Read and Macdonald.
Lytham St Annes	Lytham St Annes Town Hall	More images	Lancashire	1898		Locally listed.
Macclesfield	Macclesfield Town Hall	More images	Cheshire	1824		Grade II* listed (1206935). Architect: Francis Goodwin of Norfolk.
Maidenhead	Maidenhead Town Hall	More images	Berkshire	1962		Architects: North & Partners and Sir Hubert Worthington
Maidstone	Maidstone Town Hall	More images	Kent	1763		Grade II* listed (1086305).
Maldon	The Moot Hall	More images	Essex	1420		Grade I listed (1256887).
Malmesbury	Malmesbury Town Hall	More images	Wiltshire	1854		Grade II listed (1269481).
Malton	Malton Town Hall	More images	North Yorkshire	1749		Grade II listed (1282440).
Manchester	Manchester Town Hall	More images	Greater Manchester	1877	85 metres (279 ft)	Grade I listed (1207469). Architect: Alfred Waterhouse.
Manchester	Manchester Town Hall Extension	More images	Greater Manchester	1938		Grade II* listed (1197917). Architect: Vincent Harris.
Mansfield	Old Town Hall, Mansfield	More images	Nottinghamshire	1836		Grade II* listed (1207179). Architect: William Adams Nicholson.
Marazion	Marazion Town Hall	More images	Cornwall	1871		Grade II listed (1327585).
March	March Town Hall	More images	Cambridgeshire	1900	33.5 metres (110 ft)	Grade II listed (1216349). Architect: W. T. Unwin.
Margate	Margate Town Hall	More images	Kent	1898		Grade II listed (1351074).
Market Deeping	Market Deeping Town Hall	More images	Lincolnshire	1835		Grade II listed (1317350). Architect: Thomas Pilkington.
Market Harborough	Market Harborough Town Hall	More images	Leicestershire	1788		Grade II listed (1074426).
Market Weighton	Market Weighton Town Hall	More images	East Riding of Yorkshire	1897		Architects: Penty & Penty.
Marlborough	Marlborough Town Hall	More images	Wiltshire	1902		Grade II listed (1242852). Architect: Charles Ponting.
Marlow	Marlow Town Hall	More images	Buckinghamshire	1807		Grade II* listed (1159570). Architect: Samuel Wyatt.
Martock	Martock Town Hall	More images	Somerset	1785		Grade II listed (1225758).
Marylebone	Marylebone Town Hall	More images	Greater London	1920		Grade II* listed (1222688). Architect: Sir Edwin Cooper.
Masham	Masham Town Hall	More images	North Yorkshire	1913		Grade II listed (1167212). Architect: John Houfe.
Matlock	Matlock Town Hall	More images	Derbyshire	1850		
Melksham	Melksham Town Hall	More images	Wiltshire	1847		Grade II listed (1194263). Architect: D. Jones.
Meltham	Meltham Town Hall	More images	West Yorkshire	1898		Architect: William Carter.
Morden	Merton Civic Centre	More images	Greater London	1960	49 metres (161 ft)	Architect: A. Green.
Middlesbrough	Middlesbrough Town Hall	More images	North Yorkshire	1889	52 metres (171 ft)	Grade II* listed (1136659). Architect: GG Hoskins.
Middlesbrough	Old Town Hall, Middlesbrough	More images	North Yorkshire	1846		Grade II listed (1139853). Architect: William Lambie Moffatt of Doncaster.
Middleton	Middleton Town Hall	More images	Greater Manchester	1965		Architect: Tom Ellis of Lyons Israel Ellis.
Middlewich	Middlewich Town Hall	More images	Cheshire	1898		
Midhurst	Old Town Hall, Midhurst	More images	West Sussex	1551		Grade II listed (1234718).
Midsomer Norton	Midsomer Norton Town Hall	More images	Somerset	1860		Grade II listed (1115167). Architect: Foster and Wood.
Milborne Port	Milborne Port Town Hall	More images	Somerset	1720		Grade II listed (1174867).
Millom	Old Town Hall, Millom	More images	Cumbria	1879		
Milnrow	Milnrow Town Hall	More images	Greater Manchester	1888		
Milton Keynes	Milton Keynes Civic Offices	More images	Buckinghamshire	1979		Architect: Faulkner Brown Hendy Watkinson Stonor.
Minehead	Minehead Town Hall	More images	Somerset	1902		Grade II listed (1279928). Architect: William John Tamlyn.
Mirfield	Mirfield Town Hall	More images	West Yorkshire	1868		Architects: Kirk and Sons.
Mitcham	Mitcham Town Hall	More images	Greater London	1887		Architect: Robert Masters Chart.
Mitcheldean	Mitcheldean Town Hall	More images	Gloucestershire	1710		Grade II listed (1299149).
Morecambe	Morecambe Town Hall	More images	Lancashire	1932		Grade II listed (1389539). Architects: Alfred Cross and Kenneth Cross.
Morley	Morley Town Hall	More images	West Yorkshire	1895	49 metres (161 ft)	Grade I listed (1135112). Architects: Henry Holtom and George Arthur Fox.
Morpeth	Morpeth Town Hall	More images	Northumberland	1714		Grade II listed (1042730). Architect: John Vanbrugh.
Moreton-in-Marsh	Moreton-in-Marsh Town Hall	More images	Gloucestershire	1887		Grade II listed (1088683). Architects: Sir Ernest George and Harold Peto
Mossley	Mossley Town Hall	More images	Greater Manchester	1864		Grade II listed (1068044). Architect: William Williamson.
Much Wenlock	Much Wenlock Guildhall	More images	Shropshire	1557		Grade II* listed (1053794)
Nailsworth	Nailsworth Town Hall	More images	Gloucestershire	1868		
Needham Market	Old Town Hall, Needham Market	More images	Suffolk	1866		Grade II listed (1253656). Architect: Frederick Barnes.
Nelson	Nelson Town Hall	More images	Lancashire	1881		Architect: Alfred Waterhouse.
Neston	Neston Town Hall	More images	Cheshire	1889		Architect: David Walker.
Newark-on-Trent	Newark Town Hall	More images	Nottinghamshire	1776		Grade I listed (1196430). Architect: John Carr.
New Bolingbroke	New Bolingbroke Town Hall	More images	Lincolnshire	1823		Grade II listed (1063565).
Newbrough	Newbrough Town Hall	More images	Northumberland	1878		Grade II listed (1303483).
Newburn	Newburn Town Hall	More images	Tyne and Wear	1910		Grade II listed (1186074). Architect: Edward Cratney.
Newbury	Newbury Town Hall	More images	Berkshire	1881		Grade II listed (1210586). Architect: James H. Money.
Newcastle-under-Lyme	Newcastle-under-Lyme Guildhall	More images	Staffordshire	1713		Grade II listed (1196523).
Newcastle upon Tyne	Newcastle Civic Centre	More images	Tyne and Wear	1967	61 metres (200 ft)	Grade II* listed (1242692). Architect: George Kenyon.
Newcastle upon Tyne	Newcastle Guildhall	More images	Tyne and Wear	1655		Grade I listed (1120877). Architect: Robert Trollope.
East Ham	Newham Town Hall	More images	Greater London	1903	46 metres (151 ft)	Grade II* listed (1190712). Architect: Henry Cheers and Joseph Smith.
New Malden	New Malden Town Hall	More images	Greater London	1905		Architect: William Horace Pope.
Newmarket	Newmarket Town Hall	More images	Suffolk	1830		Grade II listed (1351290).
New Mills	New Mills Town Hall	More images	Derbyshire	1871		
New Milton	New Milton Town Hall	More images	Hampshire	2003		
Newport	Newport Town Hall	More images	Cornwall	1829		Grade II listed (1195995).
Newport	Newport Guildhall	More images	Isle of Wight	1816		Grade II* listed (1278563). Architect: John Nash.
Newport	Old Town Hall, Newport	More images	Shropshire	1860		Grade II listed (1367292). Architect: John Cobb Jr.
Newport	Newport Guildhall	More images	Shropshire	1400		Grade II* listed (1177807).
Newport Pagnell	Old Town Hall Chambers	More images	Buckinghamshire	1845		Grade II listed (1309947). Architect: Richard Sheppard.
New Romney	New Romney Town Hall	More images	Kent	1702		Grade II listed (1068989).
Newton Abbot	Old Town Hall, Newton Abbot	More images	Devon	1862		Grade II listed (1257148).
Newtown	Old Town Hall, Newtown	More images	Isle of Wight	1699		Grade II* listed (1209336).
Northallerton	Northallerton Town Hall	More images	North Yorkshire	1873		Grade II listed (1389344). Architects: John Ross and Robert Lamb.
Northampton	Northampton Guildhall	More images	Northamptonshire	1864		Grade II* listed (1052399). Architect: Edward William Godwin of London.
North Tawton	North Tawton Town Hall	More images	Devon	1849		Grade II listed (1105310).
Norwich	Norwich City Hall	More images	Norfolk	1938	56 metres (184 ft)	Grade II* listed (1210484). Architects: Charles Holloway James and Stephen Rowland Pierce.
Norwich	Norwich Guildhall	More images	Norfolk	1413		Grade I listed (1187384).
Nottingham	Nottingham Council House	More images	Nottinghamshire	1929	61 metres (200 ft)	Grade II* listed (1270582). Architect: Thomas Cecil Howitt.
Nuneaton	Nuneaton Town Hall	More images	Warwickshire	1934		Architects: Peacock & Bewley of Birmingham.
Oakengates	Oakengates Town Hall	More images	Shropshire	1968		Architect: Maurice Day.
Okehampton	Okehampton Town Hall	More images	Devon	1685		Grade II* listed (1105855).
Oldbury	Municipal Buildings	More images	West Midlands	1891		Architects: Wood and Kendrick of West Bromwich.
Oldham	Old Town Hall, Oldham	More images	Greater Manchester	1841		Grade II listed (1201655). Architect: George Woodhouse.
Oldham	Oldham Civic Centre	More images	Greater Manchester	1977	53 metres (174 ft)	Architect: Cecil Howitt & Partners.
Orford	Orford Town Hall	More images	Suffolk	1902		Grade II listed (1198392). Architects: Harry Sirr and Edwin Rope.
Ormskirk	Old Town Hall, Ormskirk	More images	Lancashire	1779		Grade II listed (1297311).
Ossett	Ossett Town Hall	More images	West Yorkshire	1908		Grade II listed (1184149). Architects: Walter Hanstock & Son.
Oswaldtwistle	Oswaldtwistle Town Hall	More images	Lancashire	1891		Architect: Robert Naisbitt Hunter.
Oswestry	Oswestry Guildhall	More images	Shropshire	1893		Grade II listed (1367321). Architect: Henry Cheers.
Otley	Otley Civic Centre	More images	West Yorkshire	1871		Grade II listed (1200204). Architect: Charles Fowler.
Ottery St Mary	Old Town Hall, Ottery St Mary	More images	Devon	1859		
Oundle	Old Town Hall, Oundle	More images	Northamptonshire	1830		Grade II listed (1372119).
Oxford	Oxford Town Hall	More images	Oxfordshire	1897		Grade II* listed (1047153). Architect: Henry Hare.
Padiham	Padiham Town Hall	More images	Lancashire	1938		Grade II listed (1237652). Architect: Bradshaw Gass & Hope.
Paignton	Old Town Hall, Paignton	More images	Devon	1870		Architect: John Tarring.
Painswick	Painswick Town Hall	More images	Gloucestershire	1840		Grade II listed (1091564).
Penistone	Penistone Town Hall	More images	South Yorkshire	1914		Architect: Henry R. Collins.
Penrith	Penrith Town Hall	More images	Cumbria	1906		Grade II listed (1420806). Architect: J. J. Knewstub.
Penryn	Penryn Town Hall	More images	Cornwall	1839		Grade II* listed (1280314).
Penzance	The Public Buildings	More images	Cornwall	1867		Grade II listed (1143145). Architect: John Matthews.
Pershore	Pershore Civic Centre	More images	Worcestershire	1991		
Pershore	Pershore Town Hall	More images	Worcestershire	1932		Architect: Henry Seccombe.
Pershore	Old Council Offices, Pershore	More images	Worcestershire	1800		Grade II* listed (1387076).
Peterborough	Peterborough Town Hall	More images	Cambridgeshire	1933		Architect: Ernest Berry Webber.
Peterborough	Peterborough Guildhall	More images	Cambridgeshire	1671		Grade II* listed (1126990). Architect: John Lovin.
Petersfield	Petersfield Festival Hall and Town Hall	More images	Hampshire	1935		Architects: Seely & Paget.
Petworth	Petworth Town Hall	More images	West Sussex	1793		Grade II* listed (1225590).
Pevensey	Pevensey Town Hall	More images	East Sussex	1540		Grade II listed (1182588).
Pickering	Pickering Memorial Hall	More images	North Yorkshire	1865		Grade II listed (1260382).
Plymouth	Plymouth Civic Centre	More images	Devon	1962		Grade II listed (1392038). Architect: Jellicoe, Ballantyne & Colleridge.
Plymouth	Plymouth Guildhall	More images	Devon	1874	50 metres (164 ft)	Grade II listed (1113280). Architects: Norman and Hine.
Plympton	Plympton Guildhall	More images	Devon	1688		Grade II* listed (1244435).
Pontefract	Pontefract Town Hall	More images	West Yorkshire	1882		Grade II listed (1184866). Architects: Henry Perkin and George Bertram Bulmer.
Pontefract	Old Town Hall, Pontefract	More images	West Yorkshire	1785		Grade II listed (1299877). Architect: Bernard Hartley I.
Poole	Poole Civic Centre	More images	Dorset	1932		Grade II listed (1465200). Architect: L. Magnus Austin.
Poole	Poole Guildhall	More images	Dorset	1761		Grade II* listed (1266739).
Poplar	Poplar Town Hall	More images	Greater London	1938		Grade II listed (1393151). Architects: Culpin and Son.
Poplar	Old Town Hall, Poplar	More images	Greater London	1870		Grade II listed (1260135). Architects: Walter Augustus Hills and Thomas Wayland Fletcher with Arthur and Christopher Harston.
Portslade	Portslade Town Hall	More images	East Sussex	1928		Locally listed. Architect: Gilbert Murray Simpson.
Portsmouth	Portsmouth Civic Offices	More images	Hampshire	1976		Architects: Harry Teggin and David Taylor.
Portsmouth	Portsmouth Guildhall	More images	Hampshire	1890	54 metres (177 ft)	Grade II listed (1104316). Architect: William Hill of Leeds.
Poulton-le-Fylde	Old Town Hall	More images	Lancashire	1910		
Prescot	Prescot Town Hall	More images	Merseyside	2014		
Preston	Preston Town Hall	More images	Lancashire	1934		Grade II listed (1207297). Architect: Sir Arnold Thornely.
Pudsey	Pudsey Town Hall	More images	West Yorkshire	1880		Architects: Hope and Jardine.
Purley	Purley Council Offices	More images	Greater London	1930		Grade II listed (1063902). Architects: W. B. Nicholls and Basil Hughes.
Queenborough	Queenborough Guildhall	More images	Kent	1793		Grade II listed (1258419).
Radcliffe	Radcliffe Town Hall	More images	Greater Manchester	1911		Locally listed. Architects: W. M. Gillow and R. Holt.
Rawtenstall	Rawtenstall Town Hall	More images	Lancashire	1876		Locally listed.
Reading	Reading Town Hall	More images	Berkshire	1875	50 metres (164 ft)	Grade II* listed (1113400). Architect: Alfred Waterhouse.
Ilford	Redbridge Town Hall	More images	Greater London	1901		Grade II listed (1390560). Architect: Ben Woollard.
Redditch	Redditch Town Hall	More images	Worcestershire	1982		Architect: Cassidy & Ashton Partners.
Redruth	Old Town Hall, Redruth	More images	Cornwall	1850		Grade II listed (1142565). Architect: Robert Blee.
Reepham	Reepham Town Hall	More images	Norfolk	1860		
Reigate	Reigate Town Hall	More images	Surrey	1901		Grade II listed (1260489). Architects: Macintosh and Newman.
Reigate	Old Town Hall, Reigate	More images	Surrey	1728		Grade II* listed (1188608).
Retford	Retford Town Hall	More images	Nottinghamshire	1868		Grade II listed (1370374). Architects: Bellamy and Hardy.
Richmond	Richmond Town Hall	More images	North Yorkshire	1756		Grade II listed (1240517). Architect: Thomas Atkinson.
Richmond upon Thames	Old Town Hall, Richmond	More images	Greater London	1893		Now the Museum of Richmond, library and art gallery.
Rickmansworth	Old Town Hall, Rickmansworth	More images	Hertfordshire	1869		Architect: Arthur Allum.
Ripley, Derbyshire	Ripley Town Hall	More images	Derbyshire	1881		Architect: George Eyre.
Ripley, North Yorkshire	Ripley Town Hall	More images	North Yorkshire	1854		Grade II listed (1174009).
Ripon	Ripon Town Hall	More images	North Yorkshire	1799		Grade II* listed (1174370). Architect: James Wyatt.
Rochdale	Rochdale Town Hall	More images	Greater Manchester	1871	58 metres (190 ft)	Grade I listed (1084275). Architects: William Henry Crossland and Alfred Waterhouse.
Rochester	Rochester Guildhall	More images	Kent	1697		Grade I listed (1186145).
Romsey	Romsey Town Hall	More images	Hampshire	1866		Architect: Alfred Bedborough.
Rotherham	Rotherham Town Hall	More images	South Yorkshire	1929		
Rothwell	Rothwell Market House	More images	Northamptonshire	1578		Grade I listed (1288812). Architect: John Thorpe.
Rothwell	Rothwell Town Hall	More images	West Yorkshire	1895		Architects: T. H. and W. E. Richardson.
Royston	Royston Town Hall	More images	Hertfordshire	1855		Locally listed.
Royton	Royton Town Hall	More images	Greater Manchester	1880		
Rugby	Rugby Town Hall	More images	Warwickshire	1961		Architect: Ernest Prestwich.
Runcorn	Runcorn Town Hall	More images	Cheshire	1856		Grade II listed (1104859). Architect: Charles Verelst.
Rushden	Council Buildings	More images	Northamptonshire	1906		Locally listed. Architect: William Madin.
Ryde	Ryde Town Hall	More images	Isle of Wight	1831		Grade II listed (1217046). Architect: James Sanderson.
Rye	Rye Town Hall	More images	East Sussex	1743		Grade II* listed (1251881). Architect: Andrew Jelfe.
Saffron Walden	Saffron Walden Town Hall	More images	Essex	1763		Grade II listed (1196219). Architect: Edward Burgess.
Sale	Sale Town Hall	More images	Greater Manchester	1915		
Salford	Salford Civic Centre	More images	Greater Manchester	1938	38 metres (125 ft)	Formerly Swinton Town Hall. Architects: Percy Thomas and Ernest Prestwich.
Salford	Salford Town Hall	More images	Greater Manchester	1827		Grade II listed (1386076). Architect: Richard Lane.
Salisbury	Salisbury Guildhall	More images	Wiltshire	1795		Grade II* listed (1242739). Architects: Sir Robert Taylor and William Pilkington.
Saltash	Saltash Guildhall	More images	Cornwall	1780		Grade II listed (1140371).
Sandbach	Sandbach Town Hall	More images	Cheshire	1890		Grade II listed (1130352). Architect: Thomas Bower.
Sandown	Sandown Town Hall	More images	Isle of Wight	1869		Grade II listed (1034283). Architect: Thomas Dowell.
Sandwich	Sandwich Guildhall	More images	Kent	1579		Grade II* listed (1069731).
Sandy	Sandy Town Hall	More images	Bedfordshire	1906		Architect: Alfred Ernest Anthony.
Scarborough	Scarborough Town Hall	More images	North Yorkshire	1844		Grade II listed (1273023). Originally built as a private home; converted to town hall in 1898–1903. Architect: Henry Wyatt or W B Stewart.
Scunthorpe	Scunthorpe Civic Centre	More images	Lincolnshire	1962		Grade II listed (1323702). Architects: Charles B. Pearson and Partners.
Seaford	Old Town Hall, Seaford	More images	East Sussex	1562		Grade II listed (1252581).
Seaton	Seaton Town Hall	More images	Devon	1904		
Selby	Selby Town Hall	More images	North Yorkshire	1862		
Settle	Settle Town Hall	More images	North Yorkshire	1832		Grade II listed (1132346). Architect: George Webster.
Shaftesbury	Shaftesbury Town Hall	More images	Dorset	1837		Grade II listed (1108741).
Shanklin	Shanklin Town Hall	More images	Isle of Wight	1878		Grade II listed (1393657). Architect: E. G. Cooper.
Sheffield	Sheffield Town Hall	More images	South Yorkshire	1897	61 metres (200 ft)	Grade I listed (1246902). Architect: Edward William Mountford of London.
Sheffield	Sheffield Old Town Hall	More images	South Yorkshire	1808		Grade II listed (1247500). Architect: Charles Watson of Wakefield.
Sheffield	Sheffield City Hall	More images	South Yorkshire	1932		Grade II* listed (1246548). Architect: Vincent Harris.
Sheringham	Sheringham Town Hall	More images	Norfolk	1912		Architects: Stanley Simons & Co.
Shipley	Shipley Town Hall	More images	West Yorkshire	1932		
Shoreditch	Shoreditch Town Hall	More images	Greater London	1866		Grade II listed (1235232). Architect: Caesar Augustus Long.
Shoreham-by-Sea	Shoreham Town Hall	More images	West Sussex	1830		Grade II listed (1027866). Architect: Sydney Smirke.
Shrewsbury	Old Guildhall, Shrewsbury	More images	Shropshire	1696		Grade II* listed (1270999).
Silsden	Silsden Town Hall	More images	West Yorkshire	1894		
Skegness	Skegness Town Hall	More images	Lincolnshire	1926		Grade II listed (1474562). Architect: William Henry Ansell.
Skipton	Skipton Town Hall	More images	North Yorkshire	1862		Grade II listed (1301634).
Slaithwaite	Slaithwaite Town Hall	More images	West Yorkshire	1892		Architect: James B. Eagland.
Slough	Slough Town Hall	More images	Berkshire	1937		Architects: Charles Holloway James and Stephen Rowland Pierce.
Smethwick	Smethwick Council House	More images	West Midlands	1907		Grade II listed (1342665). Architect: Frederick J. Gill.
Solihull	Old Council House, Solihull	More images	West Midlands	1876		Architect: J. A. Chatwin.
Somerton	Old Town Hall, Somerton	More images	Somerset	1688		Grade II listed (1346033).
Southall	Southall Town Hall	More images	Greater London	1898		Architect: Thomas Newall.
Southampton	Civic Centre including Southampton Guildhall	More images	Hampshire	1932–39		Grade II* listed (1092036). Architect: Ernest Berry Webber.
South Cave	South Cave Town Hall	More images	East Riding of Yorkshire	1796		Grade II listed (1203447).
Southend-on-Sea	Southend Civic Centre	More images	Essex	1967		Architect: Patrick Burridge.
Southgate	Southgate Town Hall	More images	Greater London	1893		Architect: Arthur Rowland Barker.
South Molton	South Molton Guildhall	More images	Devon	1743		Grade I listed (1106866).
Southport	Southport Town Hall	More images	Merseyside	1853		Grade II listed (1379678). Architect: Thomas Withnell.
South Shields	South Shields Town Hall	More images	Tyne and Wear	1910	47 metres (154 ft)	Grade II listed (1232325). Architect: Ernest Fatch.
Southwick	Old Town Hall, Southwick	More images	West Sussex	1906		Architect: George Walter Warr.
Southwold	Southwold Town Hall	More images	Suffolk	1810		Grade II listed (1384392).
Sowerby Bridge	Sowerby Bridge Town Hall	More images	West Yorkshire	1857		Grade II listed (1319977). Architects: William Perkin and Elisha Backhouse.
Spennymoor	Spennymoor Town Hall	More images	County Durham	1916		Architect: G. T. Wellburn.
Spilsby	Old Town Hall, Spilsby	More images	Lincolnshire	1764		Grade II listed (1063591).
Stafford	Borough Hall, Stafford	More images	Staffordshire	1877		Grade II listed (1195382). Architect: Henry Ward.
Staines	Staines Town Hall	More images	Surrey	1880		Grade II listed (1187053). Architect: John Johnson.
Stamford	Stamford Town Hall	More images	Lincolnshire	1779		Grade II* listed (1306544). Architect: Henry Tatam.
St Albans	St Albans Town Hall	More images	Hertfordshire	1826		Grade II listed (1296135). Architect: George Smith.
St Albans	The Moot Hall	More images	Hertfordshire	1570		Grade II listed (1103069).
Stanhope	Stanhope Town Hall	More images	County Durham	1849		
Lytham St Annes	St Anne's Public Offices	More images	Lancashire	1902		Grade II listed (1390771). Architect: Thomas Muirhead.
St Austell	St Austell Town Hall	More images	Cornwall	1844		Grade II* listed (1289697). Architect: Christopher Eales.
St Helens	St Helens Town Hall	More images	Merseyside	1876		
St Ives	St Ives Town Hall	More images	Cambridgeshire	1850		Grade II listed (1330649). Architect: George Allen.
St Ives	St Ives Guildhall	More images	Cornwall	1939		Locally listed. Architect: Geoffrey B. Drewitt.
St John's Chapel	Upper Weardale Town Hall	More images	County Durham	1868		
St Just in Penwith	Old Town Hall, St Just	More images	Cornwall	1862		
St Marychurch	St Marychurch Town Hall	More images	Devon	1883		Grade II listed (1208816).
Stepney	Stepney Town Hall	More images	Greater London	1860		Grade II listed (1242346). Architect: Andrew Wilson.
Steyning	Old Town Hall, Steyning	More images	West Sussex	1886		Grade II listed (1027267). Architect: Charles Dalby.
Stockbridge	Stockbridge Town Hall	More images	Hampshire	1790		Grade II* listed (1093093).
Stockport	Stockport Town Hall	More images	Greater Manchester	1908	40 metres (131 ft)	Grade II* listed (1067166). Architect: Brumwell Thomas.
Stocksbridge	Stocksbridge Town Hall	More images	South Yorkshire	1928		Architect: Henry Maynard Aitchison.
Stockton-on-Tees	Stockton-on-Tees Town Hall	More images	County Durham	1735		Grade II* listed (1139975).
Stoke Newington	Stoke Newington Town Hall	More images	Greater London	1937		Grade II listed (1253465). Architect: John Reginald Truelove.
Stoke-upon-Trent	Stoke-upon-Trent Town Hall	More images	Staffordshire	1834		Grade II listed (1297959). Architect: Henry Ward.
Stokesley	Stokesley Town Hall	More images	North Yorkshire	1853		Grade II listed (1315445).
Stourbridge	Stourbridge Town Hall	More images	West Midlands	1887		Grade II listed (1251260). Architect: Thomas Robinson.
Stourport-on-Severn	Stourport Civic Centre	More images	Worcestershire	1966		Architects: Andrews and Hazzard.
Stratford	Stratford Town Hall	More images	Greater London	1869	30.5 metres (100 ft)	Grade II listed (1080991). Architects: John Giles and Lewis Angell.
Stratford-upon-Avon	Stratford-upon-Avon Town Hall	More images	Warwickshire	1767		Grade II* listed (1298545). Architect: Robert Newman.
Stratford-upon-Avon	Stratford-upon-Avon Guildhall	More images	Warwickshire	1417		Grade I listed (1187780).
Stroud	Old Town Hall, Stroud	More images	Gloucestershire	1596		Grade II* listed (1267688).
Sudbury	Sudbury Town Hall	More images	Suffolk	1830		Grade II listed (1037452). Architect: John Johnston.
Sunderland	Sunderland Civic Centre	More images	Tyne and Wear	1970		Architects: Spence Bonnington & Collins.
Sunderland	City Hall, Sunderland	More images	Tyne and Wear	2021		Architects: FaulknerBrowns.
Surbiton	Surbiton Town Hall	More images	Greater London	1898		Grade II listed (1358440).
Sutton	Sutton Civic Offices	More images	Greater London	1975		Architect: Charles Sierakowski.
Sutton Coldfield	Sutton Coldfield Town Hall	More images	West Midlands	1865		Locally listed.
Sutton-in-Ashfield	Sutton-in-Ashfield Town Hall	More images	Nottinghamshire	1889		Architect: J. P. Adlington.
Swadlincote	Swadlincote Town Hall	More images	Derbyshire	1861		Grade II listed (1334526).
Swaffham	Swaffham Town Hall	More images	Norfolk	1810		Grade II listed (1269635).
Swanage	Swanage Town Hall	More images	Dorset	1883		Grade II listed (1323621). Architect: George Rackstraw Crickmay.
Swindon	Swindon Civic Offices	More images	Wiltshire	1838		Grade II listed (1467731). Architects: Bertram, Bertram and Rice.
Swindon	Swindon Town Hall	More images	Wiltshire	1891	24 metres (79 ft)	Grade II listed (1355877). Architect: Brightwen Binyon of Ipswich.
Swindon	Old Town Hall, Swindon	More images	Wiltshire	1854		Grade II listed (1023523). Architect: Sampson Sage and E Robertson.
Tadcaster	Old Town Hall, Tadcaster	More images	North Yorkshire	1860		Grade II listed (1316684)
Tamworth	Tamworth Town Hall	More images	Staffordshire	1701		Grade II* listed (1293012). Architect: William Gilkes.
Taunton	Municipal Buildings, Taunton	More images	Somerset	1480		Grade II* listed (1060041).
Tavistock	Tavistock Town Hall	More images	Devon	1864		Grade II listed (1105832). Architect: Edward Rundle.
Tenterden	Tenterden Town Hall	More images	Kent	1792		Grade II listed (1070343).
Tetbury	Tetbury Town Hall	More images	Gloucestershire	1655		Grade I listed (1303914).
Tewkesbury	Tewkesbury Town Hall	More images	Gloucestershire	1788		Grade II* listed (1206399).
Thame	Thame Town Hall	More images	Oxfordshire	1887		Grade II listed (1368763). Architect: Henry James Tollit.
Thetford	Thetford Guildhall	More images	Norfolk	1901		Grade II listed (1207867). Architect: Herbert John Green.
Sowerby	Thirsk and Sowerby Town Hall	More images	North Yorkshire	1913		Architect: Walter Brierley.
Thornaby-on-Tees	Thornaby Town Hall	More images	North Yorkshire	1892		Grade II listed (1320257). Architect: James Garry.
Thornbury	Thornbury Town Hall	More images	Gloucestershire	1785		Grade II listed (1128795).
Tiverton	Tiverton Town Hall	More images	Devon	1864		Grade II listed (1384734). Architect: Henry Lloyd.
Todmorden	Todmorden Town Hall	More images	West Yorkshire	1875	20 metres (66 ft)	Grade I listed (1228980). Architect: John Gibson.
Torquay	Torquay Town Hall	More images	Devon	1911		Grade II listed (1208247). Architect: Thomas Davison.
Torquay	Old Town Hall, Torquay	More images	Devon	1852		Grade II listed (1291593). Architect: Mr Dixon.
Totnes	Totnes Guildhall	More images	Devon	1553		Grade I listed (1235949).
Tottenham	Tottenham Town Hall	More images	Greater London	1905		Grade II listed (1249634). Architects: Arnold Taylor and R Jemmett.
Tottington	Tottington Town Hall	More images	Greater Manchester	1820		Grade II listed (1163648).
Towcester	Towcester Town Hall	More images	Northamptonshire	1866		Grade II listed (1371643). Architect: Thomas Heygate Vernon.
Whitechapel	Tower Hamlets Town Hall	More images	Greater London	1757		Grade II listed (1065788). Architect: Boulton Mainwaring.
Toxteth	Toxteth Town Hall	More images	Merseyside	1866		Grade II listed (1075218). Architect: Thomas Layland.
Trafford	Trafford Town Hall	More images	Greater Manchester	1933		Grade II listed (1391923). Known as Stretford Town Hall until 1974. Architect: Bradshaw, Gass and Hope.
Tring	Tring Market House	More images	Hertfordshire	1898		Grade II listed (1083558). Architect: William Huckvale.
Trowbridge	Trowbridge Town Hall	More images	Wiltshire	1889		Grade II listed (1364209). Architect: Alfred Samuel Goodridge.
Truro	Truro City Hall	More images	Cornwall	1846		Grade II* listed (1201442). Architect: Christopher Eales.
Royal Tunbridge Wells	Tunbridge Wells Town Hall	More images	Kent	1941		Grade II listed (1265550). Architects: Sir Percy Thomas and Ernest Prestwich.
Tunstall	Tunstall Town Hall	More images	Staffordshire	1885		Grade II listed (1290967). Architect: Absalom Wood.
Twickenham	York House	More images	Greater London	1630		Grade II listed (1001548).
Tyldesley	Tyldesley Town Hall	More images	Greater Manchester	1881		
North Shields	Tynemouth Town Hall	More images	Tyne and Wear	1845		Grade II listed (1354989). Architect: John Dobson.
Ulverston	Ulverston Town Hall	More images	Cumbria	1825		
Uppermill	Uppermill Civic Hall	More images	Greater Manchester	1859		Architect: George Shaw.
Upton upon Severn	Upton upon Severn Memorial Hall	More images	Worcestershire	1832		Grade II listed (1227111).
Uttoxeter	Uttoxeter Town Hall	More images	Staffordshire	1854		Grade II listed (1253438). Architect: Thomas Fradgley.
Uxbridge	Uxbridge Town Hall	More images	Greater London	1788		Grade II* listed (1080208).
Ventnor	Ventnor Town Hall	More images	Isle of Wight	1878		Grade II listed (1224297). Architect: Theodore Ridley Saunders.
Wadebridge	Wadebridge Town Hall	More images	Cornwall	1888		Architect: C. E. Collins.
Wakefield	Wakefield Town Hall	More images	West Yorkshire	1880	59 metres (194 ft)	Grade I listed (1258995). Architect: Thomas Edward Collcutt.
Wakefield	Old Town Hall, Wakefield	More images	West Yorkshire	1800		Grade II listed (1259842).
Wallasey	Wallasey Town Hall	More images	Merseyside	1920	55 metres (180 ft)	Grade II listed (1258467). Architects: Briggs, Wolstenholme & Thornely.
Wallingford	Wallingford Town Hall	More images	Oxfordshire	1670		Grade I listed (1368477).
Wallington	Wallington Town Hall	More images	Greater London	1934		Grade II listed (1392569). Architect: Robert Atkinson.
Wallsend	Wallsend Town Hall	More images	Tyne and Wear	1908		Grade II listed (1025330). Architect: E. F. W. Liddle and P. L. Brown.
Walsall	Walsall Town Hall	More images	West Midlands	1903		Grade II listed (1076367). Architect: J S Gibson.
Walsall	Walsall Council House	More images	West Midlands	1905		Grade II listed (1343029). Architect: J S Gibson.
Waltham Abbey	Waltham Abbey Town Hall	More images	Essex	1904		Locally listed.
Waltham Forest	Waltham Forest Town Hall	More images	Greater London	1942		Grade II listed (1190868). Known as Walthamstow Town Hall until 2014. Architect: Philip Hepworth.
Walthamstow	Old Town Hall, Walthamstow	More images	Greater London	1866		Grade II listed (1191150).
Walworth	Walworth Town Hall	More images	Greater London	1865		Grade II listed (1386028). Architect: Henry Jarvis.
Wandsworth	Wandsworth Town Hall	More images	Greater London	1937		Grade II listed (1244323). Architect: Edward A. Hunt.
Wantage	Old Town Hall, Wantage	More images	Oxfordshire	1878		Architect: William Tasker.
Wareham	Wareham Town Hall	More images	Dorset	1870		Architect: George Rackstraw Crickmay.
Wark on Tyne	Wark Town Hall	More images	Northumberland	1874		Grade II listed (1044953).
Warminster	Warminster Town Hall	More images	Wiltshire	1837		Grade II listed (1364438). Architect: Edward Blore.
Warrington	Warrington Town Hall	More images	Cheshire	1750		Grade I listed (1329725). Architect: James Gibbs.
Warsop	Warsop Town Hall	More images	Nottinghamshire	1933		
Waterloo	Waterloo Town Hall	More images	Merseyside	1862		Grade II listed (1257616). Architect: F. S. Spencer Yates.
Watford	Watford Town Hall	More images	Hertfordshire	1939		Grade II listed (1251002). Architect: Charles Cowles-Voysey.
Wath upon Dearne	Wath upon Dearne Town Hall	More images	South Yorkshire	1770		Grade II listed (1192631).
Watlington	Watlington Town Hall	More images	Oxfordshire	1665		Grade II* listed (1369012).
Watton	Watton Town Hall	More images	Norfolk	1853		Grade II listed (1076779). Architect: Edward Buckton Lamb.
Wavertree	Wavertree Town Hall	More images	Merseyside	1872		Grade II listed (1075219). Architect: John Elliot Reeve.
Wednesbury	Wednesbury Town Hall	More images	West Midlands	1874		Architect: Loxton Brothers.
Wellington	Wellington Town Hall	More images	Somerset	1833		Grade II listed (1059915).
Wells	Wells Town Hall	More images	Somerset	1779		Grade II listed (1383028).
Welwyn Garden City	Welwyn Garden City Council Offices	More images	Hertfordshire	1937		Architect: Cecil Harry Elsom.
Wem	Wem Town Hall	More images	Shropshire	1905		
West Bromwich	West Bromwich Town Hall	More images	West Midlands	1874		Grade II listed (1077117). Architects: Alexander & Henman of Stockton-on-Tees.
Westbury	Old Town Hall, Westbury	More images	Wiltshire	1815		Grade II* listed (1036308).
Westhoughton	Westhoughton Town Hall	More images	Greater Manchester	1904		Architects: Bradshaw and Gass.
Westminster	Westminster City Hall	More images	Greater London	1965	76 metres (249 ft)	Architects: Burnet Tait & Partners.
Westminster	Old City Hall, Westminster	More images	Greater London	1890		Grade II listed (1066286). Architect: Robert Walker.
Weston-super-Mare	Weston-super-Mare Town Hall	More images	Somerset	1859		Grade II listed (1138148). Architects: James Wilson and Hans Price.
Wetherby	Wetherby Town Hall	More images	West Yorkshire	1845		Grade II listed (1135070).
Weymouth	Weymouth Guildhall	More images	Dorset	1837		Grade II listed (1132630). Architect: Talbot Bury.
Weymouth	Weymouth Old Town Hall	More images	Dorset	1774		Grade II listed (1141923).
Whitby	Old Town Hall, Whitby	More images	North Yorkshire	1788		Grade II* listed (1261706). Architect: Jonathan Pickernell.
Whitchurch	Whitchurch Town Hall	More images	Hampshire	1791		Grade II* listed (1092680).
Whitchurch	Whitchurch Civic Centre	More images	Shropshire	1970		
Whitehaven	Whitehaven Town Hall	More images	Cumbria	1710		Grade II listed (1086779). Architect: William Barnes.
Whittlesey	Whittlesey Town Hall	More images	Cambridgeshire	1825		Grade II listed (1228223). Architect: Richard Reynolds Rowe.
Widnes	Widnes Town Hall	More images	Cheshire	1885		Grade II listed (1330355). Architect: F. and G. Holme.
Wigan	Wigan Town Hall	More images	Greater Manchester	1903		Grade II listed (1384483). Architect: Briggs and Wolstenholme.
Willenhall	Willenhall Town Hall	More images	West Midlands	1935		Locally listed.
Wilton	Old Town Hall, Wilton	More images	Wiltshire	1738		Grade II listed (1023717).
Wimbledon	Wimbledon Town Hall	More images	Greater London	1931		Grade II listed (1358018). Architect: Bradshaw Gass & Hope.
Wimborne Minster	Wimborne Minster Town Hall	More images	Dorset	1830		Grade II listed (1323802).
Wincanton	Wincanton Town Hall	More images	Somerset	1878		Grade II listed (1274059). Architect: William John Willcox of Bath.
Winchcombe	Winchcombe Town Hall	More images	Gloucestershire	1853		Grade II listed (1091507). Architect: William Hill Knight.
Winchelsea	Winchelsea Court Hall	More images	East Sussex	1294		Grade I listed (1234513).
Winchester	Winchester Guildhall	More images	Hampshire	1875		Grade II listed (1095464). Architects: Jeffery and Skiller.
Windsor	Windsor Guildhall	More images	Berkshire	1689		Grade I listed (1117752).
Wirksworth	Wirksworth Town Hall	More images	Derbyshire	1873		Architect: A. B. Bradby.
Wisbech	Wisbech Town Hall	More images	Cambridgeshire	1811		Grade II listed (1126633). Architect: Joseph Medworth.
Witham	Witham Town Hall	More images	Essex	1800		Grade II listed (1122592).
Withington	Withington Town Hall	More images	Greater Manchester	1881		Grade II listed (1291512). Architect: Lawrence Booth.
Witney	Witney Town Hall	More images	Oxfordshire	1786		Grade II* listed (1213347). Architect: Sir William Chambers.
Wiveliscombe	Wiveliscombe Town Hall	More images	Somerset	1842		Grade II listed (1307454). Architect: Richard Carver.
Woburn	Woburn Town Hall	More images	Bedfordshire	1830		Grade II listed (1321662). Architect: Edward Blore.
Woking	Woking Civic Offices	More images	Surrey	1983		
Wokingham	Wokingham Town Hall	More images	Berkshire	1860	26 metres (85 ft)	Grade II* listed (1303481). Architects: William Ford Poulton and William Henry Woodman.
Wolsingham	Wolsingham Town Hall	More images	County Durham	1824		
Wolverhampton	Wolverhampton Civic Centre	More images	West Midlands	1978		Architects: Clifford Culpin & Partners.
Wolverhampton	Old Town Hall, Wolverhampton	More images	West Midlands	1871		Grade II listed (1201845). Architect: Ernest Bates.
Wombwell	Old Town Hall, Wombwell	More images	South Yorkshire	1900		Locally listed. Architect: John Robinson.
Woodstock	Woodstock Town Hall	More images	Oxfordshire	1767		Grade II listed (1203847). Architect: Sir William Chambers.
Woolwich	Woolwich Town Hall	More images	Greater London	1906	40 metres (131 ft)	Grade II* listed (1289668). Architect: Brumwell Thomas.
Woolwich	Old Town Hall, Woolwich	More images	Greater London	1842		Grade II* listed (1079064).
Wootton Bassett	Wootton Bassett Town Hall	More images	Wiltshire	1690		Grade II listed (1363658).
Worcester	Worcester Guildhall	More images	Worcestershire	1723		Grade I listed (1389921). Architect: Thomas White.
Worksop	Worksop Town Hall	More images	Nottinghamshire	1851		Grade II listed (1045762). Architect: Isaac Charles Gilbert.
Worthing	Worthing Town Hall	More images	West Sussex	1934		Grade II listed (1250786). Architect: Charles Cowles-Voysey.
Wotton-under-Edge	Wotton-under-Edge Town Hall	More images	Gloucestershire	1700		Grade II listed (1341570).
Wrentham	Old Town Hall, Wrentham	More images	Suffolk	1862		Grade II listed (1352560).
Wymondham	Wymondham Town Hall	More images	Norfolk	1820		Grade II listed (1196687).
Yardley	Yardley Council House	More images	West Midlands	1902		Architect: Arthur Harrison.
Yarm	Yarm Town Hall	More images	North Yorkshire	1710		Grade II listed (1329488).
Yarmouth	Yarmouth Town Hall	More images	Isle of Wight	1763		Grade II listed (1292635).
Yeadon	Yeadon Town Hall	More images	West Yorkshire	1880		Grade II listed (1204098). Architect: William Hill of Leeds.
Yeovil	Yeovil Town House	More images	Somerset	1849		Grade II listed (1173857). Architect: Thomas Stent.
York	York Guildhall	More images	North Yorkshire	1459		Grade I listed (1257929).

== See also ==
- List of city and town halls
