= Old Town Hall =

Old Town Hall may refer to:

== Belgium ==
- Old Town Hall, Lo

== Czech Republic ==
- Old Town Hall (Prague)

== Denmark ==
- Old Town Hall (Næstved), former town hall in Næstved
- Old Town Hall (Silkeborg), former town hall in Silkeborg
- Old Town Hall (Store Heddinge), former town hall in Stege
- Old Town Hall (Vordingborg), former town hall in Vordingborg

== Germany ==
- Old Town Hall, Halle (Saale)
- Old Town Hall (Hanover)
- Old Town Hall (Leipzig)
- Old Town Hall, Munich
- Old Town Hall (Oldenburg)

== Mexico ==
- Old Town Hall (Mexico City), among the Federal District buildings

== Poland ==
- Old Town Hall, Gdańsk
- Old Town Hall (Szczecin)
- Old Town Hall, Szombierki
- Old Town Hall (Toruń), in the Medieval Town of Toruń

== Slovakia ==
- Old Town Hall (Bratislava)
- Old Town Hall (Levoča)

== United Kingdom ==
=== England ===
- Old Town Hall, Altrincham, Greater Manchester
- Old Town Hall, Bakewell, Derbyshire
- Old Town Hall, Barking, London
- Old Town Hall, Bawtry, South Yorkshire
- Old Town Hall, Bedford, Bedfordshire
- Old Town Hall, Biggleswade, Bedfordshire
- Old Town Hall, Billericay, Essex
- Old Town Hall, Bosham, West Sussex
- Old Town Hall, Brading, Isle of Wight
- Old Town Hall, Broughton-in-Furness, Cumbria
- Old Town Hall, Bulwell, Nottinghamshire
- Old Town Hall, Burslem, Staffordshire
- Old Town Hall, Carlisle, Cumbria
- Old Town Hall, Chertsey, Surrey
- Old Town Hall, Clitheroe, Lancashire
- Old Town Hall, Crediton, Devon
- Old Town Hall, Cromer, Norfolk
- Old Town Hall and Market Hall, Darlington, County Durham
- Old Town Hall, Devizes, Wiltshire
- Old Town Hall, Droitwich Spa, Worcestershire
- Old Town Hall, Dunwich, Suffolk
- Old Town Hall, Ealing, London
- Old Town Hall, Ellesmere, Shropshire
- Old Town Hall, Epping, Essex
- Old Town Hall, Falmouth, Cornwall
- Old Town Hall, Faringdon, Oxfordshire
- Old Town Hall, Gateshead, Tyne and Wear
- Old Town Hall, Great Dunmow, Essex
- Old Town Hall, Hackney, London
- Old Town Hall, Haltwhistle, Northumberland
- Old Town Hall, Handsworth, West Midlands
- Old Town Hall, Hemel Hempstead, Hertfordshire
- Old Town Hall, Ilfracombe, Devon
- Old Town Hall, Kennington Road, London
- Old Town Hall, Kensington, London
- Old Town Hall, Knaresborough, North Yorkshire
- Lancaster Old Town Hall, Lancashire
- Old Town Hall, Leighton Buzzard, Bedfordshire
- Old Town Hall, Loddon, Norfolk
- Old Town Hall, Mansfield, Nottinghamshire
- Old Town Hall, Middlesbrough, North Yorkshire
- Old Town Hall, Midhurst, West Sussex
- Old Town Hall, Millom, Cumbria
- Old Town Hall, Needham Market, Suffolk
- Old Town Hall, Newport, Shropshire
- Old Town Hall, Newton Abbot, Devon
- Newtown Old Town Hall, Isle of Wight
- Old Town Hall, Oldham, Greater Manchester
- Old Town Hall, Ormskirk, Lancashire
- Old Town Hall, Ottery St Mary, Devon
- Old Town Hall, Oundle, Northamptonshire
- Old Town Hall, Paignton, Devon
- Old Town Hall, Pontefract, West Yorkshire
- Old Town Hall, Poplar, London
- Old Town Hall, Poulton-le-Fylde, Lancashire
- Old Town Hall, Redruth, Cornwall
- Old Town Hall, Reigate, Surrey
- Old Town Hall, Richmond, London
- Old Town Hall, Rickmansworth, Hertfordshire
- Old Town Hall, Seaford, East Sussex
- Sheffield Old Town Hall, South Yorkshire
- Old Town Hall, Somerton, Somerset
- Old Town Hall, Southwick, West Sussex
- Old Town Hall, Spilsby, Lincolnshire
- Old Town Hall, Steyning, West Sussex
- Old Town Hall, St Just, Cornwall
- Old Town Hall, Stroud, Gloucestershire
- Old Town Hall, Swindon, Wiltshire
- Old Town Hall, Tadcaster, North Yorkshire
- Old Town Hall, Torquay, Devon
- Old Town Hall, Wakefield, West Yorkshire
- Old Town Hall, Walthamstow, London
- Old Town Hall, Wantage, Oxfordshire
- Old Town Hall, Westbury, Wiltshire
- Weymouth Old Town Hall, Dorset
- Old Town Hall, Whitby, North Yorkshire
- Old Town Hall, Wigan, Greater Manchester
- Old Town Hall, Wilton, Wiltshire
- Old Town Hall, Wolverhampton, West Midlands
- Old Town Hall, Wombwell, South Yorkshire
- Old Town Hall, Woolwich, London
- Old Town Hall, Wrentham, Suffolk

=== Northern Ireland ===
- Old Town Hall, Banbridge, County Down
- Old Town Hall, Belfast
- Old Town Hall, Lisburn, County Antrim

=== Scotland ===
- Old Town Hall, Ardrossan, North Ayrshire
- Old Town Hall, Leith, Edinburgh
- Old Town Hall, Newton Stewart, Dumfries and Galloway
- Old Town Hall, Portsoy, Aberdeenshire
- Old Town Hall, Stranraer, Dumfries and Galloway

=== Wales ===
- Old Town Hall, Aberdare, Rhondda Cynon Taf
- Old Town Hall, Llandrindod Wells, Powys
- Old Town Hall, Usk, Monmouthshire

== United States ==
Listed on the National Register of Historic Places:

- Vacaville Town Hall (Vacaville, California)
- Old Town Hall (Chester, Connecticut)
- Old Town Hall (Stamford, Connecticut)
- Old Town Hall (Wilmington, Delaware)
- Old Town Hall (Athol, Massachusetts)
- Old Town Hall (Pittsfield, Massachusetts)
- Old Town Hall (Tyngsborough, Massachusetts)
- Old Town Hall (Fairfax, Virginia)

Other buildings:

- Old Town Hall (Salem, New Hampshire), listed on the New Hampshire State Register of Historic Places

== See also ==
- Old Town Hall Historic District (disambiguation)
- Old City Hall (disambiguation)
- Town Hall (disambiguation)
