= Neston Town Hall =

Municipal building in Cheshire, England

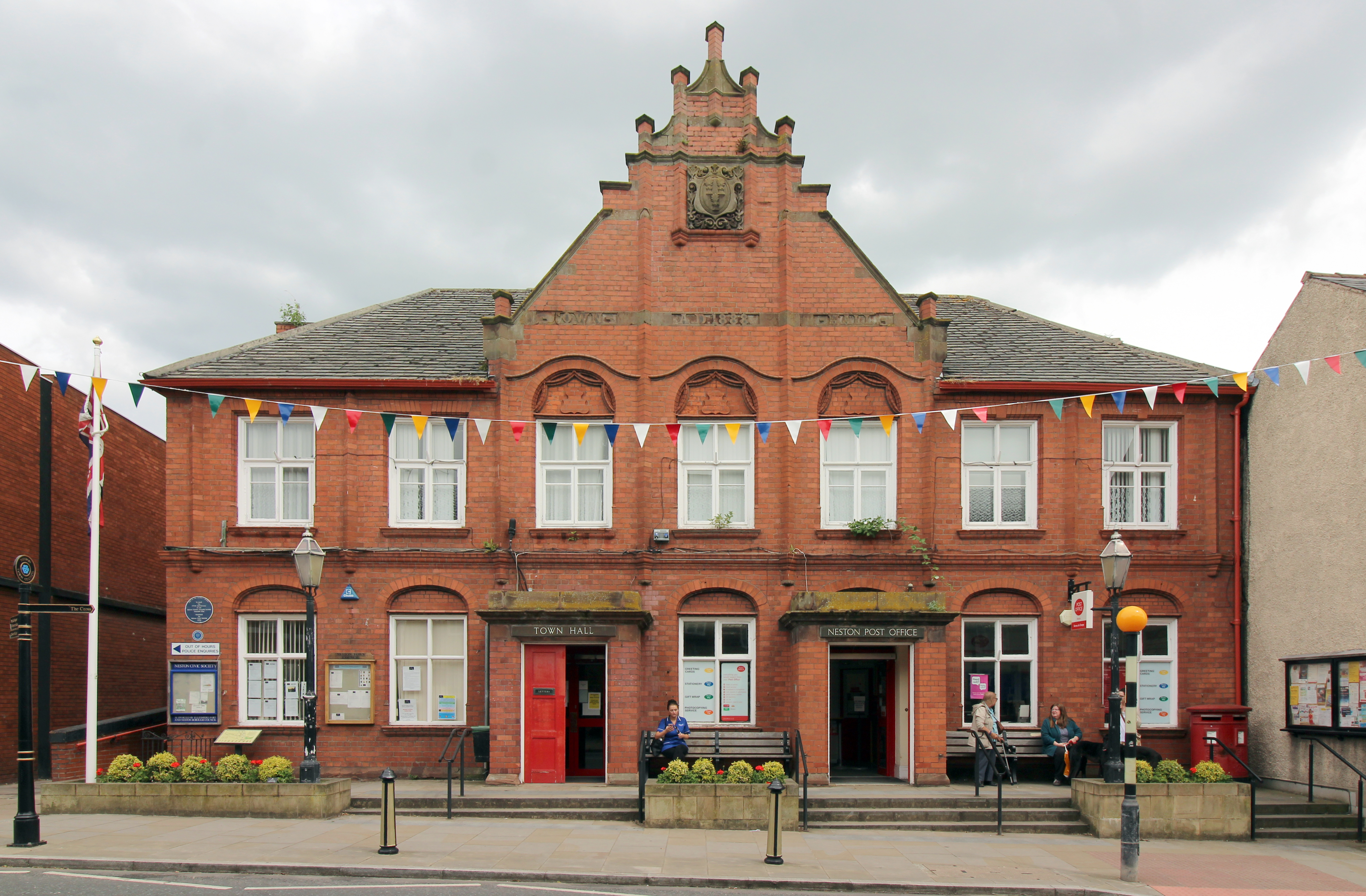
- Neston Town Hall

- Shown in Cheshire
- 53.2905°N 3.0644°W
- Location: High Street, Neston

History
- Built: 1889

Site notes
- Architect: David Walker
- Architectural style: Queen Anne style

Neston Town Hall is a municipal building on High Street, Neston, Cheshire, England. The structure accommodates the offices and the meeting place of Neston Town Council.

== History ==
Initially, the Neston and Parkgate Local Board, which was formed in 1867, met in a room at the elementary school known as the "National School" in Liverpool Road. After finding this arrangement inadequate, the members of the board, the local magistrates and other prominent people in the town decided to form a private company to raise money for the purpose of procuring a purpose-built town hall. It was intended that the town hall would commemorate the Golden Jubilee of Queen Victoria: the site they selected was occupied by another educational establishment known as the "National Society School" or the "Charity School".

The foundation stone for the new building was laid by the wife of a member of the local board, John Gaitskell Churton, on 6 September 1888. It was designed by David Walker of Liverpool in the Queen Anne style, built by William Pritchard of Little Neston in red brick with stone dressings at a cost of £2,000 and was completed in February 1889. The design involved a symmetrical main frontage with seven bays facing onto High Street; the third bay on the left featured a porch giving access to the town hall while the third bay on the right featured a porch giving access to the post office, which is now closed. The other bays on the ground floor and the bays on the first floor were fenestrated with sash windows. Above the three central windows on the first floor were three wheatsheaves, and above that, a gable with a stone panel which also depicted three wheatsheaves: these wheatsheaves were a heraldic device used by Ranulf de Blondeville, 6th Earl of Chester who had founded Dieulacres Abbey at Poulton. Internally the principal room was the council chamber on the first floor. A drill hall was established in the basement for the use of the 1st Volunteer Battalion, the Cheshire Regiment who had previously used a very dilapidated drill hall on the opposite side of High Street.

After significant population growth, largely associated with the status of Neston as a market town, the area became an urban district with the town hall as its headquarters in 1933. The new Neston Urban District Council took ownership of the building from the original private company in 1934, but the building ceased to be local seat of government when the enlarged Ellesmere Port and Neston Borough Council was formed in 1974. In 1984, the Neston Civic Society attached a plaque to the front of the town hall to celebrate the 170th anniversary of the founding of the Neston Female Friendly Society. The building continued to be used by the new council for the delivery of local services and was extensively refurbished in 2005. However, the local authority ceased using it in 2013, and instead it became home to the offices of Neston Town Council.

On 23 March 2018, a paving stone was laid outside the town hall to commemorate the life of the locally-born soldier, Lieutenant Colonel Christopher Bushell of the Queen's Royal Regiment (West Surrey), who was awarded the Victoria Cross for his actions at Tergnier in France in March 1918 during the First World War. Works of art in the town hall include two landscape paintings by unknown artists.
