= Barking Town Hall =

Municipal building in London, England

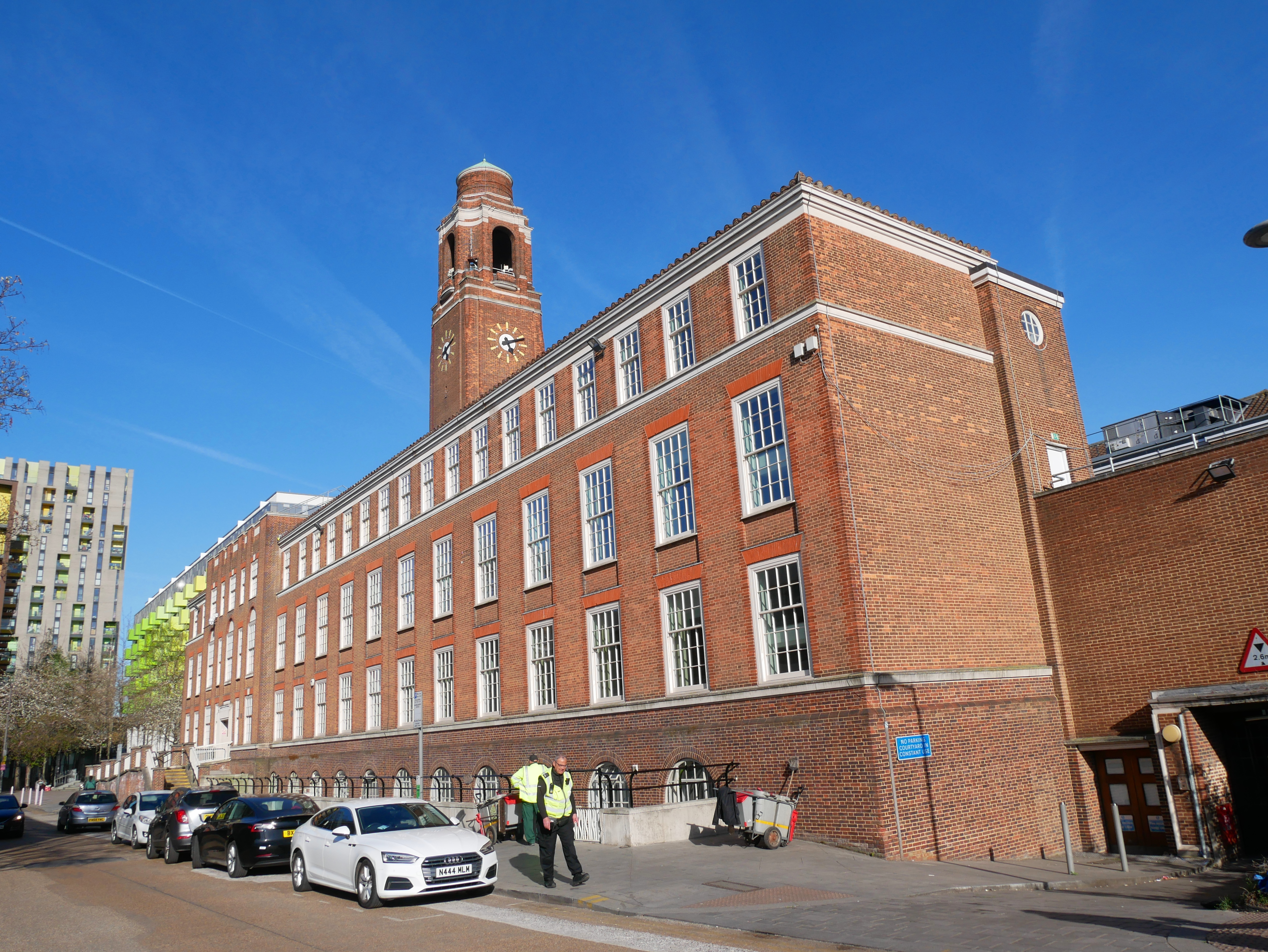
- Northwest view of Barking Town Hall

- Shown in Barking and Dagenham
- 51.5358°N 0.0784°E
- Location: Barking, London, England

History
- Built: 1958

Site notes
- Architect(s): Herbert Jackson and Reginald Edmonds
- Architectural style: Neo-Georgian style

Barking Town hall is a municipal building in Clockhouse Avenue, Barking, London, England. The town hall, which is the headquarters of Barking and Dagenham London Borough Council, is a locally listed building.

== History ==
The building was commissioned to replace the old town hall in East Street. A large site was chosen for the new building east of Broadway and extensive demolition of aging residential accommodation was undertaken in the late 1930s. The clearance included the buildings on Heath Street which led down to Barking Wharf.

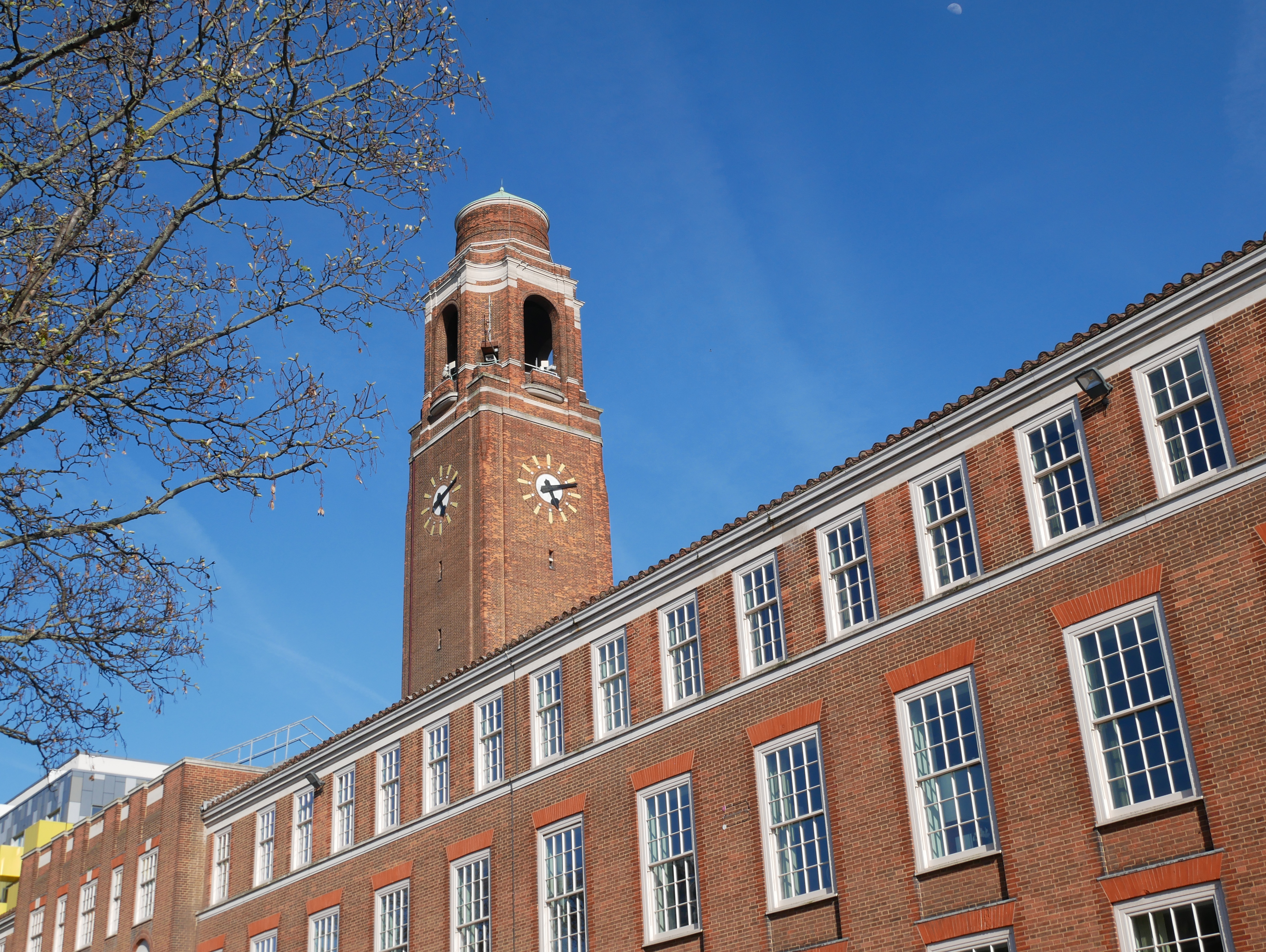
Northwest view of the tower

The new building was designed by Herbert Jackson and Reginald Edmonds in the Neo-Georgian style and was inspired by Stockholm City Hall. The design for the main frontage in Barking Town Square, which was brick faced, involved nine bays with an arched doorway on the ground floor, a balcony and three tall windows on the first floor and three smaller windows on the second floor; a tall clock tower surmounted by a cupola was erected at roof level. The size of the building was maximised by the use of lengthy side elevations: the elevations on the north west and south east sides extended back 17 bays.

Construction work started in 1939 and was delayed the completed basement was put into use as an air raid shelter for the duration of the Second World War. After the war construction was resumed and was undertaken by the council's own direct workforce at a cost of £520,000. The building was officially opened by Dame Evelyn Sharp, Permanent Secretary of the Ministry of Housing and Local Government, on 17 December 1958.

Barking Assembly Hall, which adjoins the main building, was added in 1961. Now known as "The Broadway", it was remodeled as an arts centre and auditorium in 2006.

The town hall was established as the headquarters of the Municipal Borough of Barking and continued to function as the local of seat of government when the enlarged London Borough of Barking and Dagenham was formed in 1965. Queen Elizabeth II, accompanied by the Duke of Edinburgh, visited the town hall complex as part of the borough's 50th anniversary celebrations in July 2015.

A major refurbishment of the complex, to a design by Hawkins\Brown, was completed in 2006 with further alterations to facilitate open plan working being completed in April 2018.
