= Newmarket Town Hall =

Municipal building in Newmarket, Suffolk, England

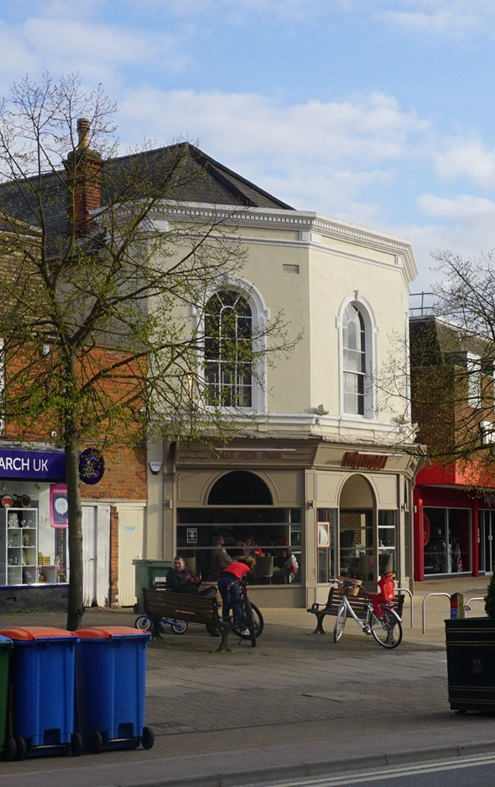
- The building in 2015

- Shown in Suffolk
- 52.2448°N 0.4083°E
- Location: High Street, Newmarket

History
- Built: 1830

Site notes
- Architectural style: Neoclassical style

Listed Building – Grade II
- Official name: 29 High Street
- Designated: 25 June 1984
- Reference no.: 1351290

Newmarket Town Hall is a former municipal building in Newmarket, Suffolk, a town in England. The structure, which currently serves as an Italian restaurant, is a Grade II listed building.

== History ==
The building was commissioned by the actor and theatre manager, David Fisher, as part of a project to establish a chain of theatres across East Anglia. The site he selected had previously been used as a cock pit and Fisher acquired the site from the land-owner, John Manners, 5th Duke of Rutland, in 1825. The new building was designed in the neoclassical style, built in brick with a stucco finish and was completed about 1830.

The building was converted for municipal use as the local town hall in 1849. Internally, the principal room created was a public hall, on the first floor, which was used for a variety of events. Following significant population growth, largely associated with the horse racing and stabling industries, a local board of health was established in the town in 1851. After the local board of health was succeeded by Newmarket Urban District Council, the new council held its first meeting in the town hall on 31 December 1894.

In September 1907, the building was being used as a cinema, when the projector was knocked over, causing a fire. In the resulting panic, there were about 300 injuries, some serious, and one woman was crushed to death in the ensuing panic. One of those who was involved was the jockey, Henri Jelliss, who was a 15-year-old boy at the time.

The council was based at the town hall until July 1922, when it moved to Godolphin House at 2 The Avenue: it then disposed of the town hall for commercial use. The building was subsequently converted into the offices of the "Newmarket Gas Company", which maintained a gas appliance showroom on the ground floor. This was replaced by the "Jane of Newmarket" women's fashion shop in 1978, and then by the "Anne Furbank" women's fashion shop in 2008. In 2012, the building became a branch of the "Wildwood" chain of Italian restaurants.

== Architecture ==
The two-storey building is at 29 High Street. It has a canted facade, with one round-headed first-floor window with an architrave and a keystone on each of the three faces. The ground floor has a mid-20th century shopfront. The former public hall, which has a moulded ceiling, is on the first floor. The building has been grade II listed since 1984.
