= Old Council House, Solihull =

Municipal building in Solihull, West Midlands, England

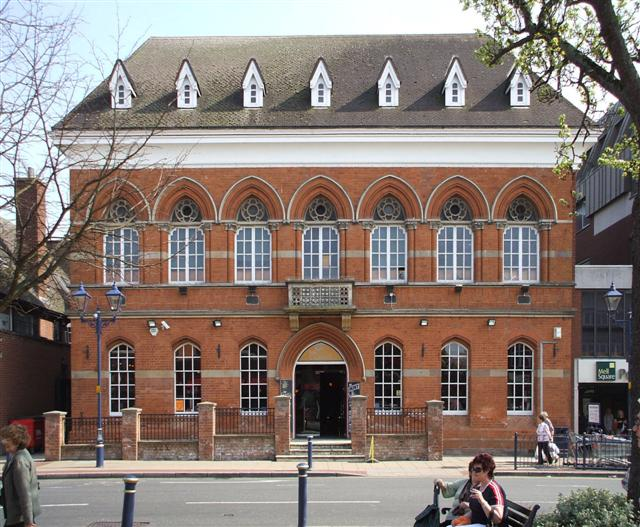
- Old Council House, Solihull

- Shown in West Midlands
- 52.4146°N 1.7784°W
- Location: Poplar Road, Solihull

History
- Built: 1876

Site notes
- Architect: J. A. Chatwin
- Architectural style: Italianate style

The Old Council House is a former municipal building in Poplar Road, Solihull, West Midlands, England. The town hall, which was the meeting place of Solihull Borough Council, is now a public house.

== History ==
The first town hall in Solihull was on The Square on a site which had previously been part of St Alphege's Churchyard and was completed in 1848. (Note: The aging first town hall was demolished in 1879.) In the early 1870s a small group of local businessmen formed a private company to erect and operate a more substantial public hall: the site they selected was on the east side of what was then a connecting road between Warwick Road and the High Street.

The new building was designed by the Birmingham architect, J. A. Chatwin, in the Italianate style, built in red brick with stone dressings by a local builder, a Mr Deebank, and completed in 1876. The design involved a symmetrical main frontage with seven bays facing onto Poplar Road; the central bay featured an arched doorway on the ground floor with a stone balcony above; there were seven gothic windows which were decorated with bar tracery with cusped circles (with bars radiating from the centre), (Note: The style of tracery is derived from that employed at Reims Cathedral.) flanked by Corinthian order colonettes, forming an arcade on the first floor and there were seven narrow dormer windows at attic level. Internally, the principal rooms were a courthouse on the ground floor and an assembly room on the first floor.

After an increase in the population, largely associated with the town's increasing importance as a residential area for the people working in Birmingham, the area became an urban district in 1932. There was a significant increase in the amount of casework in the courts in the 1930s, which led to the magistrates moving to a dedicated courthouse facility at Warwick Road in 1935. This in turn allowed the new urban district council to convert the old courtroom into a council chamber and to adopt the building in Poplar Road as its council house. After announcing the town's advancement to the status of a municipal borough, Princess Margaret waved to the crowds from the balcony of the council house and then signed the visitors' book on 11 March 1954.

The building continued to serve as the council house for the borough until a purpose-built modern civic centre was completed in Manor Square in 1967. The old council house was subsequently used as a public venue for concerts and other performances until it was converted by Wetherspoons into a public house known as the "Assembly Rooms" in 2008. After being sold to the Stonegate Pub Company in 2016, it was rebranded as Yates Solihull.
