= Old Town Hall, Great Dunmow =

Municipal building in Great Dunmow, Essex, England

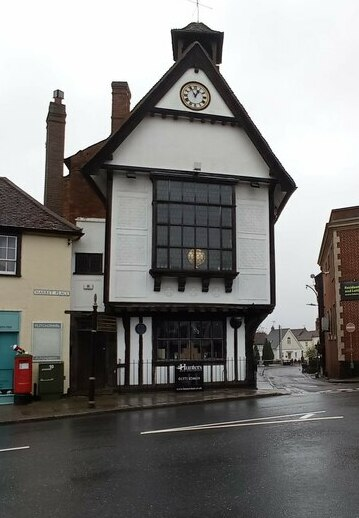
- Old Town Hall, Great Dunmow

- Shown in Essex
- 51.8729°N 0.3623°E
- Location: Market Place, Great Dunmow

History
- Built: 1578

Site notes
- Architectural style: Elizabethan style

Listed Building – Grade II
- Official name: Old Town Hall
- Designated: 16 February 1984
- Reference no.: 1142444

The Old Town Hall is a municipal building in the Market Place, Great Dunmow, Essex, England. The structure, which is now in retail use, is a Grade II listed building.

== History ==
The town hall was commissioned as a guildhall following the incorporation of the borough in 1555. It was designed in the Elizabethan style, built using timber-framing with plaster infill, and was completed in around 1578. Internally, the principal room was the assembly room on the first floor.

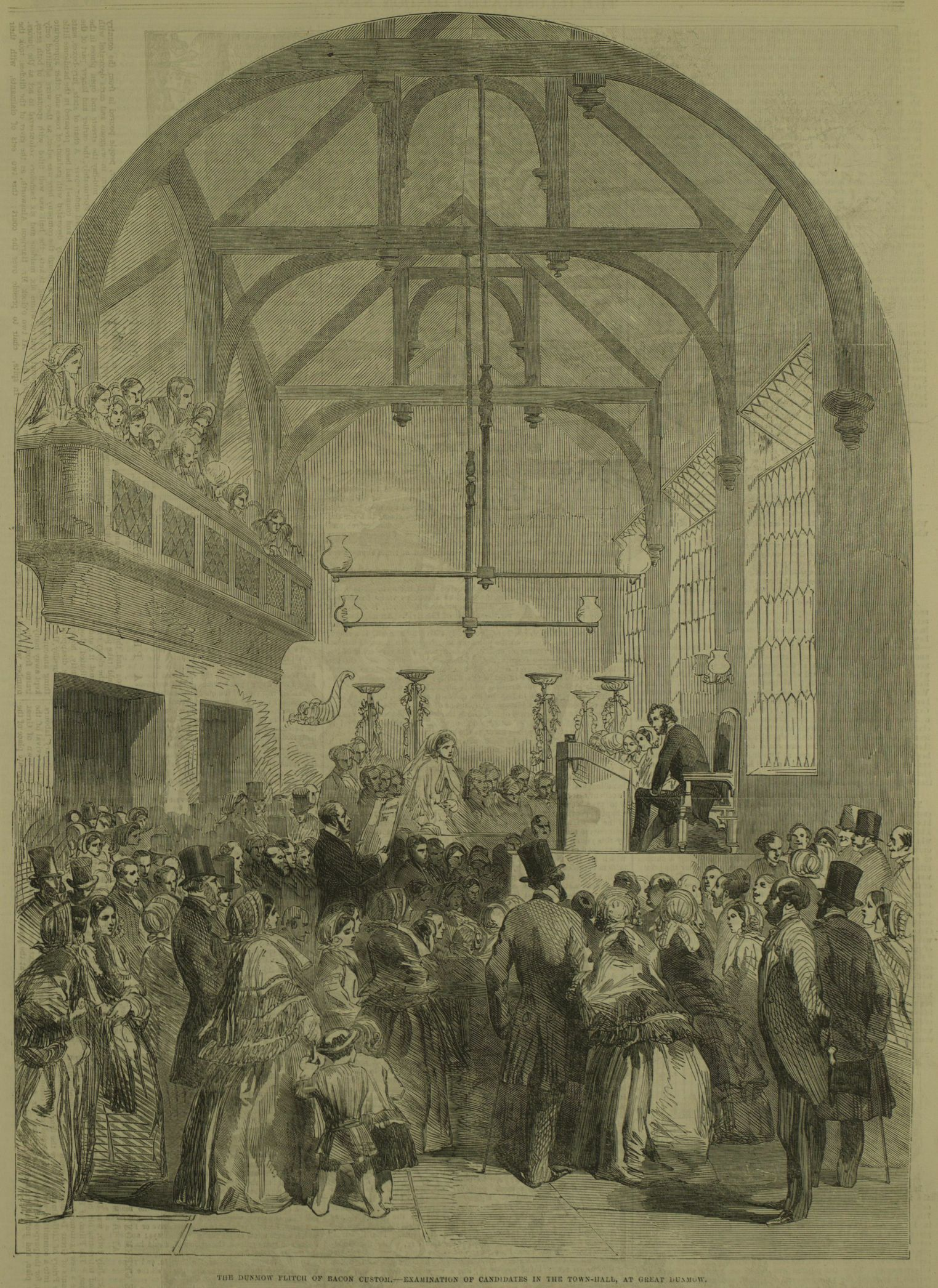
The Dunmow Flitch of Bacon Custom: Examination of the Candidates in the Town-Hall at Great Dunmow (1855).

The first floor was re-built in 1854-55, more than doubling the height of the assembly room (to which a gallery, 'capable of accommodating nearly 100 persons', was added on the north side). The design involved an asymmetrical main frontage of two bays facing onto the Market Place. The left hand bay, which was narrow and recessed, contained a doorway with a rectangular fanlight on the ground floor, and a small bi-partite window on the first floor. The right hand bay was fenestrated by a timber framed window on the ground floor, and by a prominent oriel window on the first floor, which was jettied out over the pavement and extensively decorated by pargeting. The right hand bay was surmounted by a gable containing a bargeboard and a clock face. At roof level, there was a cupola, containing a bell, which was surmounted by a pyramid-shaped roof and a weather vane. The cost of the clock, which was added during the rebuilding, was met from surplus money raised from awarding the Dunmow flitch, a custom which was revived in 1855.

The assembly room became the venue for public meetings in the town and also served as the regular meeting place of the local masonic lodge. However, the borough council, which had also met in the town hall, was abolished under the Municipal Corporations Act 1883. The building was then acquired by a syndicate of investors for commercial use in 1888. Meanwhile, Foakes Hall, which was financed by a legacy from Alice Foakes, was erected in Stortford Road and was officially opened in September 1934; it subsequently became the regular meeting place of Great Dunmow Parish Council. By the second half of the 20th century, the old town hall was serving as the offices of a firm of estate agents.
