= Old Town Hall, Newton Abbot =

Municipal building in Newton Abbot, Devon, England

Old Town Hall
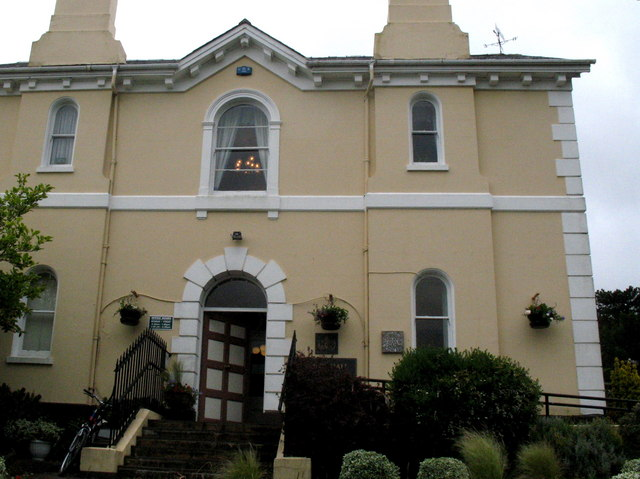
- The St Paul's Road frontage in 2009

- Shown in Devon
- 50.5299°N 3.6035°W
- Location: Devon Square, Newton Abbot

History
- Built: 1862

Site notes
- Architect: William John Rowell
- Architectural style: Italianate style

Listed Building – Grade II
- Official name: 9–13 Devon Square (No 9 former Town Hall)
- Designated: 26 March 1975
- Reference no.: 1257148

The Old Town Hall, also known as No. 9 Devon Square, is a former municipal building in Devon Square in Newton Abbot, a town in Devon, in England. The structure, which started life as a private house and was later converted for municipal use, is a Grade II listed building.

== History ==
The building was commissioned by the local landowner, William Courtenay, 11th Earl of Devon, as part of a terrace of five properties on Devon Square. The site he chose was occupied by a lock-up which was used to accommodate escaped prisoners from HM Prison Dartmoor and was supervised by the Superintendent Constable of the Lock-up House, William Thomas Baker.

The terrace was designed by the earl's architect, William John Rowell, in the Italianate style, built in brick with a stucco finish and was completed in 1862. On completion of the building, Rowell moved into No. 9 himself, accompanied by his wife and children. Rowell continued to live there until he died in September 1911. The building was then taken over by the YMCA which remained there until after the Second World War.

In the 1980s, the building was acquired by Newton Abbot Town Council as their offices and meeting place and an extension was added at its rear. (Note: The Newton Abbot Local Board and, from 1894, the Newton Abbot Urban District Council were based at council offices in Courtenay Street, but those offices ceased to be the local seat of government when the enlarged Teignbridge District Council was formed in offices Kingsteignton Road in 1974.) The Newton Abbot Town and Great Western Railway Museum was established in the building in the early 1990s. At a ceremony in the building, the commanding officer of the nuclear submarine, HMS Triumph, Commander Steve Waller, accepted the freedom of the town in September 2019.

In March 2020, the town council relocated to St Leonard's Church in Wolborough Street, which was restored and converted to accommodate the council. The museum followed to St Leonard's Church in October 2020. The building in Devon Square, which was renamed Great Western House, was subsequently occupied by a firm of funeral directors, Parker's Family Funeral Directors.

== Architecture ==
The two-storey building, No. 9 Devon Square, is at one end of the terrace, and was originally a mirror image of No. 13 Devon Square, at the other end of the terrace. Like No. 13, it is projected forward from the centre of the terrace, and its front is three bays wide and features an oculus in the centre of the gable. The ground floor is fenestrated by rusticated sash windows which are pedimented, except for the central bay which is surmounted by a cornice. The first floor is fenestrated round headed windows; the window in the central bay is surmounted by a curved pediment. Access to No. 9 is up a short flight of steps and through a doorway on the St Paul's Road frontage to the building. The entire terrace was grade II listed in 1975.
