= Old Town Hall, Epping =

Municipal building in Epping, Essex, England

Old Town Hall
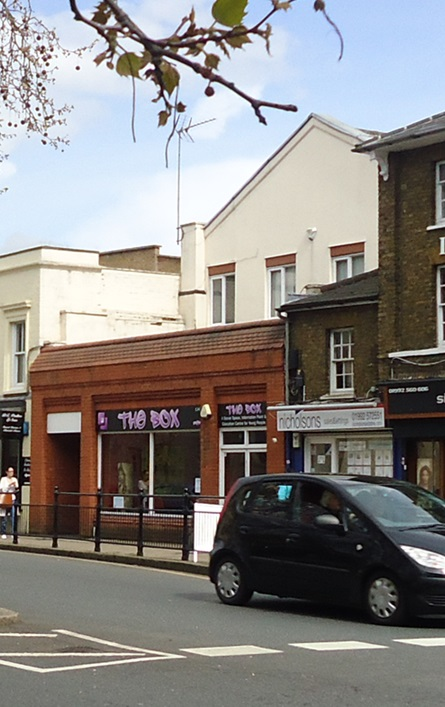
- The building (centre, in use as The Box) in 2012

- Shown in Essex
- 51.6981°N 0.1106°E
- Location: High Street, Epping

History
- Built: 1863

Site notes
- Architectural style: Italianate style (originally)

The Old Town Hall is a former municipal building in the High Street in Epping, Essex, a town in England. The building, which briefly served as the headquarters of Epping Urban District Council, now accommodates a firm of estate agents.

== History ==
In the mid-19th century, a group of local businessmen decided to form a company, to be known as the Epping Town Hall Company, to finance and commission a town hall for the town. The new building was designed in the Italianate style, built in red brick at a cost of about £1,700 and was completed in 1863. The site they selected was on the southeast side of the High Street.

The design involved a single-storey entrance block of three bays, facing onto the High Street, and a full-height main block with a gable stretching back behind the entrance block. The first two bays of the entrance block were fenestrated by segmental headed sash windows, while the right-hand bay featured a round-headed doorway flanked by a pair Doric order pilasters supporting an architrave and a keystone. Internally, the principal room was the main assembly hall, which could seat 500 people and was used for a variety of meetings, concerts, and other public events.

After the Epping Union and Rural Sanitary Authority was succeeded by Epping Urban District Council in 1896, the council decided to use the town hall as its offices and meeting place. However, the company that had developed the town hall got into financial difficulties and the council had to use temporary facilities for its meetings, before relocating to Hawthorn Lodge on the opposite side of the High Street.

In 1912, the building was sold for alternative use and was converted into the Picture House cinema, seating 419 people. A large hoarding was erected on the roof of the entrance block advertising the latest film available for viewing. The company which had developed the town hall was then dissolved in May 1915. By the early 1920s, the cinema was part of the Shipman & King circuit, and in 1924 it was renamed the Picture Palace. In 1935, it suffered a major fire, but was rebuilt and reopened the following year as the Empire Cinema. The cinema closed in 1954, and the facade was rebuilt with a modern shopfront allowing the building to become a Tesco supermarket. The entrance building was occupied by a photography shop, "The Portrait Studio", in the early 21st century, then by an education centre for young people known as "The Box" from around 2010, and then by a firm of estate agents, Mullucks, from about 2015. Offices were installed in the former assembly hall.
