= Old Town Hall, Crediton =

Municipal building in Crediton, Devon, England

Old Town Hall
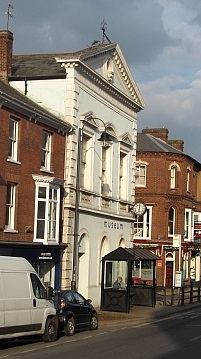
- The building in 2012

- Shown in Devon
- 50.7909°N 3.6604°W
- Location: High Street, Crediton

History
- Built: 1852

Site notes
- Architect: Richard Davie Gould
- Architectural style: Neoclassical style

Listed Building – Grade II
- Official name: Former Literary Society Public Rooms
- Designated: 10 October 1972
- Reference no.: 1208961

The Old Town Hall is a historic building in the High Street in Crediton, a town in Devon in England. The structure, which was previously used as public events venue and currently accommodates the Crediton Museum, is a Grade II listed building.

== History ==
The building was commissioned by the Crediton Literary Society and Mechanic's Institute to serve as their public rooms. The society had around 150 members and was established in 1832. The building was designed by Richard Davie Gould of Barnstaple in the neoclassical style, built in brick with a stucco finish and was completed in 1852.

Near the end of the century, the building was reconstructed, but the original facade was retained. It then served as a public events venue known as the "Town Hall". It became a popular venue for theatrical performances: a comic play known as "A Bogus Bandit" by Leopold Montague was performed there in February 1896, and plays continued to be performed there until the mid-20th century. The building was not used as a town hall in the municipal sense: the local urban district council was based at the council offices in Parliament Street. The Royal British Legion acquired the building in 1951 but the Legion then sold it on for retail use in 1962. The ground floor was altered and it was subsequently occupied by a furniture and bedding shop, known as "Townsends". The building was grade II listed in 1972.

In the early 21st century, the building acquired by the Crediton Area Development Trust, for use as a community events venue. A major programme of refurbishment works, funded by the National Lottery Heritage Fund, was completed at a cost of £478,500 in 2004. While the first floor was made available for community events, the Crediton Area History and Museum Society, which was founded in 1984, established the Crediton Museum on the ground floor in April 2010. Exhibits include a detailed drawing as well as a model of the High Street immediately before a major fire which took place in 1743.

== Architecture ==
The two-storey building is constructed of brick on a stone plinth, with stone dressings and a slate roof. The front and the ground floor of the right side is stuccoed. The design involves a symmetrical main frontage of three bays. There are three round-headed openings on the ground floor with a doorway in the left-hand opening and windows in the other two openings. The first floor is fenestrated with sash windows with balustrades in front and pediments above. The main frontage is surmounted by a large modillioned pediment containing a roundel with a projecting bracket in the tympanum. Below the pediment is an inscription: "ANNO QUINTO VICTORIAE REGINAE MDCCCLII". Inside, there is an open well staircase, and the first floor room has late Victorian plasterwork.
