= Grade II* listed buildings in Wiltshire (P–Z) =

Wiltshire shown in England

There are over 20,000 Grade II* listed buildings in England. This article comprises a list of these buildings in the county of Wiltshire.

== List ==
Name	Location	Type	Completed (Note: The date given is the date used by Historic England as significant for the initial building or that of an important part in the structure's description.)	Date designated	Grid ref. (Note: The grid reference is based on the British national grid reference system, sometimes known as OSGB36, used by the Ordnance Survey.) Geo-coordinates	Entry number (Note: The "List Entry Number" is a unique number assigned to each listed building and scheduled monument by Historic England.)	Image
Parish Church	Easton Grey, Wiltshire	Anglican Church	1836	28 October 1959	ST8808487642; 51°35′15″N 2°10′24″W	1023199	Parish Church More images
Parish Church of St Denys (the Minster Church)	Warminster, Wiltshire	Parish Church	11th century	28 April 1952	ST8692445494; 51°12′31″N 2°11′19″W	1364460	Parish Church of St Denys (the Minster Church) More images
Parks Court	Upton Scudamore, Wiltshire	Farmhouse	15th century	24 July 1969	ST8655847759; 51°13′44″N 2°11′38″W	1021515	Upload Photo
Parliament Piece	Ramsbury, Wiltshire	House	c. 1620	22 August 1966	SU2734471707; 51°26′37″N 1°36′29″W	1183680	Upload Photo
Parnella House	Devizes, Wiltshire	House	18th century	9 April 1954	SU0033861579; 51°21′12″N 1°59′48″W	1250833	Parnella House More images
Parsonage Farmhouse	Salisbury, Wiltshire	Farmhouse	16th century ORIGIN	12 October 1972	SU1325232260; 51°05′22″N 1°48′44″W	1243246	Upload Photo
Part of King's Arms Hotel	Salisbury, Wiltshire	Public House	1952	28 February 1952	SU1457329657; 51°03′58″N 1°47′36″W	1259028	Part of King's Arms Hotel More images
Peacock Cottages	Winterbourne Dauntsey, Winterbourne, Wiltshire	House	15th century	29 May 1987	SU1759134829; 51°06′45″N 1°45′00″W	1184635	Peacock Cottages More images
Philipps House	Dinton Park, Dinton, Wiltshire	Apartment	1960	23 March 1960	SU0041631910; 51°05′11″N 1°59′44″W	1318756	Philipps House More images
Phipps Mausoleum in Westbury Cemetery	Westbury, Wiltshire	Mausoleum	1871-1886 (on the OS map)	31 March 1978	ST8811351448; 51°15′43″N 2°10′18″W	1364424	Phipps Mausoleum in Westbury Cemetery More images
Pickwick Manor	Corsham, Wiltshire	House	14th-century to 15th-century origins	20 December 1960	ST8626170527; 51°26′01″N 2°11′57″W	1363977	Upload Photo
Polebarn House with Brick Boundary Wall, Gatepiers and Gates	Trowbridge, Wiltshire	House/Hotel	1789	29 December 1950	ST8589458055; 51°19′17″N 2°12′14″W	1021632	Polebarn House with Brick Boundary Wall, Gatepiers and Gates More images
Pond Farmhouse	Purton Stoke, Purton, Wiltshire	Farmhouse	17th century	17 January 1985	SU0877690033; 51°36′33″N 1°52′29″W	1356025	Upload Photo
Pound Farmhouse	Purton, Wiltshire	Farmhouse	Mid 15th century	17 January 1955	SU0934588976; 51°35′58″N 1°51′59″W	1023175	Upload Photo
Pound Street Malthouse	Warminster, Wiltshire	Malt House	18th century	28 April 1952	ST8665944907; 51°12′12″N 2°11′32″W	1036240	Upload Photo
Premises on East Corner of New Street	Devizes, Wiltshire	Snuff factory	Modern	9 April 1954	SU0043661647; 51°21′14″N 1°59′42″W	1251673	Premises on East Corner of New Street More images
Priestley's House	The Green, Calne, Wiltshire	House	16th century	19 May 1950	ST9996470725; 51°26′08″N 2°00′07″W	1270902	Upload Photo
Priory Manor	The Priory, Kington St Michael, Wiltshire	House	15th century	20 December 1960	ST8951277796; 51°29′56″N 2°09′09″W	1022340	Upload Photo
Pythouse	Pythouse Park, West Tisbury, Wiltshire	Apartment	1987	6 January 1966	ST9063528564; 51°03′23″N 2°08′06″W	1318819	Pythouse More images
RAF Club	Calne, Wiltshire	Cross Passage House	Early 17th century	19 May 1950	ST9985970826; 51°26′11″N 2°00′12″W	1247102	Upload Photo
Railway Viaduct	Chippenham, Wiltshire	Railway Viaduct	1841	22 June 1978	ST9181573588; 51°27′40″N 2°07′09″W	1267956	Railway Viaduct More images
Rectory Farmhouse	Britford, Wiltshire	Detached House	Mid 17th century	23 March 1960	SU1627128499; 51°03′20″N 1°46′09″W	1023790	Rectory Farmhouse
Remains of Old Fonthill Abbey	Fonthill Abbey Wood, Fonthill Gifford, Wiltshire	Country House	1796-c1818	6 January 1966	ST9182230997; 51°04′42″N 2°07′05″W	1146090	Remains of Old Fonthill Abbey More images
Restrop House	Purton, Wiltshire	House	Late C16-Early 17th century	17 April 1986	SU0811486884; 51°34′51″N 1°53′03″W	1356028	Upload Photo
Retaining Wall, Rails, Gates and Stable Yard Wall of No 17, Market Place	Devizes, Wiltshire	Gate		19 September 1972	SU0030361562; 51°21′11″N 1°59′49″W	1263273	Upload Photo
Riverside House	Axford, Wiltshire	House	17th century	22 August 1966	SU2388370076; 51°25′45″N 1°39′28″W	1365448	Upload Photo
Roche Court	Winterslow, Wiltshire	House	1804-5	29 May 1987	SU2501134064; 51°06′19″N 1°38′39″W	1300004	Roche Court More images
Roche Old Court	Winterslow, Wiltshire	House	c1600-1625	23 March 1960	SU2465934115; 51°06′21″N 1°38′57″W	1300012	Roche Old Court More images
Rockley Manor	Rockley, Ogbourne St. Andrew, Wiltshire	House	18th century	27 February 1958	SU1624871897; 51°26′45″N 1°46′03″W	1033851	Upload Photo
Rose and Crown Public House and attached Stable Block	Chippenham, Wiltshire	Hall House	C14/C15	25 April 1950	ST9221073141; 51°27′26″N 2°06′49″W	1268032	Rose and Crown Public House and attached Stable Block More images
Rosefield and Homefield with Gatepiers, Gate Standards and Gate	Trowbridge, Wiltshire	House	late C18/early 19th century	29 December 1950	ST8600757909; 51°19′12″N 2°12′08″W	1021633	Upload Photo
Rowden Farmhouse with Barn, Outbuildings and Gatepiers attached	Chippenham, Lacock, Wiltshire	Farmhouse	Possibly earlier core-Pre 16th century	16 June 1986	ST9182572091; 51°26′52″N 2°07′08″W	1022194	Upload Photo
Rudloe Manor	Rudloe, Box, Wiltshire	Manor House	Late Medieval	24 July 1985	ST8422870667; 51°26′05″N 2°13′42″W	1022808	Rudloe Manor More images
Former Salisbury and South Wiltshire Museum, 40 and 42 St Anns St	Salisbury, Wiltshire	House	18th century	28 February 1952	SU1474329612; 51°03′56″N 1°47′28″W	1258828	Former Salisbury and South Wiltshire Museum, 40 and 42 St Anns St More images
Sandcliffe	Devizes, Wiltshire	House	Early 18th century	9 April 1954	SU0015961632; 51°21′14″N 1°59′57″W	1251683	Sandcliffe More images
Screen to Road in front of Portway House	Warminster, Wiltshire	Gate	1760	26 May 1954	ST8737745360; 51°12′26″N 2°10′55″W	1285678	Screen to Road in front of Portway House
Seend House	Seend, Wiltshire	House	c1805-1810	19 March 1962	ST9432760917; 51°20′50″N 2°04′58″W	1243855	Upload Photo
Shalbourne Manor Farmhouse	Shalbourne, Wiltshire	Farmhouse	16th century	22 August 1966	SU3143462912; 51°21′52″N 1°33′00″W	1184699	Shalbourne Manor Farmhouse More images
Silver Street House	Bradford-on-Avon, Wiltshire	House	Early 18th century	18 April 1952	ST8273461034; 51°20′53″N 2°14′57″W	1036125	Silver Street House More images
Somerset Hospital	Froxfield, Wiltshire	Almshouses	1694	22 August 1966	SU3000668090; 51°24′40″N 1°34′12″W	1034076	Somerset Hospital More images
Southwick Court Farmhouse	Southwick, Wiltshire	Farmhouse	Late 16th century	11 September 1968	ST8451155808; 51°18′04″N 2°13′25″W	1194818	Southwick Court Farmhouse More images
Spye Arch Lodge	Bowden Hill, Bromham, Wiltshire	Gate Lodge	16th century	19 March 1962	ST9417067938; 51°24′38″N 2°05′07″W	1033912	Spye Arch Lodge More images
St Cecilia's	Calne, Wiltshire	House	Early 19th century	19 May 1950	ST9966671170; 51°26′22″N 2°00′22″W	1247117	Upload Photo
St Edmund's School	Salisbury, Wiltshire	School	1860	12 October 1972	SU1458430349; 51°04′20″N 1°47′36″W	1273059	St Edmund's School More images
St Elizabeth's Convent and St Osmund's Roman Catholic Primary School	Salisbury, Wiltshire	Church School	c. 1890	28 February 1952	SU1450929217; 51°03′44″N 1°47′40″W	1023664	St Elizabeth's Convent and St Osmund's Roman Catholic Primary School More images
St Johns Court	Malmesbury, Wiltshire	Terrace	1966	18 January 1949	ST9351686945; 51°34′53″N 2°05′42″W	1269276	St Johns Court More images
St John's Hospital Chapel	Wilton, Wiltshire	House	18th century	4 August 1951	SU0941331440; 51°04′56″N 1°52′01″W	1198954	St John's Hospital Chapel More images
St Martin's House	Salisbury, Wiltshire	House	18th century	28 February 1952	SU1476829681; 51°03′59″N 1°47′26″W	1258755	St Martin's House
St Mary House	Chippenham, Wiltshire	House	Late 16th century	25 April 1950	ST9231473168; 51°27′27″N 2°06′43″W	1267937	Upload Photo
St Nicholas's Hospital	Salisbury, Wiltshire	Hospital	Founded in 13th century	28 February 1952	SU1439629143; 51°03′41″N 1°47′45″W	1259077	St Nicholas's Hospital More images
St Olaves	Bradford-on-Avon, Wiltshire	House	18th century	18 April 1952	ST8286460975; 51°20′51″N 2°14′51″W	1185137	St Olaves More images
Stable Block to Tottenham House	Great Bedwyn, Wiltshire	Stable	1818	22 August 1966	SU2490364129; 51°22′32″N 1°38′37″W	1365488	Upload Photo
Stables, Riding School and Entrance Archway to Corsham Court	Corsham Court, Corsham, Wiltshire	Stables	c1700-20	20 December 1960	ST8737770579; 51°26′03″N 2°10′59″W	1182308	Stables, Riding School and Entrance Archway to Corsham Court
Statue of Fame in Cupola, at South End of Parterre	Longford Park, Odstock, Wiltshire	Statue	1767	28 March 1985	SU1713626567; 51°02′18″N 1°45′25″W	1023842	Upload Photo
Staynings	Salisbury, Wiltshire	House	Early 18th century	28 February 1952	SU1421329799; 51°04′02″N 1°47′55″W	1023636	Staynings More images
Sticke Tennis Court to West of Hartham House	Hartham, Corsham, Wiltshire	Cricket Pavilion	Built 1890s	1 August 1986	ST8590772091; 51°26′51″N 2°12′15″W	1284355	Upload Photo
Store House and Animal House to the South East of Manor Farmhouse	Hankerton, Wiltshire	Animal House	1706	2 May 1977	ST9774690857; 51°37′00″N 2°02′02″W	1022244	Upload Photo
Stowford Manor	Wingfield, Wiltshire	Farmhouse	Late 15th century	13 November 1962	ST8110157672; 51°19′04″N 2°16′21″W	1180800	Upload Photo
Summer House at Milford Manor	Salisbury, Wiltshire	Summerhouse	Early 18th century	12 March 1984	SU1559629682; 51°03′59″N 1°46′44″W	1272838	Upload Photo
Summer House at Wilbury House	Newton Tony, Wiltshire	Summerhouse	c. 1710	29 May 1987	SU2227441610; 51°10′24″N 1°40′58″W	1313163	Upload Photo
Summer House in Garden of No 15, The Close	Salisbury, Wiltshire	Summerhouse	Late C17/Early 18th century	12 October 1972	SU1453929713; 51°04′00″N 1°47′38″W	1023590	Upload Photo
Sundial House	Bradford-on-Avon, Wiltshire	House	18th century	18 April 1952	ST8275461043; 51°20′54″N 2°14′56″W	1364480	Upload Photo
Sunton House	Sunton, Collingbourne Ducis, Wiltshire	House	c. 1710	4 June 1952	SU2428054768; 51°17′30″N 1°39′11″W	1285379	Upload Photo
Tedworth House	Tidworth, Wiltshire	Country House	c. 1860	24 October 1984	SU2327247545; 51°13′36″N 1°40′05″W	1339397	Tedworth House More images
Temple about 32m west of Belcombe Court	Bradford-on-Avon, Wiltshire	Garden Temple	1740s	18 April 1952	ST8170060621; 51°20′40″N 2°15′51″W	1036019	Upload Photo
Terraces with Ornamental Balustrades and Steps to South of the Hall, including retaining Walls running to East and West and Garden Wall	Bradford-on-Avon, Wiltshire	Terraces	18th century	23 August 1974	ST8285560886; 51°20′48″N 2°14′51″W	1036053	Terraces with Ornamental Balustrades and Steps to South of the Hall, including retaining Walls running to East and West and Garden Wall
The Ark	Devizes, Wiltshire	House	Early 19th century	9 April 1954	SU0047061191; 51°20′59″N 1°59′41″W	1250355	Upload Photo
The Bear Hotel	Devizes, Wiltshire	Wall	Early 19th century	9 April 1954	SU0035861448; 51°21′08″N 1°59′46″W	1250363	The Bear Hotel More images
The Black Swan Inn	Devizes, Wiltshire	Hotel	18th century	9 April 1954	SU0034961565; 51°21′11″N 1°59′47″W	1263051	The Black Swan Inn More images
The Cedars	Devizes, Wiltshire	House	Late 18th century	9 April 1954	ST9982561772; 51°21′18″N 2°00′14″W	1263761	Upload Photo
The Chantry	Mere, Wiltshire	House	1989	6 January 1966	ST8112932217; 51°05′20″N 2°16′15″W	1130724	Upload Photo
The Chantry	Warminster, Wiltshire	House	circa 1750-1760	28 April 1952	ST8731945154; 51°12′20″N 2°10′58″W	1036217	The Chantry More images
The Chantry and Little Chantry	Bradford-on-Avon, Wiltshire	House	16th century	18 April 1952	ST8232060845; 51°20′47″N 2°15′19″W	1364531	The Chantry and Little Chantry More images
The Cloisters	Salisbury, Wiltshire	Timber Framed House	C15/C16	28 February 1952	SU1457429685; 51°03′59″N 1°47′36″W	1273188	The Cloisters More images
The Cloisters, Iford Manor	Iford, Westwood, Wiltshire	Garden	1914	13 November 1962	ST8016158878; 51°19′43″N 2°17′10″W	1021878	The Cloisters, Iford Manor More images
The Conduit House	Bowden Hill, Lacock, Wiltshire	Conduit House	Mid 16th century	7 January 1987	ST9376667981; 51°24′39″N 2°05′28″W	1363959	Upload Photo
The Corner House	Lacock, Wiltshire	Cruck House	Early 17th century	20 December 1960	ST9155468557; 51°24′57″N 2°07′22″W	1363927	The Corner House More images
The Court House	Bratton, Wiltshire	Cross Passage House	Late 15th century	11 September 1968	ST9106152616; 51°16′21″N 2°07′46″W	1193662	The Court House More images
The Courthouse	Downton, Wiltshire	Detached House	Late 17th century	23 March 1960	SU1748421419; 50°59′31″N 1°45′08″W	1023905	Upload Photo
The Courts	Holt, Wiltshire	Country House	Early 18th century	13 November 1962	ST8611461803; 51°21′18″N 2°12′03″W	1364103	The Courts More images
The Deanery	Salisbury, Wiltshire	House	17th century	28 February 1952	SU1442729592; 51°03′56″N 1°47′44″W	1252023	The Deanery More images
The Dower House	Castle Combe, Wiltshire	House	Late 17th century	20 December 1960	ST8421777248; 51°29′38″N 2°13′43″W	1199036	The Dower House More images
The Downton Press and The White Horse	Downton, Wiltshire	House	Early 16th century	23 March 1960	SU1750521490; 50°59′33″N 1°45′07″W	1300702	The Downton Press and The White Horse More images
The Gatehouse and attached Front Wall on South Side	Chitterne, Wiltshire	Detached House	Late 16th century	11 September 1968	ST9916544222; 51°11′50″N 2°00′48″W	1364348	Upload Photo
The Georgian Boathouse	Fonthill Park, Fonthill Bishop, Wiltshire	Boat House	Mid 18th century	6 January 1966	ST9342032686; 51°05′36″N 2°05′43″W	1146058	Upload Photo
The Golden Gates, Bowood House	Derry Hill, Derry Hill & Studley, Wiltshire	Gate Lodge	C20	15 December 1972	ST9569070495; 51°26′00″N 2°03′48″W	1253792	The Golden Gates, Bowood House More images
The Greathouse	Kington Langley, Wiltshire	House	Late 17th century	20 December 1960	ST9295677077; 51°29′33″N 2°06′10″W	1022321	The Greathouse More images
The Grotto at Bowden Park	Bowden Park, Lacock, Wiltshire	Grotto	c. 1800	7 January 1987	ST9380368096; 51°24′43″N 2°05′26″W	1022134	Upload Photo
The Grove	Corsham, Wiltshire	House	1737	20 December 1960	ST8716370233; 51°25′51″N 2°11′10″W	1198550	The Grove More images
The Guildhall	Salisbury, Wiltshire	Guildhall	1788-1795	28 February 1952	SU1449729985; 51°04′08″N 1°47′40″W	1242739	The Guildhall More images
The Haunch of Venison	Salisbury, Wiltshire	House	Established 1320	28 February 1952	SU1436029960; 51°04′08″N 1°47′47″W	1273531	The Haunch of Venison More images
The Ivy Longhouse and the Ivy Stables	Chippenham, Wiltshire	House	1996	25 April 1950	ST9169773201; 51°27′28″N 2°07′15″W	1268174	Upload Photo
The Lansdowne Monument	Cherhill Down, Cherhill, Wiltshire	Obelisk	1845	31 July 1986	SU0477469309; 51°25′22″N 1°55′58″W	1253569	The Lansdowne Monument More images
The Manor House	Ansty, Wiltshire	Farmhouse	16th century	6 January 1966	ST9560526357; 51°02′12″N 2°03′51″W	1300354	The Manor House More images
The Manor House	Milton Lilbourne, Wiltshire	House	c1710-30	4 June 1952	SU1896760537; 51°20′37″N 1°43′45″W	1035694	The Manor House More images
The Manor House	Seend, Wiltshire	House	Before 1701	19 March 1962	ST9447161044; 51°20′54″N 2°04′51″W	1243854	The Manor House More images
The Manor House	Steeple Ashton, Wiltshire	House	c. 1900	11 September 1968	ST9070057170; 51°18′49″N 2°08′05″W	1252488	Upload Photo
The Manor House	Yatton Keynell, Wiltshire	Manor House	Possibly earlier-Pre 1659	20 December 1960	ST8644576279; 51°29′07″N 2°11′48″W	1300423	Upload Photo
The Manor House and Barn	Biddestone, Wiltshire	Cross Passage House	Possibly earlier-Pre 17th century	20 December 1960	ST8668073355; 51°27′32″N 2°11′35″W	1363596	The Manor House and Barn More images
The Market Cross	Devizes, Wiltshire	Market Cross	1814	9 April 1954	SU0040661486; 51°21′09″N 1°59′44″W	1250362	The Market Cross More images
The Mechanics' Institute	Swindon	Market Hall	1855	17 February 1970	SU1458084781; 51°33′42″N 1°47′28″W	1198947	The Mechanics' Institute More images
The Milford Arms	Salisbury, Wiltshire	House	C15/C16	12 October 1972	SU1464629958; 51°04′08″N 1°47′32″W	1258053	The Milford Arms More images
The Mount House	Great Somerford, Wiltshire	House	16th century	12 December 1951	ST9639783035; 51°32′46″N 2°03′12″W	1022515	The Mount House More images
The New Inn	Salisbury, Wiltshire	Cruck House	C15/C16	28 February 1952	SU1437629776; 51°04′02″N 1°47′46″W	1258368	The New Inn More images
The Obelisk	Warminster, Wiltshire	Obelisk	1783	28 April 1952	ST8695445133; 51°12′19″N 2°11′17″W	1194575	The Obelisk More images
The Old Court House	Castle Combe, Wiltshire	Jettied House	Early 16th century	20 December 1960	ST8421277154; 51°29′35″N 2°13′44″W	1022862	The Old Court House More images
The Old Manor House	Highworth, Swindon	House	Dated 1656	26 January 1955	SU2025092453; 51°37′50″N 1°42′32″W	1355951	The Old Manor House More images
The Old Manor House	Milston, Wiltshire	Manor House	1613	10 January 1953	SU1622845234; 51°12′22″N 1°46′09″W	1318536	Upload Photo
The Old Parsonage	Steeple Ashton, Wiltshire	House	Early 15th century	11 September 1968	ST9078456956; 51°18′42″N 2°08′01″W	1252695	Upload Photo
The Old Town Hall	Devizes, Wiltshire	Town Hall	During erection of present	9 April 1954	SU0043861416; 51°21′07″N 1°59′42″W	1252446	The Old Town Hall More images
The Old Vicarage and attached Railings	Chippenham, Wiltshire	Vicarage	Late C17/Early 18th century	25 April 1950	ST9232673227; 51°27′29″N 2°06′43″W	1267908	The Old Vicarage and attached Railings More images
The Pheasant Inn and Crewe's Hall	Salisbury, Wiltshire	Inn	15th century	28 February 1952	SU1455930177; 51°04′15″N 1°47′37″W	1243120	The Pheasant Inn and Crewe's Hall More images
The Priory Barn	Bradford-on-Avon, Wiltshire	Tithe Barn	late medieval	18 April 1952	ST8247361065; 51°20′54″N 2°15′11″W	1364527	The Priory Barn More images
The former Queen's Head Inn	Dunkirk, Devizes, Wiltshire	Terrace	18th century	9 April 1954	ST9940861924; 51°21′23″N 2°00′36″W	1249469	The former Queen's Head Inn More images
The Red House at Eastwell House	Potterne, Wiltshire	Garden Building	c. 1700	19 March 1962	ST9935858004; 51°19′16″N 2°00′38″W	1258775	Upload Photo
The Rose and Crown Inn	East Harnham, Salisbury, Wiltshire	Timber Framed House	16th century	28 February 1952	SU1428428983; 51°03′36″N 1°47′51″W	1242271	The Rose and Crown Inn More images
The Royal George Public House including Part of former No 19	Salisbury, Wiltshire	House	18th century	12 October 1972	SU1452630267; 51°04′18″N 1°47′39″W	1248750	The Royal George Public House including Part of former No 19 More images
The Sanctuary	Steeple Ashton, Wiltshire	House	Early 16th century	29 January 1988	ST9084356954; 51°18′42″N 2°07′58″W	1252506	The Sanctuary
The Sham Ruin	Corsham Court, Corsham, Wiltshire	Grotto	c. 1797	1 August 1986	ST8734070575; 51°26′03″N 2°11′01″W	1284571	The Sham Ruin
The Sign of the Angel	Lacock, Wiltshire	House	Early C20	20 December 1960	ST9158968574; 51°24′58″N 2°07′20″W	1198180	The Sign of the Angel More images
The Spectrum Building (formerly the Renault Distribution Centre)	Swindon		1981-2	18 September 2013	SU1227285351; 51°34′01″N 1°49′28″W	1416061	The Spectrum Building (formerly the Renault Distribution Centre) More images
The Tounson Almshouses	Calne, Wiltshire	Cross Passage House	1950	19 May 1950	ST9990670868; 51°26′13″N 2°00′10″W	1270992	The Tounson Almshouses More images
The Town Hall	Devizes, Wiltshire	Town Hall	1806-08	9 April 1954	SU0046861335; 51°21′04″N 1°59′41″W	1262331	The Town Hall More images
The Town Hall	Westbury, Wiltshire	Town Hall	Early 19th century	29 December 1950	ST8739251524; 51°15′46″N 2°10′55″W	1036308	The Town Hall More images
The Wardrobe	Salisbury, Wiltshire	House	1254	28 February 1952	SU1413429668; 51°03′58″N 1°47′59″W	1254383	The Wardrobe More images
The White House	Highworth, Swindon	House	Late 17th century	26 January 1955	SU2001692469; 51°37′50″N 1°42′44″W	1023387	Upload Photo
The Woodhouse	Chippenham, Wiltshire	House	Late C16-Early 17th century	25 April 1950	ST9233973199; 51°27′28″N 2°06′42″W	1267949	The Woodhouse More images
Tidcombe Manor	Tidcombe, Tidcombe and Fosbury, Wiltshire	House	Mid-Late 18th century	22 August 1966	SU2898858380; 51°19′26″N 1°35′07″W	1365508	Tidcombe Manor More images
Tower House	Malmesbury, Wiltshire	House	Mid 16th century	18 January 1949	ST9342687256; 51°35′03″N 2°05′47″W	1269271	Tower House More images
Trowle Manor Farmhouse	Trowle Common, Trowbridge, Wiltshire	Farmhouse	Older	26 November 1976	ST8417458660; 51°19′37″N 2°13′43″W	1021662	Upload Photo
Turleigh Manor	Turleigh, Winsley, Wiltshire	House	Late 17th century to early 18th century	13 November 1962	ST8049060747; 51°20′44″N 2°16′53″W	1021905	Upload Photo
Turner Memorial in the Churchyard about 45m south of Lady Chapel of the Church of St Michael	Melksham, Wiltshire	Chest Tomb	Early 19th century	13 February 1985	ST9026563678; 51°22′19″N 2°08′28″W	1021708	Upload Photo
Two former Hangars on North Side of former Airfield	Yatesbury, Cherhill, Wiltshire	Aircraft Hangar	1916	25 November 1987	SU0520771296; 51°26′26″N 1°55′35″W	1283146	Two former Hangars on North Side of former Airfield
Two Monuments in the Churchyard between 11m and 13m north of Tower of Church of St Mary the Virgin	Steeple Ashton, Wiltshire	Chest Tomb	Early to Mid 18th century	11 September 1968	ST9062557135; 51°18′48″N 2°08′09″W	1252398	Upload Photo
Unidentified Monument in Churchyard, 3m south of Lady Chapel, Church of St Mary	Bishops Cannings, Wiltshire	Chest Tomb	15th century	29 April 1987	SU0378864166; 51°22′36″N 1°56′49″W	1365975	Upload Photo
Upavon Camp (Officers' Mess), Building 21	Trenchard Lines, Upavon, Wiltshire	Officers Mess	1914-1915	3 June 1986	SU1550654878; 51°17′34″N 1°46′44″W	1365554	Upload Photo
Upham House	Upper Upham, Aldbourne, Wiltshire	Country House	possibly earlier work	22 August 1966	SU2292777136; 51°29′34″N 1°40′16″W	1200440	Upham House More images
Urchfont Manor	Urchfont, Wiltshire	House	15th century	19 March 1962	SU0358356962; 51°18′42″N 1°57′00″W	1035857	Urchfont Manor More images
Vale House	Salisbury, Wiltshire	House	18th century	28 February 1952	SU1476129648; 51°03′58″N 1°47′27″W	1273247	Vale House
Vastern House	Vastern, Wootton Bassett, Wiltshire	House	15th century core	15 August 1985	SU0495381421; 51°31′54″N 1°55′48″W	1300114	Vastern House
Vernleaze and attached Service Range and Garden Wall	Calne, Wiltshire	House	Early 19th century	19 May 1950	ST9959070122; 51°25′48″N 2°00′26″W	1247357	Upload Photo
Victoria Hall	Salisbury, Wiltshire	House	1716	28 February 1952	SU1460230096; 51°04′12″N 1°47′35″W	1273287	Victoria Hall
Village Cross in Schoolyard	Lacock, Wiltshire	Village Cross	Late Medieval	20 December 1960	ST9157868436; 51°24′54″N 2°07′21″W	1363937	Village Cross in Schoolyard More images
Village Farmhouse	Charlton, Wiltshire	Farmhouse	Late 17th century	12 December 1951	ST9643388956; 51°35′58″N 2°03′10″W	1022224	Upload Photo
Villetts House	Swindon	House	1729	2 October 1951	SU1574683807; 51°33′11″N 1°46′27″W	1355900	Villetts House More images
Wall along Street to north of No 5, St Margaret's Place	Bradford-on-Avon, Wiltshire	House	18th century	18 April 1952	ST8263160727; 51°20′43″N 2°15′03″W	1364496	Upload Photo
Walls of Bailey to Old Wardour Castle	Wardour Park, Tisbury, Wiltshire	Wall	1570s	6 July 1987	ST9383826396; 51°02′13″N 2°05′21″W	1318789	Upload Photo
Warminster School	Warminster, Wiltshire	School	Mid 19th century	28 April 1952	ST8695345367; 51°12′26″N 2°11′17″W	1193680	Warminster School More images
Well Close House	Bradford-on-Avon, Wiltshire	House	17th century	23 August 1974	ST8209360720; 51°20′43″N 2°15′31″W	1036017	Upload Photo
West Court Farmhouse	Shalbourne, Wiltshire	Farmhouse	C15-C17	30 July 1986	SU3138962669; 51°21′44″N 1°33′02″W	1033981	Upload Photo
West Hill House	Calne, Wiltshire	Apartment	1950	19 May 1950	ST9967271058; 51°26′19″N 2°00′22″W	1247319	Upload Photo
West Portal of Box Tunnel	Box, Wiltshire	Railway Tunnel Portal	c. 1840	24 July 1985	ST8292768905; 51°25′08″N 2°14′49″W	1284962	West Portal of Box Tunnel
West Portal of Middlehill Tunnel	Middlehill, Box, Wiltshire	Railway Tunnel Portal	1840	27 July 1985	ST8194068730; 51°25′02″N 2°15′40″W	1022803	Upload Photo
Westbury Conservative Club (Ferndale House)	Westbury, Wiltshire	Wall	Early 18th century	29 December 1950	ST8741751566; 51°15′47″N 2°10′54″W	1194765	Westbury Conservative Club (Ferndale House) More images
Westbury House. Railings along east Side and walled Forecourt to south of Westbury House	Bradford-on-Avon, Wiltshire	House	Early 18th century	18 April 1952	ST8254060864; 51°20′48″N 2°15′07″W	1036119	Westbury House. Railings along east Side and walled Forecourt to south of Westbury House More images
Westcroft	Trowbridge, Wiltshire	House	1784	29 December 1950	ST8541358261; 51°19′24″N 2°12′39″W	1182520	Westcroft More images
Whistley House	Potterne, Wiltshire	Country House	18th century	19 March 1962	ST9879959244; 51°19′56″N 2°01′07″W	1243109	Upload Photo
White Hart Hotel	Calne, Wiltshire	Inn	Late 16th century	19 May 1950	ST9993670696; 51°26′07″N 2°00′08″W	1247314	White Hart Hotel More images
White Hart Hotel	Salisbury, Wiltshire	Hotel	Late 18th century	28 February 1952	SU1457129722; 51°04′00″N 1°47′36″W	1258980	White Hart Hotel More images
Wilcot Manor House	Wilcot, Wiltshire	Manor House	Early 17th century	4 June 1952	SU1397660790; 51°20′46″N 1°48′03″W	1364664	Upload Photo
William IV Public House	Salisbury, Wiltshire	House	17th century	12 October 1972	SU1465829924; 51°04′06″N 1°47′32″W	1259805	William IV Public House
Wilsford House	Wilsford, Wilsford cum Lake, Wiltshire	House	1904-6	15 April 1987	SU1340139731; 51°09′24″N 1°48′35″W	1131008	Upload Photo
Wilton Windmill	Wilton, Grafton, Wiltshire	Tower Mill	1821	30 July 1986	SU2756561620; 51°21′11″N 1°36′20″W	1034034	Wilton Windmill More images
Woolley Grange	Woolley Green, Bradford-on-Avon, Wiltshire	Manor House	17th century	23 August 1974	ST8367461553; 51°21′10″N 2°14′09″W	1036151	Woolley Grange More images
Woolmore Farmhouse	Bowerhill, Melksham Without, Wiltshire	Farmhouse	1631	13 February 1985	ST9163062493; 51°21′41″N 2°07′18″W	1021762	Upload Photo
Workshop 25m north-east of Church of St James	Ansty Village, Ansty, Wiltshire	Banqueting House	1570-80	6 January 1966	ST9567726342; 51°02′11″N 2°03′47″W	1318675	Workshop 25m north-east of Church of St James More images
Wroughton House	Wroughton, Swindon	Cross Passage House	Early 18th century	26 January 1955	SU1381880256; 51°31′16″N 1°48′08″W	1185607	Upload Photo
Zealys House	Chippenham, Wiltshire	Town House	Early 18th century	25 April 1950	ST9233573208; 51°27′28″N 2°06′42″W	1267907	Zealys House More images

== See also ==
- Grade I listed buildings in Wiltshire
- Grade II* listed buildings in Wiltshire
