= Old Town Hall, Devizes =

Municipal building in Devizes, Wiltshire, England

Old Town Hall
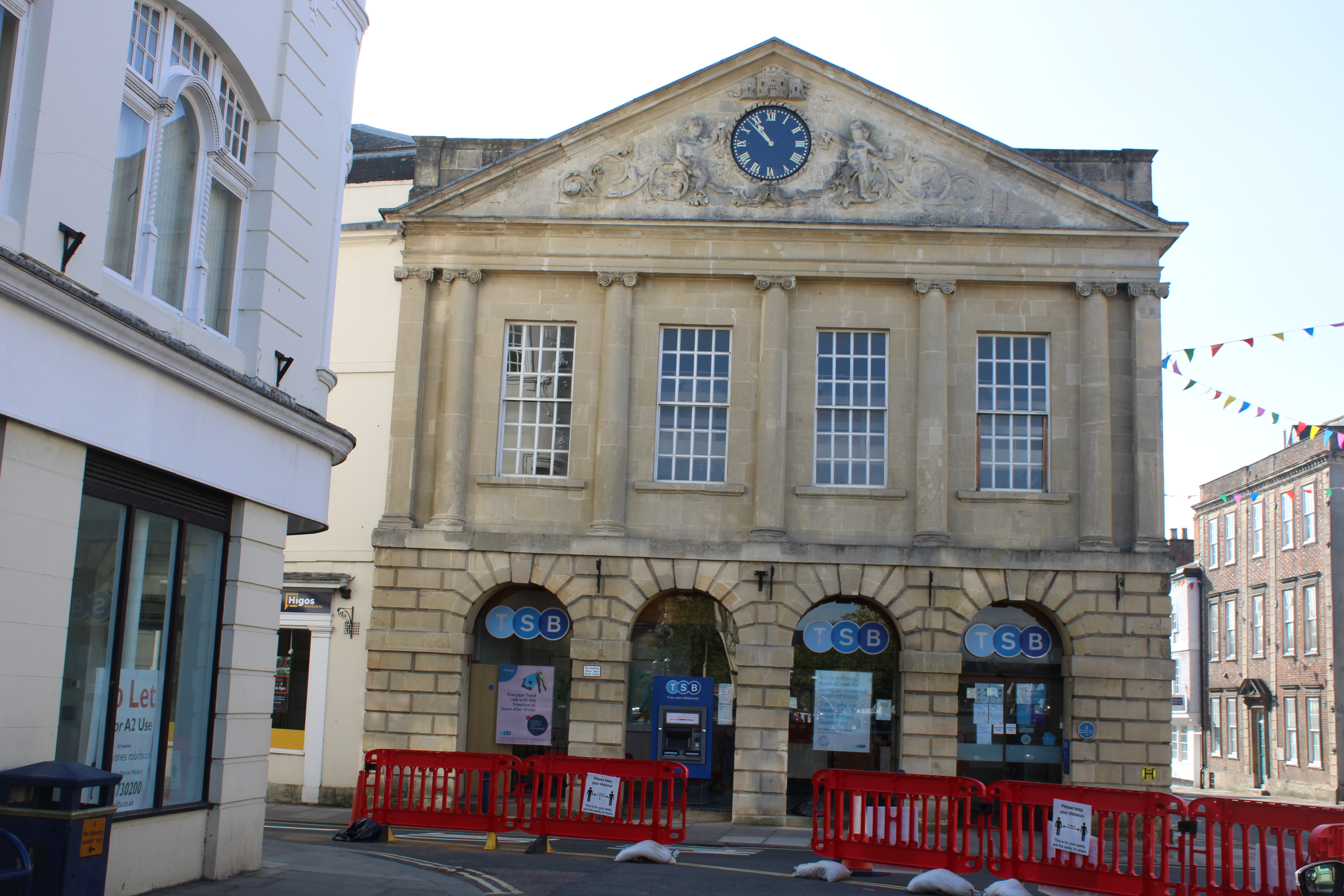
- The building in 2020

- Shown in Wiltshire
- 51.3518°N 1.9951°W
- Location: Wine Street, Devizes

History
- Built: 1752

Site notes
- Architect: Mr. Lawrence
- Architectural style: Neoclassical style

Listed Building – Grade II*
- Official name: The Old Town Hall
- Designated: 8 April 1954
- Reference no.: 1252446

The Old Town Hall is a historic building in Wine Street in Devizes, a town in Wiltshire, in England. The structure, which was completed in 1752 and has seen various commercial uses since it was superseded by a new town hall in 1808, is a Grade II* listed building.

== History ==
The building was commissioned as a cheese hall for the town. The site selected was on the corner of Wine Street and St John's Street, just to the south of the town's Market Place. Work on the building started in 1750. It was designed by an architect named Lawrence in the neoclassical style, built in ashlar stone and was completed in 1752. The design involved a symmetrical main frontage with four bays facing onto Wine Street; on the ground floor, which was rusticated, there were four round-headed openings. These were originally open, but by the mid-19th century had been filled in with windows and doors. On the first floor, there were four sash windows flanked by Ionic order columns, as well as two corner piers supporting an entablature and a pediment with a clock flanked by carved figures of Cupid in the tympanum.

The building was largely used as a market hall, with the ground floor hosting the town's cheese market. Between 1785 and 1787 the room on the first floor served as an arsenal for the Royal Wiltshire Militia, while at other times it served as the mess hall of the Devizes Loyal Volunteers, and also as a Sunday school. While the current Devizes Town Hall was under construction, between 1806 and 1808, the room on the first floor was briefly used as a venue for council meetings. It was then let out for commercial use in 1809 and sold in 1825.

In 1836, the building was acquired by a firm of wine merchants, Messrs Cunnington, which used the basement and the vaults below for storage of wines and spirits. From 1848, the room on the first floor served as the museum, library and reading rooms of the town's literary and scientific institution. The building accommodated the expanded firm of wine merchants, Cunnington, Williams & Sons, until the mid-20th century. The building was Grade II* listed in 1954.

For much of the second half of the 20th century, the ground floor of the building was occupied by a branch of Cheltenham & Gloucester; it was re-branded as a branch of TSB Bank in 2013. After TSB Bank closed its branch in Wine Street in April 2021, the ground floor became the home of a ladies' fashion shop, Hen House, in autumn 2022. Meanwhile, the first floor served as the auction rooms of Henry Aldridge and Son, before becoming the Wine Street Gallery in the mid-1990s: the gallery continued to display the work of local artists until April 2009.

In July 2025, Henry Aldridge and Son, a local firm of auctioneers, purchased the freehold of the old town hall. They plan to base their world-famous Titanic auctions on the ground floor of the property.

== See also ==
- Grade II* listed buildings in Wiltshire (P–Z)
