= Royal Wiltshire Militia =

Auxiliary force of the British Army

Royal Wiltshire Militia 3rd Battalion, Wiltshire Regiment
- Active: 1558–1 April 1953
- Country: England (1558–1707); Kingdom of Great Britain (1707–1800); United Kingdom (1801–1953)
- Branch: Militia/Special Reserve
- Role: Infantry
- Size: 1–4 Battalions
- Part of: Wiltshire Regiment (Duke of Edinburgh's)
- Garrison/HQ: Devizes; Marlborough (1816–52)
- Engagements: Sedgemoor

Commanders
- Notable commanders: Thomas Herbert, 8th Earl of Pembroke; Col John Wyndham; Thomas Brudenell-Bruce, 1st Earl of Ailesbury; Henry Herbert, 1st Earl of Carnarvon; John Hobhouse, 1st Baron Broughton; Frederick Methuen, 2nd Baron Methuen

The Royal Wiltshire Militia was an auxiliary regiment of the British Army from the English county of Wiltshire. From their formal organisation as Trained Bands in 1558 until their final service in the Special Reserve, the Militia regiments of the county carried out internal security and garrison duties at home and overseas in all of Britain's major wars. The Wiltshire Militia was active in suppressing Monmouth's Rebellion in 1685 and was present at the Battle of Sedgemoor. It became a battalion of the Wiltshire Regiment in 1881 and trained thousands of reservists and recruits during World War I. It maintained a shadowy existence until final disbandment in 1953.

== Early history ==
The English militia was descended from the Anglo-Saxon Fyrd, the military force raised from the freemen of the shires under command of their Sheriffs. Wiltshire levies served in Alfred the Great's army of Wessex that defeated the Danes at the Battle of Edington at Westbury in 878. The shire levies continued under the Norman kings, and were reorganised under the Assizes of Arms of 1181 and 1252, and again by King Edward I's Statute of Winchester of 1285.

Under this statute 'Commissioners of Array' would levy the required number of men from each shire. The usual shire contingent was 1000 infantry commanded by a millenar, divided into companies of 100 commanded by centenars or constables, and subdivided into platoons of 20 led by vintenars. (John E. Morris, the historian of Edward's Welsh Wars writing in 1901, likened this process to calling out the Militia Battalion of the county regiment.) King Edward I made use of this mechanism in this Welsh and Scottish campaigns. As an inland county Wiltshire avoided most of these demands, but King Edward II called the first national levy in July 1322 for his failed Scottish campaign. Thereafter Wiltshire provided soldiers for all six national levies between 1322 and 1338 for service in the Scottish Wars and Flanders campaign.

When invasion threatened in 1539, Henry VIII held a Great Muster of all the counties, recording the number of armed men available in each hundred and tithing. The detailed list for Wiltshire, including the city of Salisbury, has some 5,900 men.

== Wiltshire Trained Bands ==
The legal basis of the militia was updated by two acts of 1557 covering musters (4 & 5 Ph. & M. c. 3) and the maintenance of horses and armour (4 & 5 Ph. & M. c. 2). The county militia was now under the Lord Lieutenant, assisted by the deputy lieutenants (DLs) and justices of the peace (JPs). The entry into force of these acts in 1558 is seen as the starting date for the organised county militia in England. Wiltshire was one of the southern counties called upon to send troops to suppress the Rising of the North in 1569. Although the militia obligation was universal, this assembly confirmed that it was impractical to train and equip every able-bodied man. After 1572, the practice was to select a proportion of men for the Trained Bands (TBs), who were mustered for regular training.

The threat of invasion during the Spanish War led to an increase in training. From 1584 the government emphasised the 17 'maritime' counties most vulnerable to attack, which included Wiltshire. These were given a smaller quota of men to fill, but were expected to train them better, for which they were supplied with experienced captains. Wiltshire was to supply 1,200 trained men, divided into 700 'shot' (equipped with firearms), 200 bowmen and 300 'corslets' (armoured men, signifying pikemen). During the Spanish Armada crisis in 1588, the county supplied its 1,200 trained men, formed into companies of 100, together with 25 lancers and 100 light horsemen, and a further 1,200 untrained men who would have acted as pioneers.

In the 16th century, little distinction was made between the militia and the troops levied by the counties for overseas expeditions. Between 1585 and 1601 Wiltshire supplied 795 levies for service in Ireland, 350 for France, and 560 for the Netherlands. However, the counties usually conscripted the unemployed and criminals rather than the Trained Bandsmen – in 1585 the Privy Council had ordered the impressment of able-bodied unemployed men, and the Queen ordered 'none of her trayned-bands to be pressed'. Replacing the weapons issued to the levies from the militia armouries was a heavy cost on the counties.

With the passing of the threat of invasion, the trained bands declined in the early 17th century. Later, Charles I attempted to reform them into a national force or 'Perfect Militia', answering to the king rather than local control. In 1638 the Wiltshire TBs (including the Salisbury Trained Band) consisted of 1,285 musketeers and 1,115 corslets; in addition the TB Horse comprised 30 lancers and 126 light horse.

In 1639 and 1640, Charles attempted to employ the TBs for the Bishops' Wars in Scotland. However, many of those sent on this unpopular service were untrained replacements and conscripts, and many officers were corrupt or inefficient. For the Second Bishops' War of 1640, Wiltshire was ordered to march 1,300 men to Newcastle upon Tyne. Some Wiltshire trained bandsmen protested at having to pay the tax for the levy (coat-and-conduct money), arguing that their service gave them exemption. When these protesters were imprisoned at Marlborough their comrades broke them out. A Wiltshire company mustered at Warminster refused to serve under Captain Drury, a suspected Roman Catholic, because he would not take communion with them. When the army marched north, Colonel Sir John Beaumont's regiment of West Countrymen from Wiltshire, Somerset and Bristol marauded through Derbyshire, being encouraged by the local inhabitants to break down the hated enclosures, destroying a mill belonging to the unpopular former Secretary of State, Sir John Coke and threatening to burn down his house. Beaumont and his officers were unable to control them. The Scottish campaign ended in failure.

=== Civil War ===
Control of the TBs was one of the major points of dispute between Charles I and Parliament that led to the First English Civil War. When open warfare broke out, neither side made much use of the TBs beyond securing the county armouries for their own full-time troops who would serve anywhere in the country, many of whom were former trained bandsmen, or using the TBs as auxiliary units for garrisons. Wiltshire generally supported Parliament, which appointed Philip Herbert, 4th Earl of Pembroke, to organise the Wiltshire TBs. However, the Royalists quickly overran the county, capturing Marlborough in 1642 and raising the siege of Devizes in 1643 by winning the Battle of Roundway Down. The New Model Army did not capture Devizes until 1645.

As Parliament tightened its grip on the country after the Second English Civil War, it passed new Militia Acts in 1648 and 1650 that replaced lords lieutenant with county commissioners appointed by Parliament or the Council of State. From now on, the term 'Trained Band' began to disappear in most counties. Under the Commonwealth and Protectorate, the militia received pay when called out, and operated alongside the Army to control the country. Many militia regiments were called out in 1651 during the Scottish invasion (the Worcester campaign) and the Wiltshires were part of a concentration ordered at Gloucester.

== Restoration Militia ==
During the turmoil over the Restoration of the Monarchy in 1661, the Wiltshire Militia were deployed to seize arms and secure suspected persons, with two companies of foot at Malmesbury and a troop of horse at Devizes. The English Militia was re-established in 1662 under the Militia Act of 1661. It was once again under the control of the king's lords-lieutenant, the men to be selected by ballot. This was popularly seen as the 'constitutional force' to counterbalance a 'standing army' tainted by association with the New Model Army that had supported Cromwell's military dictatorship, and almost the whole burden of home defence and internal security was entrusted to the militia under politically reliable local landowners. In 1661 the deputy lieutenants of Wiltshire were urged to organise their militia quickly and asked for additional DLs to be appointed, because so many of them were officeholders in London and frequently absent from the county. The Wiltshire Militia was soon active in hunting down 'fanaticks' from the previous regime. When the Dutch carried out a Raid on the Medway in June 1667, Wiltshire was ordered to send three foot companies and a troop of horse to bolster the defences of the Isle of Wight.

The hundreds of Wiltshire were traditionally organised into four 'divisions' centred on Salisbury (or 'Sarum'), Marlborough, Devizes and Warminster, and after the Restoration each division provided a regiment of foot and a troop of horse. By 1685 these were as follows:

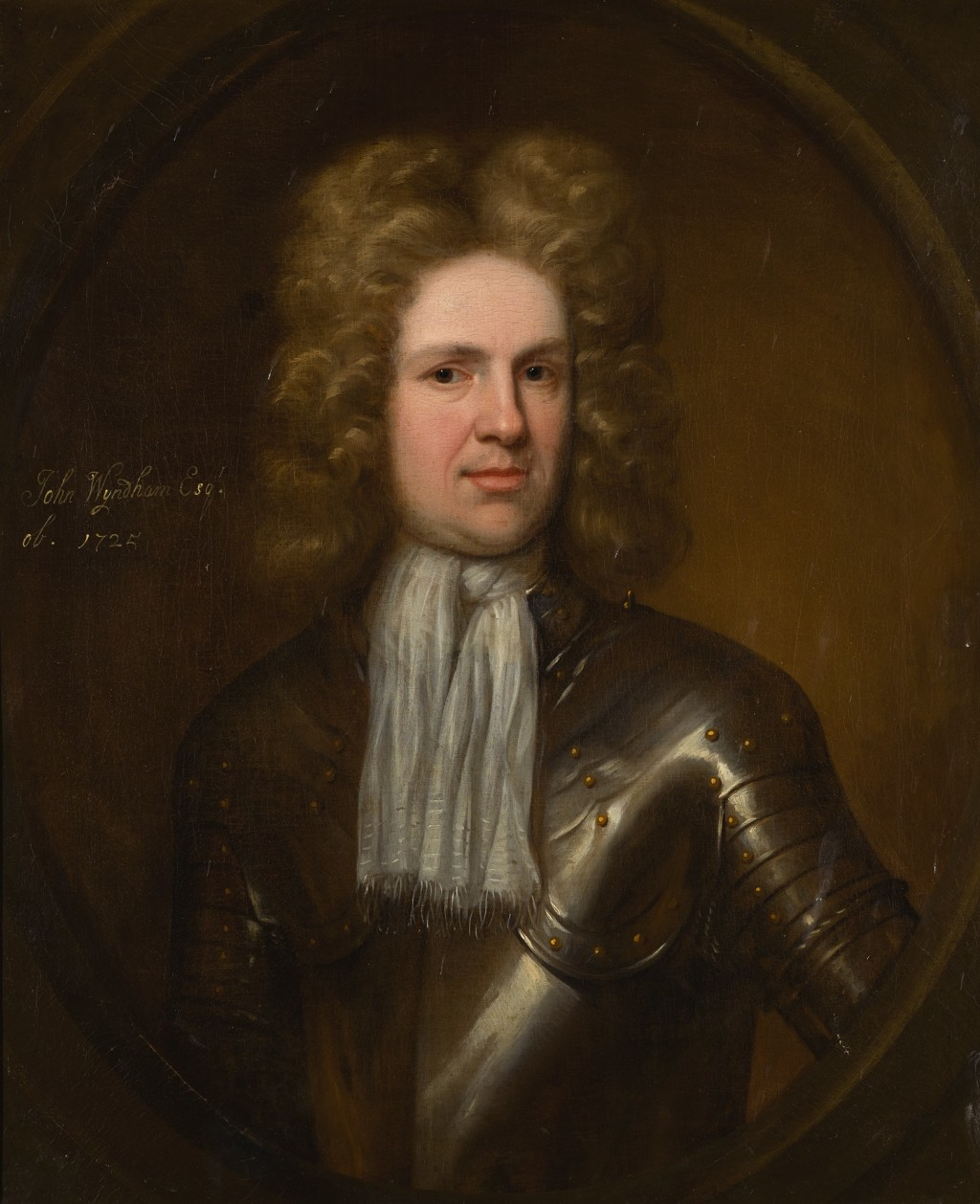
Colonel John Wyndham of Norrington.

- Salisbury Regiment (The Red Regiment) – 5 companies, 540 men, under Colonel John Wyndham of Norrington, Member of Parliament (MP) for Salisbury
  - Lieutenant-Colonel John Young of Little Durnford
  - Major William Hearst
  - Captain Gabriel Ashby
  - Captain John Davenant of Landford
- Marlborough Regiment (The Blue Regiment) – Col Ducket?
- Devizes Regiment (The Green Regiment) – Col Henry Chivers
- Warminster Regiment (The Yellow Regiment) – Col Edward Baynton, JP
- New Sarum Company (The Mayor's Men) – 1 company, 110 men
- Wiltshire Horse, 4 troops, 230 men – Col Thomas Penruddocke, DL, former MP for Wilton
  - Maj Sharington Talbot of Lacock Abbey, MP for Chippenham
  - Capt Willoughby
  - Capt Maskelyn

=== Monmouth's rebellion ===
In 1685 there was a rebellion against King James II. Its leader, the exiled Duke of Monmouth, landed with his supporters at Lyme Regis in Dorset on 11 June 1685. As his rebels mustered, the government of James II responded by declaring him a traitor and calling out the militia on 13 June, while the regulars of the Royal army were assembled. The Wiltshire Militia mustered at Salisbury on 17 June under the command of Thomas Herbert, 8th Earl of Pembroke, Lord Lieutenant of Wiltshire. The whole Wiltshire contingent probably totalled some 2000 foot and 200 horse.

After mustering and organising, the Wiltshire Militia moved out to Wilton to meet the ammunition wagons and supplies on 20 June. Under Pembroke's command it then marched 49 miles (79 km) in three days via Market Lavington and Chippenham (where it was met by the King's commander-in-chief, the Earl of Feversham with a detachment of the Horse Guards) to Bath, where the Royal army was concentrating. On 24 June, Wyndham's Red Regiment was sent to Bradford-on-Avon. That night there was an alarm, and believing it was being attacked by the whole rebel army, the regiment retreated 4 miles (6.4 km) to Trowbridge. Although the retreat was rapid, and it took some time to rally the regiment afterwards in the darkness, it was not a complete rout, the regiment having time to pack and harness up the wagons and officers' carriages and take them to Trowbridge.

Hearing that Frome had declared for Monmouth, Pembroke marched out from Trowbridge on 25 June with Penruddocke's, Willoughby's, and Maskelyn's troops of Militia Horse, with 36 musketeers of the Red Regiment mounted behind some of the troopers. On arrival he found a large number of rebel recruits who had come in from Warminster and Westbury, some armed with pistols or pikes, others with scythes and clubs. Despite being heavily outnumbered, Pembroke entered the town at the head of his musketeers, followed by the horse. A shot was fired at him, but the rebels soon broke and ran before the advancing militia. The rebels made a stand at the bridge, but the militia captured this and dispersed them. The townsfolk were overawed and disarmed, and the constable who had posted Monmouth's proclamation was arrested. One militia musketeer was fatally injured by his own weapon.

On the same day Monmouth had crossed the River Avon at Keynsham between Bath and Bristol but was attacked from north and south by bodies of Royal horse. One of these, led by Col Theophilus Oglethorpe with 100 troopers of the Horse Guards and Maj Talbot's Troop of Wiltshire Horse Militia, had been operating in the Chew Valley to overawe the population. Oglethorpe launched his regular troopers into Keynsham, causing casualties and great confusion among the rebel army, then withdrew, covered by Talbot's men who had been posted for the purpose. Disheartened, Monmouth turned away from Keynsham.

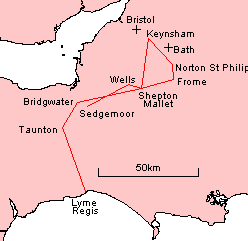
Monmouth's route to Sedgemoor.

While the bulk of Feversham's army gathered at Bristol and Bath, blocking the Avon, and Lord Churchill harried their rear, there was still a route open for Monmouth's army to move up the main road via Warminster and Devizes, carrying the rebellion into Wiltshire and Berkshire and opening the road to London. However, on 28 June this route was blocked by Pembroke with his Wiltshire Militia (less Talbot's troop and some foot, which he had probably left at Bath) together with some Hampshire Militia. On alarm of the rebels' advance, the Red and Blue Wiltshire Regiments and the Yellow Hampshire Regiment formed up at Bratton Lane near Westbury, though no attack came.

Feversham now moved his army to Westbury to join Pembroke, and began a pursuit of the disheartened rebels, who were retreating into Somerset. The Wiltshire Red Regiment marched via Frome, Shepton Mallet, Glastonbury and Somerton, reaching the King's Sedgemoor on 4 July. The whole army camped around Westonzoyland on the night of 5/6 July, with the three Wiltshire foot regiments bivouacked at Middlezoy and Othery, while the rebels were billeted in Bridgwater. That night Monmouth attempted a night attack on the Royal camp, but his advance was spotted and the army turned out to repel the attack. Pembroke galloped up to Wyndham's headquarters and ordered him to beat to quarters. Drummer Adam Wheeler of the Colonel's Company beat the alarm and the regiment fell in and marched up to Westonzoyland, where it formed a three-deep line ready to engage. The Wiltshire Militia remained in reserve and took no active part in the Battle of Sedgemoor, which lasted two hours and resulted in the total rout of Monmouth's rebel army. Wyndham refused to allow his men to fall out to pillage the battlefield, in case the rebels rallied.

The fresh militia were used to pursue the rebels after the battle. Wyndham's regiment was assigned to guarding prisoners in Westonzoyland church, with Drummer Wheeler taking down the numbers as they were brought in from the moor. The regiment then marched back to Glastonbury, where six rebels were hanged. At the White Hart at Glastonbury, Maj Talbot fell into a dispute with a Capt Love over whose soldiers had done best; apparently the effectiveness of Talbot's men at Keynsham was questioned. Both officers drew their swords and Talbot was killed. Afterwards, Wyndham's Regiment was tasked with guarding the Royal army's artillery and baggage back to Devizes, where the regiment was disembodied and the men sent home.

James distrusted the militia under its county landed gentry, and neglected it in favour of a greatly increased regular army. However, when William of Orange landed in the West Country in 1688 he was virtually unopposed by the army or the militia, and deposed James II in the Glorious Revolution. The militia organisation continued unchanged under William, though a few officers were changed. In Wiltshire John Wyndham, a High Tory, was replaced as colonel of the Red Regiment by Sir Thomas Mompesson, a Whig. Mompesson, MP for Old Sarum, was a former colonel in the Wiltshire Militia and a member of the Honourable Artillery Company of London. After the naval defeat at the Battle of Beachy Head in 1690, when the king was absent with most of the regular army campaigning in Ireland, the whole of the militia was called out, and the Wiltshire regiments formed part of a camp of 20,000 men near Portsmouth until the crisis was over.

In 1697 the counties were required to submit detailed lists of their militia. The Wiltshire militia still comprised a foot regiment and troop of horse from each of the 'divisions':

- Red Regiment (Sarum Division) – 534 men in 6 companies, Col Sir Thomas Mompesson
- 'Blew' Regiment (Marlborough Division) – 749 men in 6 companies, Col Edmund Webb
- Green Regiment (Devizes Division) – 514 in 6 companies, Col Henry Chivers
- Yellow Regiment (Warminster Division) – 432 men in 4 companies, Col Henry Bayntun of Spye Park
- New Sarum (Salisbury) Company – 128 men, Capt George Clement
- Regiment of Horse – 232 men in 4 troops, Col Thomas Penruddocke

However, the Militia passed into virtual abeyance during the long peace after the Treaty of Utrecht in 1713, and few units were called out during the Jacobite Risings of 1715 and 1745.

== 1757 Reforms ==
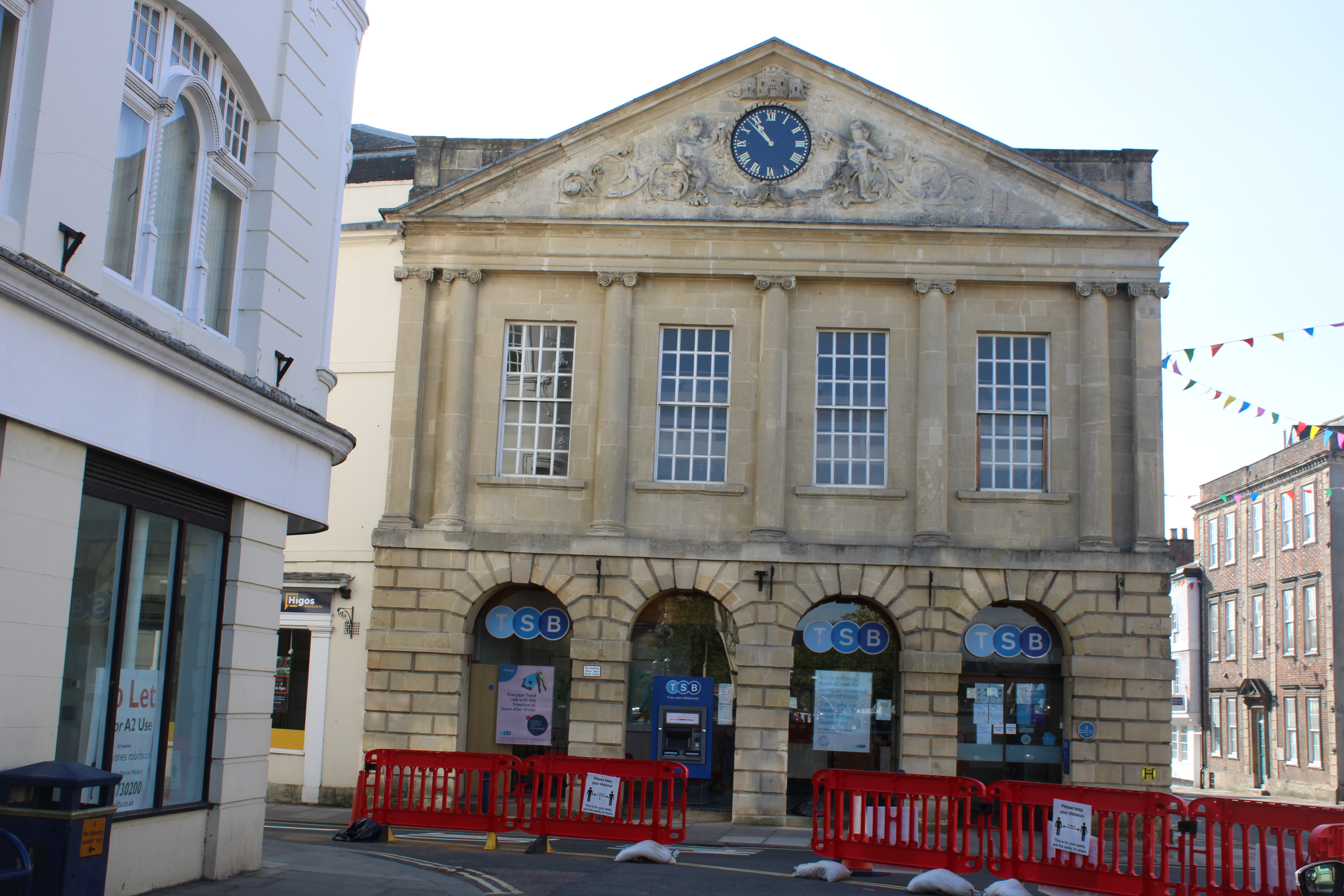
The Old Town Hall, Devizes

Under threat of French invasion during the Seven Years' War, a series of Militia Acts from 1757 reorganised the county militia regiments, the men being conscripted by means of parish ballots (paid substitutes were permitted) to serve for three years. In peacetime they assembled for 28 days' annual training. There was a property qualification for officers, who were commissioned by the lord lieutenant. An adjutant and drill sergeants were to be provided to each regiment from the regular Army, and arms and accoutrements would be supplied when the county had secured 60 per cent of its quota of recruits.

Wiltshire was given a quota of 800 men to raise. The Lord Lieutenant, Henry Herbert, 10th Earl of Pembroke, held his meetings with his DLs in the Old Town Hall at Devizes and organised the parish ballots. The process went smoothly and Wiltshire was the third county to have its arms issued, on 8 November 1758. Lord Bruce of Tottenham was appointed colonel with William Northey as lieutenant-colonel. The 10 companies were based at:

- Bedwyn
- Devizes
- Salisbury
- Swindon
- Warminster
- Hindon
- Bradford-on-Avon
- Wilton
- Chippenham
- Malmesbury

The regiment was embodied for permanent service on 21 June 1759. Major Young, a former colonel of colonial militia, complained about the lack of standard training among the militia: he argued that the regular army had a new drill book and the Wiltshire Militia should adopt that, rather than devise its own, as some militia regiments were doing.

The regiment served in Southern England throughout its embodiment. By September the regiment was in camp, and Wiltshire landowner William Beckford complained to the government that a man a day was falling sick as the weather deteriorated. The regiment was part of a militia camp formed at Winchester in June 1760, and under the command of Lt-Col Northey it guarded French prisoners of war at Charles II's abandoned palace at Winchester (later Peninsula Barracks). The regiment sought to avoid being stationed at Hilsea Barracks in Portsmouth, where the regiments lodged there the previous year had suffered severe casualties from Smallpox, Dysentery and Typhus.

With the Seven Years War drawing to an end, orders to disembody the militia were issued on 15 December 1762. Thereafter the regiment did its 28 days' peacetime training at Devizes nearly every year.

In 1770 Lord Bruce resigned, along with many of his officers, in protest at the Earl of Pembroke's decision to promote a junior officer to replace Lt-Col Northey, who had recently died. The Earl then appointed himself as colonel, and held the command until 1778, during the American War of Independence, when the threat of invasion by the Americans' French and Spanish allies led to the embodiment of the militia on 31 March. Pembroke's kinsman, Henry Herbert, MP, soon to be created Lord Porchester, then took over the colonelcy on 27 March.

Several militia colonels had their men inoculated against smallpox during 1779, but this required them to be isolated for three weeks. The Corporation of Devizes objected to the regiment setting up an isolation hospital nearby and the regiment was prevented from hiring a house for the purpose.

During this embodiment the regiment served mostly in Lancashire, Yorkshire, and as far north as Berwick upon Tweed, until it was stood down in 1783.

From 1784 to 1792 the militia were supposed to assemble for 28 days' annual training, even though to save money only two-thirds of the men were called out each year. In 1786 the number of permanent non-commissioned officers (NCOs) was reduced. Colonel Lord Porchester was created Earl of Carnarvon in 1793.

=== French Revolutionary War ===
The militia had already been called out before Revolutionary France declared war on Britain on 1 February 1793. By 8 August 1793 the Wiltshire Militia was distributed across southern England, at Hastings, Winchester (2 companies), Rye (1 company), Dungeness (1 company), Hythe, Folkestone (1 company), Dover Town (1 company) and Hythe Battery.

The French Revolutionary Wars saw a new phase for the English militia: they were embodied for a whole generation, and became regiments of full-time professional soldiers (though restricted to service in the British Isles), which the regular Army increasingly saw as a prime source of recruits. They served in coast defences, manning garrisons, guarding prisoners of war, and carried out internal security duty, while their traditional local defence duties were taken over by the Volunteers and mounted Yeomanry.

For most of this embodiment the regiment served in Kent, Sussex and Devonshire, once being employed to suppress an insurrection in Exeter. In July 1795 it was in camp at Danbury, Essex, under Major-General Morshead. The outbreak of the Irish Rebellion of 1798 led to legislation that allowed English militia regiments to volunteer for service there, and the Wiltshires were one of those that did so.

=== Supplementary Militia ===
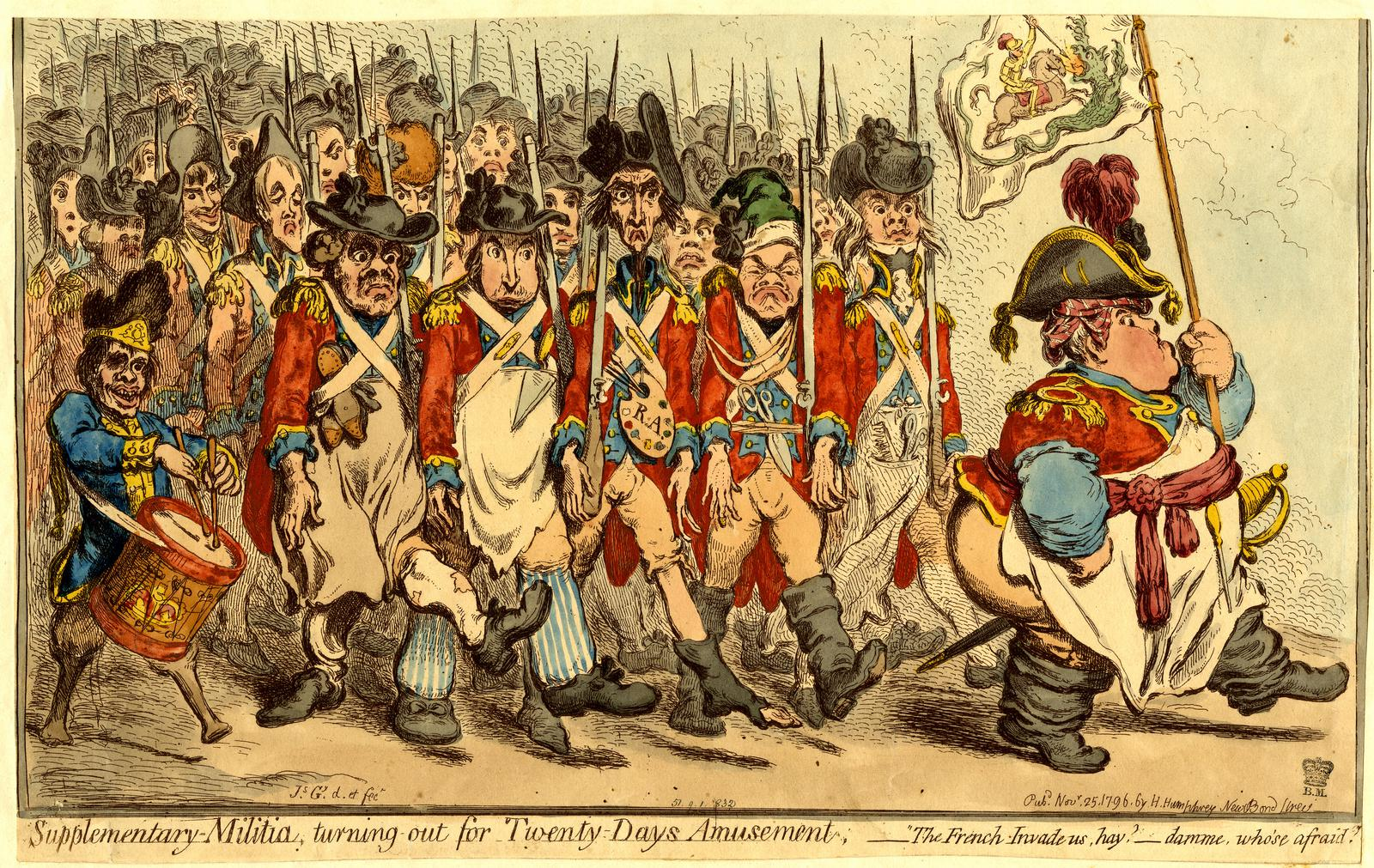
Supplementary-Militia, turning-out for Twenty Days Amusement: 1796 caricature by James Gillray

In an attempt to have as many men as possible under arms for home defence in order to release regulars, the Government created the Supplementary Militia in 1796, a compulsory levy of men to be trained in their spare time, and to be incorporated in the Militia in emergency. Wiltshire's additional quota was fixed at 1049 men. The lieutenancies were required to carry out 20 days' initial training as soon as possible. The Wiltshire Regiment of Supplementary Militia was embodied at Salisbury in 1797 under the command of the Duke of Somerset as colonel and Sir William à Court, 1st Baronet, as lieutenant-colonel. The regiment served at Winchester and in South Devon. However, the invasion threat having passed, the supplementary militia was disbanded in 1799, the discharged men being encouraged to volunteer for the regular army. The 62nd (Wiltshire) Regiment of Foot was stationed at Poole at the time and was raising a second battalion; many of the Wiltshire supplementaries volunteered for that unit.

=== Napoleonic Wars ===
The Treaty of Amiens led to the regular militia being disembodied in 1802. However, the Peace of Amiens was short-lived and Britain declared war on France once more on 18 May 1803. The Wiltshire Militia had already been embodied at Marlborough in April as two regiments, the 2nd being raised by ballot, the commanding officer (CO), Col James Dawkins and many of the officers being carried over from the Supplementaries. (Note: The London Gazette continued to refer to it as the Wiltshire Supplementary Militia.) The 2nd Wiltshires served in Somerset, the Isle of Wight and Weymouth, Dorset, before being disbanded in 1805.

In June 1804 the 1st Wiltshires joined a militia camp at Aylesbeare in Devon under Brigadier-General Gore. During August the regiments in camp participated in a 'flying camp' to Hembury Fort near Honiton.

During the summer of 1805, when Napoleon was massing his 'Army of England' at Boulogne for a projected invasion, the regiment was part of the Plymouth garrison. Its 957 men under Lt-Col Francis Warneford were deployed with 10 companies in Plymouth Dock Barracks and a detachment at Maker Heights Barracks.

By now most of the militiamen were substitutes rather than balloted men: in 1809 the Wiltshires had 50 volunteers, 104 balloted men and 619 substitutes. Those balloted could pay a £10 bounty for a substitute or a smaller annual subscription to the Western Militia Society, with offices in the county's main towns, which guaranteed to find a substitute. Large numbers of trained militiamen then took an additional bounty to transfer to the regular army at a later date.

Charles Brudenell-Bruce, 1st Marquess of Ailesbury, son of the regiment's former colonel, Lord Bruce, took over the command in 1811.

=== Wiltshire Local Militia ===
While the Regular Militia were the mainstay of national defence during the Napoleonic Wars, they were supplemented from 1808 by the Local Militia, which were part-time and only to be used within their own districts. These were raised to counter the declining numbers of Volunteers, and if their ranks could not be filled voluntarily the militia ballot was employed. The various units of Wiltshire Volunteers were disbanded and incorporated into five regiments of Local Militia:

- 1st Wiltshire Local Militia, Salisbury
- 2nd Wiltshire Local Militia, Devizes, Lt-Col Commandant Thomas Grimston Estcourt, formerly of the Loyal Devizes Volunteers, appointed 24 September 1808
- 3rd Wiltshire Local Militia, Marlborough, Lt-Col J.H. Penruddocke, formerly of the West Wiltshire Volunteers
- 4th Wiltshire Local Militia, Chippenham, Lt-Col Commandant Robert Humphreys and Lt-Col Paul Methuen, both of the former Chippenham, Corsham and Box Volunteers, appointed 24 September 1808
- 5th Wiltshire Local Militia, Warminster

At the annual training at Devizes in 1810, there was a mutiny in the 2nd Wiltshire Local Militia after the CO put a sergeant in the guardroom. The ringleaders persuaded many of the men that they were too harshly disciplined, and they broke the sergeant out after evening parade. The mutineers then attempted to force their way into the Bear Inn where many of the officers were staying, but were prevented by the Light Company, which remained loyal. The Wiltshire Yeomanry were also in town, and after being called out by the mayor they quickly quelled the mutiny. The ringleaders were tried on Devizes Green and punished.

=== Ireland and France ===
From November 1813 the regular militia were invited to volunteer for limited overseas service, primarily for garrison duties in Europe. A contingent of four officers and 130 other ranks from the Wiltshire Militia joined the 2nd Provisional Battalion, assembling at Chelmsford under the command of Lt-Col Bayly of the Royal West Middlesex Militia. It then marched to Portsmouth where the Militia Brigade embarked on 10 March 1814 and joined the Earl of Dalhousie's division that had occupied Bordeaux just as the war was ending. The brigade did not form part of the Army of Occupation after the abdication of Napoleon and returned to England in June.

The Interchange Act 1811 allowed English militia regiments to serve in Ireland (and vice versa) for two years. The rest of the Wiltshire Militia embarked for this service on 24 March 1814. It returned in 1816, by which time the war had been ended by the Battle of Waterloo. The Wiltshire Militia was disembodied after more than two decades of almost continuous service.

=== Long Peace ===
After Waterloo there was another long peace. Although officers continued to be commissioned into the militia and ballots were still held, the regiments were rarely assembled for training. The permanent staff of the Wiltshires were housed in Marlborough, probably through the influence of the Marquess of Ailesbury who lived nearby at Tottenham House. He paid for the old Corn Exchange in the High Street to be converted into a militia headquarters and stores. The regiment mustered for training at Marlborough in 1820, 1821 and 1825, but not again until 1831, the last time the Militia Ballot was employed. In 1835, in common with other militia regiments, the Wiltshires returned all their weapons to Ordnance Stores except those of the permanent staff, which had been reduced to an adjutant, sergeant-major, 12 sergeants and 6 drummers. Vacancies were filled by able-bodied Chelsea out-pensioners from the district. The NCOs lived in Militia Court off Marlborough High Street.

The Marquess of Ailesbury stepped down from the colonelcy in 1827 and was replaced by Thomas Howard, 16th Earl of Suffolk. He resigned in 1840 and Sir John Cam Hobhouse, 2nd Baronet (later Lord Broughton), MP, became colonel of the regiment on 13 February 1840. The regiment was redesignated the Royal Wiltshire Militia on 29 June 1841, said to be in recognition of its part at the Battle of Sedgemoor.

== 1852 reforms ==
The Militia of the United Kingdom was revived by the Militia Act 1852, enacted during a renewed period of international tension. As before, units were raised and administered on a county basis, and filled by voluntary enlistment (although conscription by means of the Militia Ballot might be used if the counties failed to meet their quotas). Training was for 56 days on enlistment, then for 21–28 days per year, during which the men received full army pay. Under the Act, Militia units could be embodied by Royal Proclamation for full-time home defence service in three circumstances:

1. 'Whenever a state of war exists between Her Majesty and any foreign power'
2. 'In all cases of invasion or upon imminent danger thereof'
3. 'In all cases of rebellion or insurrection'

The Royal Wiltshire Militia was reformed, with its headquarters at Devizes once more. Lord Broughton remained colonel, with command exercised by Lt-Col Frederick, 2nd Lord Methuen (appointed in 1846).

=== Crimean War and Indian Mutiny ===
War having broken out with Russia in 1854 and an expeditionary force sent to the Crimea, the militia were called out for home defence. The Royal Wiltshire was embodied on 10 June 1854 and borrowed NCOs from the Coldstream Guards to drill the farm boys and shepherds who gathered in Devizes. Initial drill was carried out on a hired field near Devizes wharf, regimental HQ and the armoury were in the Bear Inn, and the officers' mess was in the Golden Lion. Once the 1100-strong regiment had been clothed, equipped and drilled, it marched to Clarence Barracks, Portsmouth, for training.

The regiment volunteered for overseas garrison duty and three-quarters was sent to the Mediterranean in 1855, the remainder staying in Devizes. The service companies, each 90 strong, sailed in the iron screw ship Croesus, to be stationed at Corfu and Zante in the Ionian Islands. The duty was uneventful, but the regiment suffered from cholera. The regiment returned to Portsmouth and thence to Wiltshire in early 1856. It was disembodied on 17 September 1856. For this service it was awarded the Battle honour Mediterranean.

The Royal Wiltshires were called out again for garrison duty when much of the army was sent to quell the Indian Mutiny. They served at Aldershot, Gosport and Dover until they were disembodied in 1860. During this period new Militia Barracks were built in Devizes, between the Bath Road and Devizes Prison. Staff quarters were added in 1863 across the road near St Peter's Church. The Militia Reserve introduced in 1867 consisted of present and former militiamen who undertook to serve overseas in case of war.

== Cardwell and Childers reforms ==
Under the 'Localisation of the Forces' scheme introduced by the Cardwell Reforms, regular infantry battalions were linked together and assigned to particular counties or localities, while the county Militia and Volunteers were affiliated to them in a 'sub-district' with a shared depot. Sub-District No 38 (County of Wilts) comprised:

- 62nd (Wiltshire) Regiment of Foot
- 99th (Lanarkshire) Regiment of Foot
- Royal Wiltshire Militia at Devizes
- 1st Administrative Battalion, Wiltshire Rifle Volunteer Corps at Salisbury
- 2nd Administrative Battalion, Wiltshire Rifle Volunteer Corps at Chippenham

In April 1873 the depot was established at Devizes, where Le Marchant Barracks was opened in 1878. The existing Militia Barracks were transferred to Wiltshire Constabulary in 1880, but the militia stores remained at Devizes Town Hall until 1892. During annual training the militia camped outside Le Marchant Barracks. A second militia battalion was to have been formed in the sub-district, but this was never done. Militia battalions now came under the War Office rather than their lords lieutenant. They had a large cadre of permanent staff (about 30) and a number of the officers were former Regulars. Around a third of the recruits and many young officers went on to join the regular Army.

Following the Cardwell Reforms, a mobilisation scheme began to appear in the Army List from December 1875. This assigned Regular and Militia units to places in an order of battle of corps, divisions and brigades for the 'Active Army', even though these formations were entirely theoretical, with no staff or services assigned. The Royal Wiltshire Militia were assigned to 2nd Brigade of 2nd Division, V Corps. The division would have mustered at Warminster in Wiltshire in time of war.

=== 3rd Battalion, Wiltshire Regiment ===
The 1881 Childers Reforms took Cardwell's scheme a stage further, the linked regular regiments combining into single two-battalion regiments, with their associated militia and volunteers. On 1 July 1881 the regiments in Wiltshire became the Wiltshire Regiment (Duke of Edinburgh's):

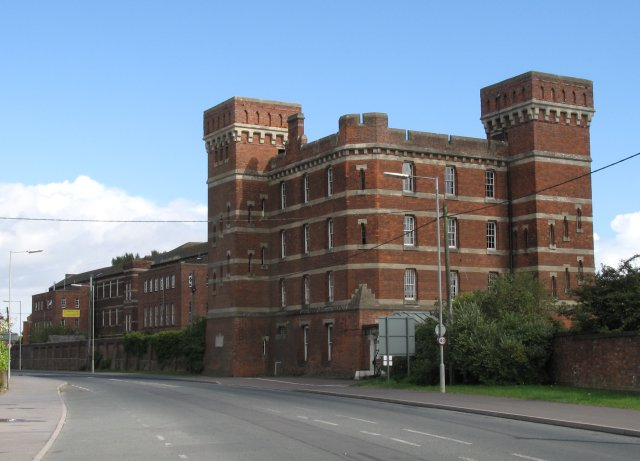
Le Marchant Barracks, Devizes, in 2005

- 1st Battalion (ex-62nd Foot)
- 2nd Battalion (ex-99th Foot)
- 3rd (Royal Wiltshire Militia) Battalion
- 62nd Regimental Depot
- 1st Volunteer Battalion
- 2nd Volunteer Battalion

=== Second Boer War ===
When the bulk of the Regular Army was sent to South Africa at the outbreak of the Second Boer War, the Militia Reserve was called out as reinforcements, followed by the militia battalions for home defence. The 3rd Wiltshires were embodied on 16 January 1900 under the command of Lt-Col Edward Sanford.

After serving at Cork the battalion volunteered for overseas service and was stationed on St Helena to guard Boer prisoners of war held there. It suffered badly from an outbreak of enteric fever, and 13 other ranks died. It returned to the UK and was disembodied on 11 September 1902. The 3rd Wiltshires were awarded the battle honour "St Helena 1901–2" and the participants received the Queen's South Africa Medal.

== Special Reserve ==
After the Boer War, the future of the militia was called into question. There were moves to reform the Auxiliary Forces (Militia, Yeomanry and Volunteers) to take their place in the six Army Corps proposed by the Secretary of State for War, St John Brodrick. However, little of Brodrick's scheme was carried out. Under the more sweeping Haldane Reforms of 1908, the Militia was replaced by the Special Reserve (SR), a semi-professional force whose role was to provide reinforcement drafts for regular units serving overseas in wartime, rather like the earlier Militia Reserve. The battalion became the 3rd (Reserve) Battalion, Wiltshire Regiment, on 14 June 1908.

=== 3rd (Reserve) Battalion ===
On the outbreak of World War I on 4 August 1914 the battalion was embodied under the command of Lt-Col Leonard, 4th Lord Heytesbury, and went to its war station at Weymouth, where it formed part of the garrison for the Portland Naval Base. Here it carried out its twin roles of coast defence and training reinforcements for the regular battalions of the regiment serving on the Western Front. At first the battalion was billeted on the inhabitants of the town, but by early 1915 it was in camp on Lodmoor. In April 1915 it moved inland to Dorchester, but by July it was back at Weymouth. By September 1917 the invasion threat was judged to be most critical in Eastern England and the 3rd (R) Bn moved to Sittingbourne in Kent, where it joined the Sittingbourne SR Brigade in the Thames and Medway garrison. It remained there for the rest of the war, during which the battalion had sent 622 officers and 13,486 other ranks to join the Wiltshires overseas.

After the Armistice with Germany, the Irish Independence crisis drew large numbers of reserve units to Ireland in early 1919. The 3rd (R) Bn Wiltshires moved there in March and served for eight months in Dublin under the command of Lt-Col Lionel Spiller. They were then relieved by the Regular 1st Bn, transferring their remaining personnel to that battalion on 27 September and finally being disembodied on 13 November 1919.

=== 8th (Reserve) Battalion ===
After Lord Kitchener issued his call for volunteers in August 1914, the battalions of the 1st, 2nd and 3rd New Armies ('K1', 'K2' and 'K3' of 'Kitchener's Army') were quickly formed at the regimental depots. The SR battalions also swelled with new recruits and were soon well above their establishment strength. On 8 October 1914 each SR battalion was ordered to use the surplus to form a service battalion of the 4th New Army ('K4'). Accordingly, the 3rd (Reserve) Bn at Weymouth formed the 8th (Service) Bn, Wiltshire Regiment on 7 November, becoming part of 102nd Brigade in 34th Division. Colonel Lord John Joicey-Cecil, former CO of a militia battalion of the Lincolnshire Regiment, was appointed CO of the battalion on 1 January 1915. By February 1915 the battalion was at Trowbridge. In the spring of 1915 the War Office decided to convert the K4 battalions into 2nd Reserve units, providing drafts for the K1–K3 battalions in the same way that the SR was doing for the Regular battalions. On 10 April 1915 the Wiltshire battalion became 8th (Reserve) Battalion, and 102nd Brigade became 14th Reserve Brigade. However, in May the 8th Wiltshires returned to Dorset to join the 8th Reserve Brigade at Wareham, where it trained drafts for the 5th, 6th and 7th (Service) Bns of the regiment serving in Mesopotamia, on the Western Front and at Salonika. On 1 September 1916 the 2nd Reserve battalions were transferred to the Training Reserve (TR) and the battalion was disbanded and distributed among the other TR battalions remaining in 8th Reserve Bde at Wareham.

=== Postwar ===
The disembodied SR resumed its old title of Militia in 1921 but like most militia units the 3rd Wiltshires remained in abeyance after World War I. By the outbreak of World War II in 1939, no officers remained listed for the battalion. The Militia was formally disbanded in April 1953.

== Commanders ==
=== Colonels ===
The following served as Colonel of the Regiment:

- Thomas Brudenell-Bruce, Lord Bruce of Tottenham, 1758–70
- Henry Herbert, 10th Earl of Pembroke, 1770–78
- Henry Herbert, 1st Earl of Carnarvon, 1778–1811
- James Dawkins, 2nd Wiltshire Militia 1804–5
- Charles Brudenell-Bruce, 1st Marquess of Ailesbury (son of Lord Bruce), 1811–27
- Thomas Howard, 16th Earl of Suffolk, 1827–40
- John Hobhouse, 1st Lord Broughton from 1840; later Hon Col

Following the 1852 Militia Act no more colonels were appointed in the militia and the lieutenant-colonel became the commanding officer (CO); at the same time, the position of Honorary Colonel was introduced.

=== Lieutenant-Colonels ===
Lieutenant-Colonels of the regiment (commanding officers after 1859) included the following:

- William Northey, appointed 1758, died 1770
- Henry Herbert of Christian Malford, ca 1772–1778
- Henry Chivers Vince of Lavington, ca 1778–88
- G. Montagu, Lt-Col in the Army 1771, promoted from Major in the regiment ca 1789–93
- Francis Warneford of Warneford Place, appointed 3 June 1794 until 1836
- James, Viscount Fitzharris, 2nd Wiltshire Militia 1804–5
- Lt-Col Villet, 1836–46
- Frederick Methuen, 2nd Baron Methuen, formerly 71st Foot, appointed 5 May 1846, Lt-Col Commandant 9 January 1859; later Hon Col
- Charles Coddington, promoted 18 May 1889
- Edward Sanford, promoted 4 April 1894
- Reginald Barclay, promoted 21 March 1903
- Lord Heytesbury, retired Regular Major, promoted 21 March 1914
- Lionel Spiller, promoted 21 March 1919
- Lord John Joicey-Cecil, retired Militia Colonel, appointed to 8th Bn from 1 January 1915 to disbandment

=== Honorary Colonels ===
The following served as Honorary Colonel of the regiment:

- John Hobhouse, 1st Lord Broughton, former CO, appointed 9 January 1859; died 3 June 1869
- Frederick, 2nd Lord Methuen, former CO, appointed 5 December 1885, died 26 September 1891
- Field Marshal Paul, 3rd Lord Methuen, appointed 5 June 1892; reappointed to SR battalion 14 June 1908

== Heritage and ceremonial ==
=== Uniforms and insignia ===
Although the Wiltshire Militia regiments of the Restoration period were known by colours (the 'Red Regiment', 'Blue Regiment' etc), these could refer to their uniform coats, facings, or flags, and the actual uniforms are unrecorded. From at least 1778, the Wiltshire Militia wore red coats with yellow facings. The Wiltshire Supplementary Militia/2nd Wiltshire Militia (known as the Yellow Regiment) also wore red with yellow facings. The facings changed to blue when the Wiltshire Militia was given the Royal title in 1841.

The buttons worn ca 1770–90 had 'WILTS' within a wreath; a pattern worn c.1778–1811 had a Wyvern facing right, with 'WM' beneath and the motto 'UNG JE SERVIRAY' above (the wyvern crest and motto deriving from the coat of arms of the Earls of Carnarvon). The ORs' button c.1800–1830 had a crown over 'WILTSHIRE'. From c.1830 until 1881 the buttons carried the royal cypher above the name of the regiment. Prior to 1855 the officers' shoulder-belt plate bore an eight-pointed cut star with a crown and garter in its centre; below the garter was a scroll inscribed 'WILTSHIRE'.

Up to 1869, the officers' badge was St George's Cross within a garter inscribed 'WILTSHIRE' and a wreath of oak leaves. From 1874 to 1881 the ORs' Glengarry cap badge was a crowned garter inscribed with its motto with St George's Cross at the centre, while the forage cap badge was a Maltese cross in the centre of which was St George's Cross within a garter inscribed 'ROYAL WILTS MILITIA', with the honour 'Mediterranean' on the top limb of the Maltese cross. The Maltese cross was derived from the badge of the affiliated 62nd Foot. The collar badge was a castle, probably signifying that of Devizes, the regimental depot.

In 1881 the battalion adopted the uniform and insignia of the Wiltshire Regiment, including the white facings of an English county regiment instead of the blue of a royal regiment, with the addition of the letter 'M' on the shoulder-strap.

The Wiltshire Militia were presented with colours in 1763; the regimental colour would have been the same colour as the facings. The regimental colour of the Wiltshire Supplementary Militia was yellow and its colours were taken over by the 2nd Wiltshire Militia; these were laid up in Salisbury Cathedral when the regiment was disbanded in 1805. New colours were presented in 1853, when the regimental colour was blue, as appropriate to a royal regiment. The colours of the 3rd (R) Bn Wiltshires, presented in 1913, were laid up in St James's Church, Devizes, on 23 November 1858.

=== Precedence ===
In the Seven Years' War, militia regiments camped together took precedence according to the order in which they had arrived. During the War of American Independence, the counties were given an order of precedence determined by ballot each year. For the Wiltshire Militia the positions were:

- 19th on 1 June 1778
- 38th on12 May 1779
- 22nd on 6 May 1780
- 37th on 28 April 1781
- 9th on 7 May 1782

The militia order of precedence balloted for in 1793 (Wiltshire was 35th) remained in force throughout the French Revolutionary War. Another ballot for precedence took place at the start of the Napoleonic War, when Wiltshire was 8th.This order continued until 1833. In that year the King drew the lots for individual regiments and the resulting list remained in force with minor amendments until the end of the militia. The regiments raised before the peace of 1763 took the first 47 places: the Wiltshire was 33rd, although most regiments paid little notice to the additional number.

=== Battle honours ===
The regiment's colours bore the following battle honours awarded for its overseas service in the Crimean and Second Boer Wars.

- Mediterranean
- St Helena 1901–02

These were rescinded in 1910 when the SR battalions assumed the same honours as their parent regiments.

== See also ==
- Trained Bands
- Militia (English)
- Militia (Great Britain)
- Militia (United Kingdom)
- Special Reserve
- Wiltshire Regiment

== Bibliography ==
- W. Y. Baldry, 'Order of Precedence of Militia Regiments', Journal of the Society for Army Historical Research, Vol 15, No 57 (Spring 1936), pp. 5–16. JSTOR 44227944.
- Maj A.F. Becke,History of the Great War: Order of Battle of Divisions, Part 3b: New Army Divisions (30–41) and 63rd (R.N.) Division, London: HM Stationery Office, 1939/Uckfield: Naval & Military Press, 2007, ISBN 1-84734-741-X.
- Beckett, Ian F. W. (2011). Britain's Part Time Soldiers. The Amateur Military Tradition 1558—1945 (2 ed.). Barnsley: Pen & Sword. ISBN 978-1-84884-395-0.
- Lindsay Boynton, The Elizabethan Militia 1558–1638, London: Routledge & Keegan Paul, 1967.
- Steve Brown, 'Home Guard: The Forces to Meet the Expected French Invasion/1 September 1805' at The Napoleon Series (archived at the Wayback Machine).
- Lt-Col Sir John M. Burgoyne, Bart, Regimental Records of the Bedfordshire Militia 1759–1884, London: W.H. Allen, 1884.
- Burke's Peerage, Baronetage and Knightage, 100th Edn, London, 1953.
- David G. Chandler, Sedgemoor 1685: An Account and an Anthology, London: Anthony Mott, 1985, ISBN 0-907746-43-8.
- C.G. Cruickshank, Elizabeth's Army, 2nd Edn, Oxford: Oxford University Press, 1966.
- Capt John Davis, Historical Records of the Second Royal Surrey or Eleventh Regiment of Militia, London: Marcus Ward, 1877.
- Col John K. Dunlop, The Development of the British Army 1899–1914, London: Methuen, 1938.
- Mark Charles Fissel, The Bishops' Wars: Charles I's campaigns against Scotland 1638–1640, Cambridge: Cambridge University Press, 1994, ISBN 0-521-34520-0.
- Sir John Fortescue, A History of the British Army, Vol I, 2nd Edn, London: Macmillan, 1910.
- Sir John Fortescue, A History of the British Army, Vol II, London: Macmillan, 1899.
- Sir John Fortescue, A History of the British Army, Vol III, 2nd Edn, London: Macmillan, 1911.
- Sir John Fortescue, A History of the British Army, Vol VI, London: Macmillan, 1910.
- Sir John Fortescue, A History of the British Army, Vol VII, 1809–1810, London: Macmillan, 1912.
- J.B.M. Frederick, Lineage Book of British Land Forces 1660–1978, Vol I, Wakefield: Microform Academic, 1984, ISBN 1-85117-007-3.
- Col George Jackson Hay, An Epitomized History of the Militia (The Constitutional Force), London: United Service Gazette, 1905/Ray Westlake Military Books, 1987, ISBN 0-9508530-7-0/Uckfield: Naval & Military Press, 2015 ISBN 978-1-78331-171-2.
- Richard Holmes, Soldiers: Army Lives and Loyalties from Redcoats to Dusty Warriors, London: HarperPress, 2011, ISBN 978-0-00-722570-5.
- Brig E.A. James, British Regiments 1914–18, London: Samson Books, 1978, ISBN 0-906304-03-2/Uckfield: Naval & Military Press, 2001, ISBN 978-1-84342-197-9.
- Col N.C.E. Kenrick, The Story of the Wiltshire Regiment (Duke of Edinburgh's): The 62nd and 99th Foot (1756–1959), the Militia and the Territorials, the Service Battalions and all those others who have served or been affiliated with the Moonrakers, Aldershot: Gale & Polden, 1963
- Roger Knight, Britain Against Napoleon: The Organization of Victory 1793–1815, London: Allen Lane, 2013/Penguin, 2014, ISBN 978-0-14-103894-0.
- N.B. Leslie, Battle Honours of the British and Indian Armies 1695–1914, London: Leo Cooper, 1970, ISBN 0-85052-004-5.
- John E. Morris, The Welsh Wars of Edward I, Oxford: Clarendon Press, 1901 (1968 reprint).
- Sir Charles Oman,A History of the Peninsular War, Vol VII, August 1813 to April 14, 1814, Oxford: Clarendon Press, 1930/London: Greenhill Books, 1997, ISBN 1-85367-227-0.
- H. G. Parkyn, 'English Militia Regiments 1757–1935: Their Badges and Buttons', Journal of the Society for Army Historical Research, Vol 15, No 60 (Winter 1936), pp. 216–248.] JSTOR 442196788.
- Capt B. E. Sargeaunt, The Royal Monmouthshire Militia, London: RUSI, 1910/Uckfield: Naval & Military Press, ISBN 978-1-78331-204-7.
- Christopher L. Scott, The military effectiveness of the West Country Militia at the time of the Monmouth Rebellion, Cranfield University PhD thesis 2011.
- Arthur Sleigh, The Royal Militia and Yeomanry Cavalry Army List, April 1850, London: British Army Despatch Press, 1850/Uckfield: Naval and Military Press, 1991, ISBN 978-1-84342-410-9.
- Edward M. Spiers, The Army and Society 1815–1914, London: Longmans, 1980, ISBN 0-582-48565-7.
- Peter Traquair, Freedom's Sword: Scotland's Wars of Independence, London; HarperCollins, 1998, ISBN, 0-00-472080-6.
- War Office, A List of the Officers of the Militia, the Gentlemen & Yeomanry Cavalry, and Volunteer Infantry of the United Kingdom, 11th Edn, London: War Office, 14 October 1805/Uckfield: Naval and Military Press, 2005, ISBN 978-1-84574-207-2.
- J.R. Western, The English Militia in the Eighteenth Century: The Story of a Political Issue 1660–1802, London: Routledge & Kegan Paul, 1965.

=== External sources ===
- Chris Baker, The Long, Long Trail
- British Military Buttons.
- Peter Hodgkinson, Infantry Battalion Commanding Officers of the British Armies in the First World War (archived at the Wayback Machine).
- History of Parliament Online
- T.F. Mills, Land Forces of Britain, the Empire and Commonwealth – Regiments.org (archived at the Wayback Machine)
- David Plant, British Civil Wars, Commonwealth & Protectorate, 1638–1660 (The BCW Project).
