= Old Town Hall, Westbury =

Municipal building in Westbury, Wiltshire, England

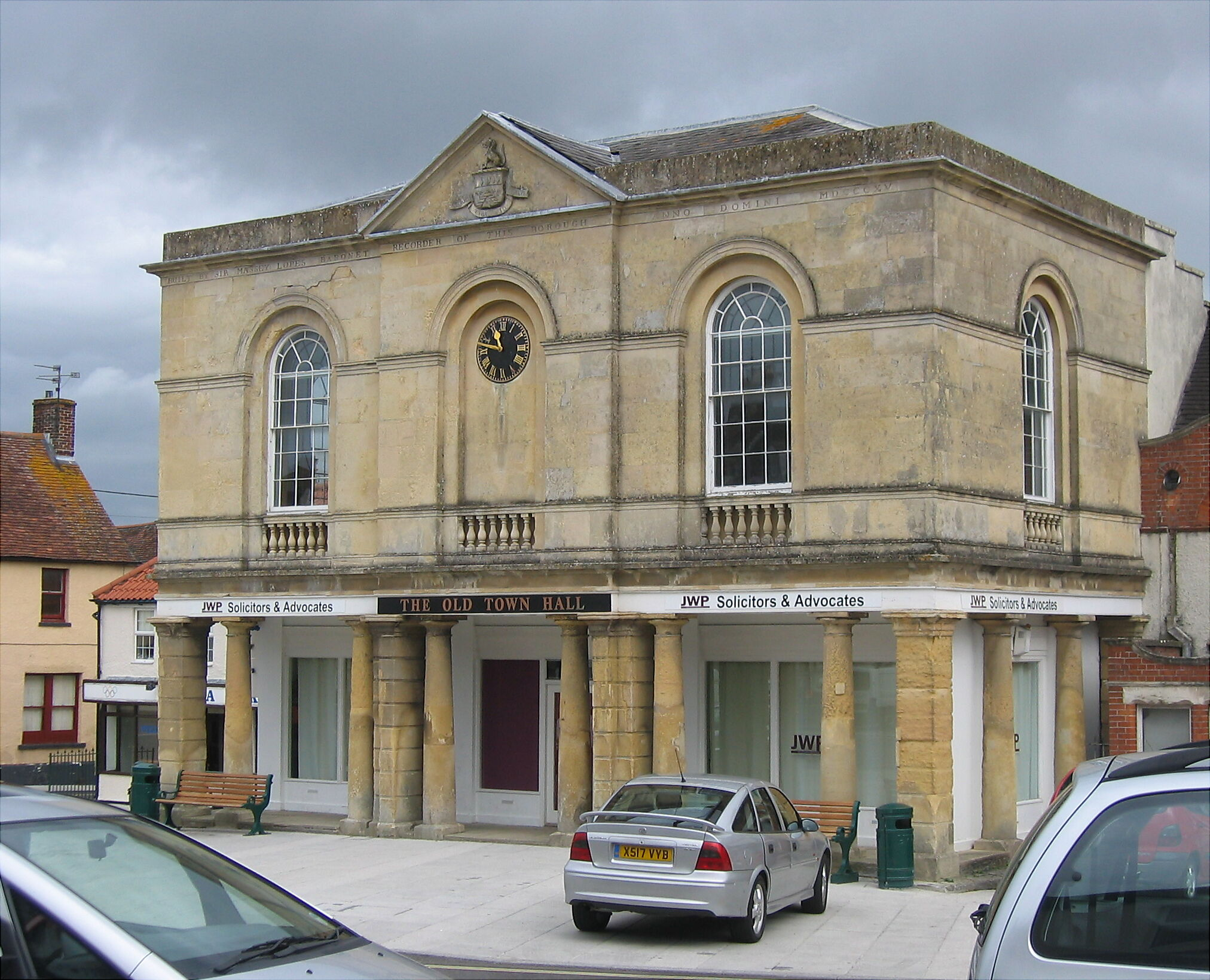

- Shown in Wiltshire
- 51.2627°N 2.1821°W
- Location: Market Place, Westbury

History
- Built: 1815

Site notes
- Architectural style: Neoclassical style

Listed Building – Grade II*
- Official name: The Town Hall
- Designated: 29 December 1950
- Reference no.: 1036308

The Old Town Hall is a municipal building in the Market Place in Westbury, Wiltshire, England. The structure, which was used as the local market hall and as a courtroom, is a Grade II* listed building.

== History ==
The town hall was a gift to the town from Sir Manasseh Masseh Lopes who had acquired the manor of Westbury from the Earl of Abingdon and, with it, the pocket borough of Westbury in 1810. The building was designed in the neoclassical style, was built in ashlar stone and was completed in 1815. The design involved a symmetrical main frontage with three bays facing onto the Market Place; it was arcaded on the ground floor, so that markets could be held, with an assembly room on the first floor. Each bay contained two Doric order columns which supported a wooden entablature. On the first floor, the central bay, which slightly projected forward, featured a blind alcove containing a clock; the other bays contained round headed sash windows. At roof level there was a frieze inscribed with the words "Built by Sir Massey Lopes Baronet, Recorder of this Borough, Anno Domini MDCCCXV" as well as a central pediment with the Lopes coat of arms in the tympanum. A small lock-up for petty criminals was established on the ground floor but was demolished by 1835.

In the 19th century, the building was used as a market hall, as a place for civic meetings and as a venue for the county court hearings. A Russian gun which had been captured during the Crimean War was placed outside the town hall in the second half of the 19th century. The borough council was abolished under the Municipal Corporations Act 1883.

Following significant population growth, largely associated with Westbury's status as a market town, the area became an urban district in 1899. However, the new council decided that the old town hall was inadequate for its meetings and instead chose to use the Laverton Institute in Bratton Road as its meeting place. The old town hall continued to be used as a courthouse into the 20th century but by the 1960s the first floor was only being used as a branch of the county library.

An extensive programme of refurbishment works, which involved converting the building for commercial use and filling in the ground floor area to create shops, was completed in 1973. The building was subsequently occupied by a firm of estate agents until a South African restaurant opened in the building in 2004; it was later taken over by a firm of solicitors.

== See also ==
- Grade II* listed buildings in Wiltshire (P–Z)
