= The Rifles Berkshire and Wiltshire Museum =

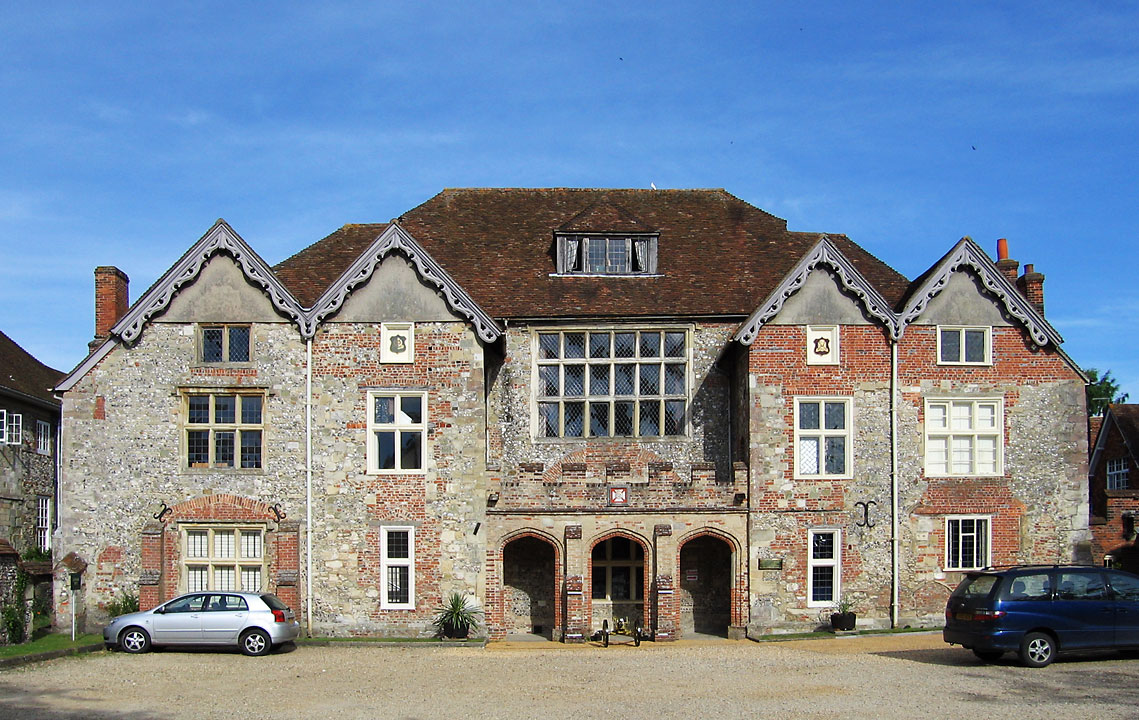
- The Wardrobe, Salisbury

- Shown in Wiltshire
- Established: 1982
- Location: The Close, Salisbury, England
- Coordinates: 51.0662°N 1.7996°W
- Type: Military Museum
- Website: www.thewardrobe.org.uk

The Rifles Berkshire and Wiltshire Museum is a military museum at The Close in Salisbury, England. It is housed in a Grade II* listed building known as The Wardrobe.

== History ==
=== The building ===
The original building on the site was constructed in 1254. It was rebuilt in the 15th century and was used to store the robes of the Bishop of Salisbury; hence it was known as the "Bishop's Wardrobe" or "The Wardrobe".

=== The collection ===
The museum combines the collections of the Royal Berkshire Regiment, which had a museum at Brock Barracks in Reading, and the Wiltshire Regiment, which had a museum at Le Marchant Barracks in Devizes. The trustees of the museum acquired "The Wardrobe" from the Dean and Chapter of Salisbury Cathedral in 1981 and the new museum was opened by the Duke of Edinburgh as the Duke of Edinburgh’s Royal Regiment Museum in July 1982. It was branded as "Redcoats in the Wardrobe" in 1991 and then became the Royal Gloucestershire, Berkshire and Wiltshire Regiment (Salisbury) Museum in 1994 and the Rifles (Berkshire and Wiltshire) Museum in 2007. It now has extensive artefacts relating to both the Royal Berkshire Regiment and the Wiltshire Regiment.

=== Refurbishment ===
The museum reopened after an 18-month refurbishment in April 2026.
