= Market Cross, Devizes =

Historic monument in Devizes, England

Coordinates: 51°21′09″N 1°59′44″W

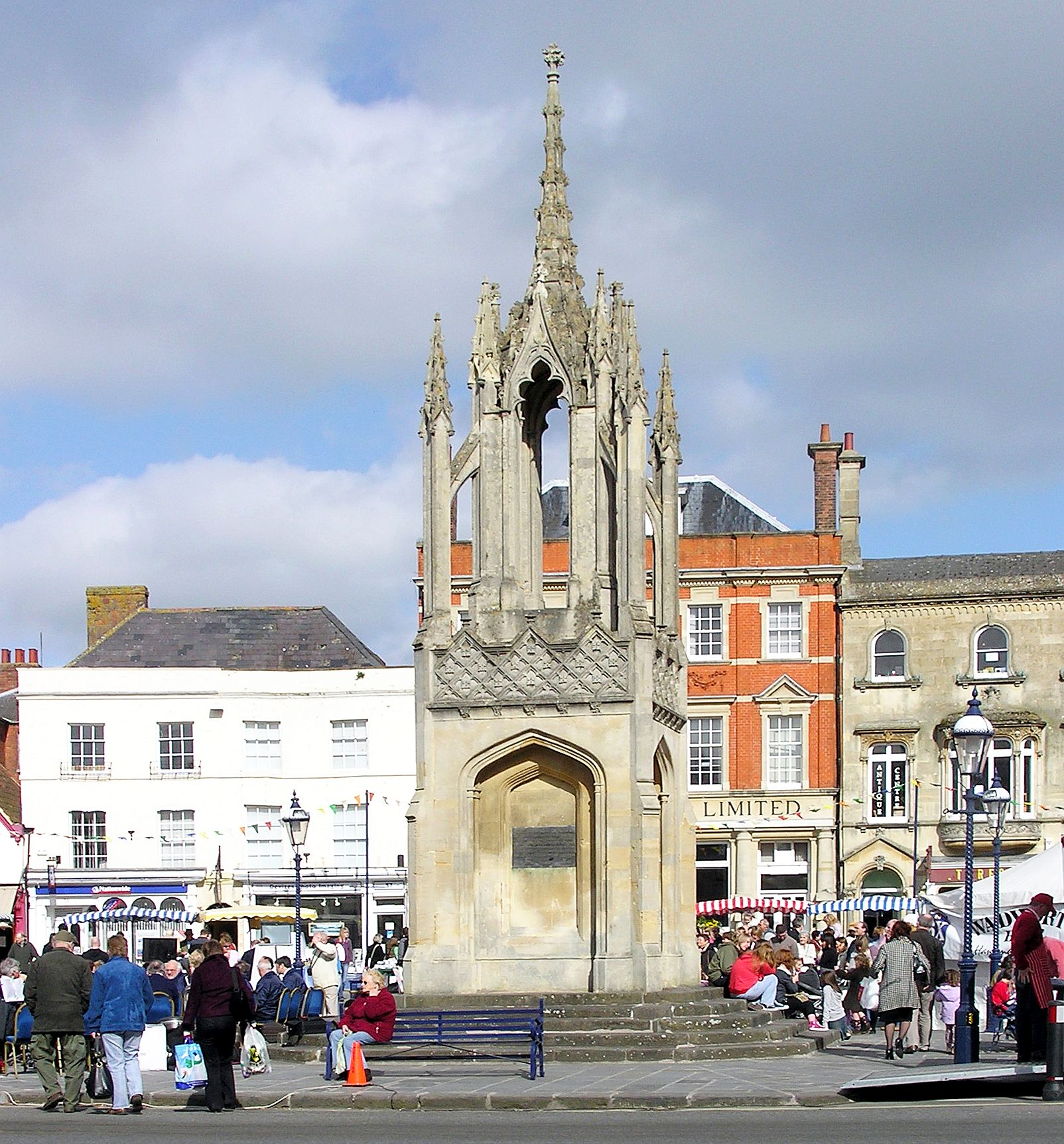
Market Cross, Devizes, in 2007

The Market Cross in Devizes, Wiltshire, England sits in Market Place at the centre of the town. It was constructed in 1814 on the site of an older cross. Designed by architect James Wyatt, it is Gothic in style. It was completed posthumously to his design, following Wyatt's death in a coach accident near Marlborough. His son Benjamin Wyatt is also credited as the architect, likely because he executed his father's design.

== Funding for construction ==
The monument was erected by the corporation of Devizes. It was paid for by Henry Addington, Viscount Sidmouth, a former Prime Minister then serving as Home Secretary, who had been a Member of Parliament for the town between 1784 and 1805 before his elevation to the House of Lords.

== Listed status ==
The cross has been granted Grade II* status and was first listed in 1954.

== Bibliography ==
- Dale, Antony. James Wyatt. B. Blackwell, 1956.
- Durman, Richard. Classical Buildings of Wiltshire & Bath: A Palladian Quest. Millstream, 2000.
