= Devizes Town Hall =

Municipal building in Devizes, Wiltshire, England

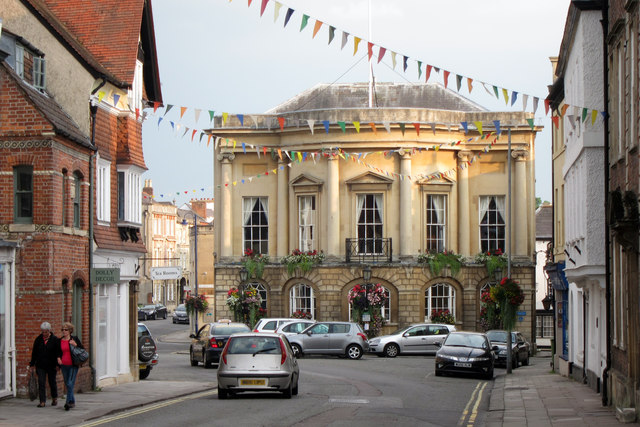
- The current town hall in St John's Street, completed in 1808

- Shown in Wiltshire
- 51.3510°N 1.9946°W
- Location: St John's Street, Devizes, Wiltshire, England

History
- Built: 1808

Site notes
- Architect: Thomas Baldwin
- Architectural style: Neoclassical style

Listed Building – Grade II*
- Official name: Town Hall
- Designated: 9 April 1954
- Reference no.: 1262331

Devizes Town Hall is a municipal building in St John's Street in Devizes, Wiltshire, England. The structure, which is the meeting place of Devizes Town Council, is a Grade II* listed building.

== History ==
=== Earlier municipal buildings ===
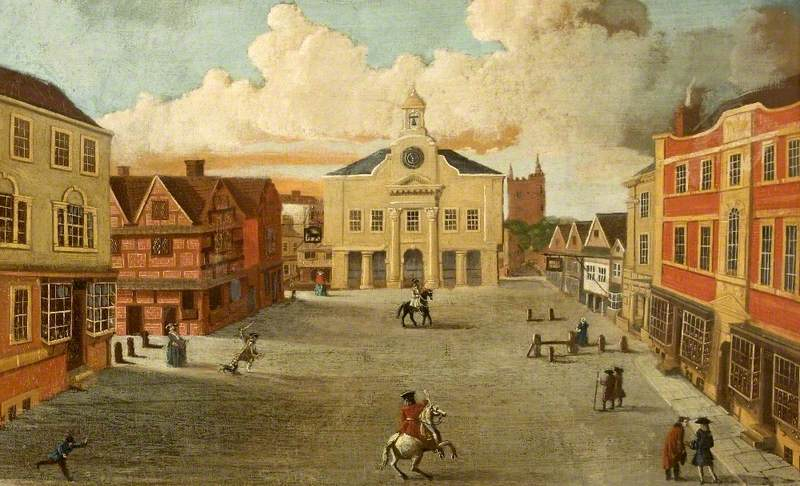
The Yarn Hall in St John's Street, completed in 1575

The first municipal building in Devizes was a medieval structure in the New Port area, a district inside the outer bailey of Devizes Castle, completed in the mid-15th century. A second structure, a guildhall with an adjoining council house, was completed in the mid-16th century: this structure accommodated the courts and also provided storage for the town's archives.

A third structure, a brick building in the centre of St John's Street known as the Yarn Hall, was completed 1575, rebuilt in 1616 and then remodelled in the neoclassical style in 1629. The design involved a symmetrical main frontage with five bays facing south down St John's Street; there was a colonnade with Tuscan order columns on the ground floor and the central bay featured a doorway which was flanked by full-height Corinthian order columns supporting a pediment. This structure, which also accommodated the courts, was further augmented when a lock-up was incorporated into the basement in 1650. The building became home to the cheese market in 1689 and was re-configured to accommodate a council chamber in 1735.

A fourth structure, an ashlar stone building on the south side of Wine Street now known as the Old Town Hall, was designed by a Mr Lawrence in the neoclassical style and was completed in 1752. The building was largely used as a market hall: between 1785 and 1787 it served as an arsenal for the Royal Wiltshire Militia and, while the current structure was under construction, it was very briefly used as a venue for council meetings. It was then let out for commercial use in 1809 and sold in 1825.

=== The current town hall ===
The current structure, an ashlar stone building in the centre of St John's Street, was built on the site of the old Yarn Hall and, although the old façade was completely demolished, the new work incorporated much of the interior of the old building. It was financed in part by donations from the local members of parliament, Joshua Smith and Thomas Estcourt. The new structure was designed by Thomas Baldwin in the neoclassical style, built in ashlar stone at a cost of £6,416 and was officially opened with a grand ball on 2 November 1808. The design involved a symmetrical main frontage with five bays facing south down St John's Street; the central section of three bays formed a full-height curved bow. The ground floor, which was rusticated, featured round headed windows, while the first floor featured pedimented sash windows flanked by Ionic order columns supporting an entablature. Internally, the ground floor continued to accommodate the cheese market while the first floor retained the council chamber and a large assembly room. The re-construction also preserved the lock-up in the basement.

After significant population growth, largely associated with the status of Devizes as a market town, the area became a municipal borough with the town hall as its headquarters in 1835. The basement of the building was used as an air raid shelter in the Second World War and, after the war, the assembly hall was used as an events venue: performers included the beat band, The Merseybeats, in June 1966 and the rock band, Status Quo, in December 1968. The building continued to serve as the headquarters of Devizes Borough Council for much of the 20th century but ceased to be the local seat of government after Kennet District Council was established at The Cedars in Bath Road in 1974. The town hall subsequently became the offices and meeting place of Devizes Town Council.

Works of art in the town hall include portraits by Joshua Reynolds of King George III and of Queen Charlotte, and portraits by Briton Rivière of Lord and Lady Roundway of Roundway Park. There is also a portrait by Thomas Phillips of the politician, Joshua Smith, and a portrait by Henry William Pickersgill of the politician, John Pearse.

== See also ==
- Grade II* listed buildings in Wiltshire (P–Z)
