= Market Place, Devizes =

Town square in Devizes, England

Coordinates: 51.3527°N 1.9959°W

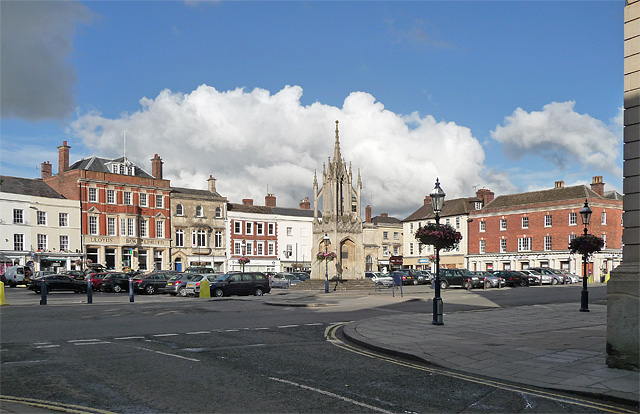
View across Market Place including the Market Cross.

Market Place is a town square in the centre of Devizes in Wiltshire, England. In a northwards direction it merges into Northgate Street heading towards the Wadworth Brewery, while southwards St John's Street connects it to the Town Hall.

It was sited close to the historic Devizes Castle, but it was not until the demolition of its outer fortifications that it could fully develop. During the eighteenth century the area developed many coaching inns as it was located on one of the main routes between the capital London and the fashionable spa town of Bath. From 1857 to 1966 it was served by Devizes railway station in nearby Station Road.

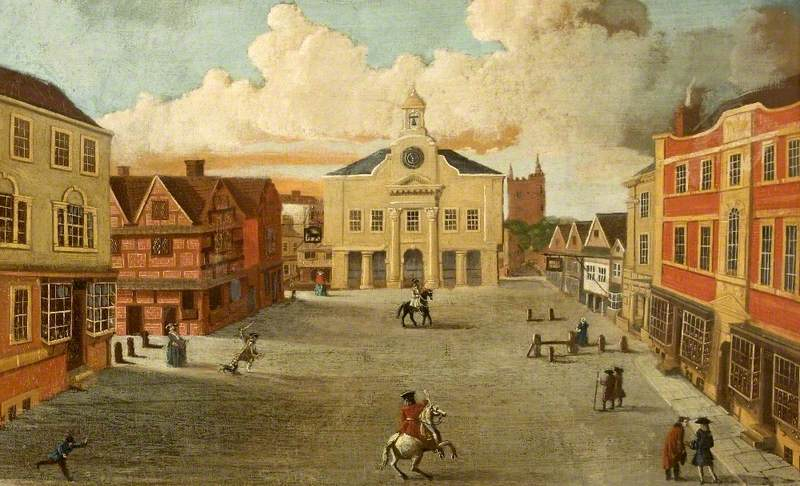
18th century view of the Market Place.

Buildings facing on to it today include The Shambles market hall, the Victorian Corn Exchange and several banks. While some of the old coaching inns have been converted to other uses, the square still prominently features the Bear Hotel, Pelican Inn and Black Swan. The Market Place also contains the Market Cross built in 1814 to a design by James Wyatt and the Estcourt Fountain, erected in 1879.

== Bibliography ==
- Buxton, David. Around Devizes in Old Photographs. Sutton, 1990.
- Pevsner, Nikolaus & Cherry, Bridget . Wiltshire. Yale University Press, 2002.
