= Bear Hotel, Devizes =

Hotel in Devizes, England

Coordinates: 51°21′08″N 1°59′46″W

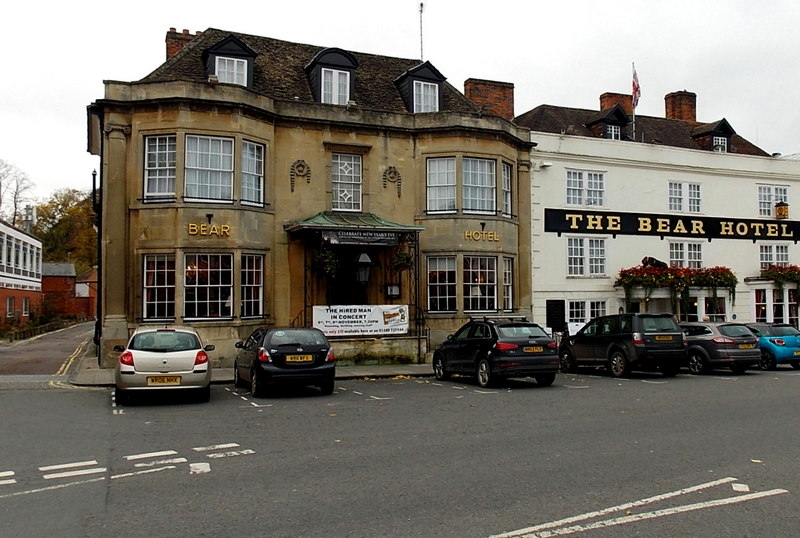
The Bear Hotel with its two distinctive adjacent buildings

The Bear Hotel is a historic coaching inn in the market town of Devizes in Wiltshire, England. On the west side of the town's Market Place, it is one of many coaching inns in the town that once served the route from London to Bath. It is formed of two distinct buildings and is now Grade II* listed by Historic England.

The earliest records of a Bear Hotel on this site are in 1559. The left front is from c.1700 and was given an ashlar facing, considered elegant by Julian Orbach, in around 1810. It has two full-height bay windows, flanked by reeded pilasters; the porch is slender ironwork. Behind the white-painted early-18th-century front of the right-hand building is an earlier structure, probably from the 16th or 17th centuries.

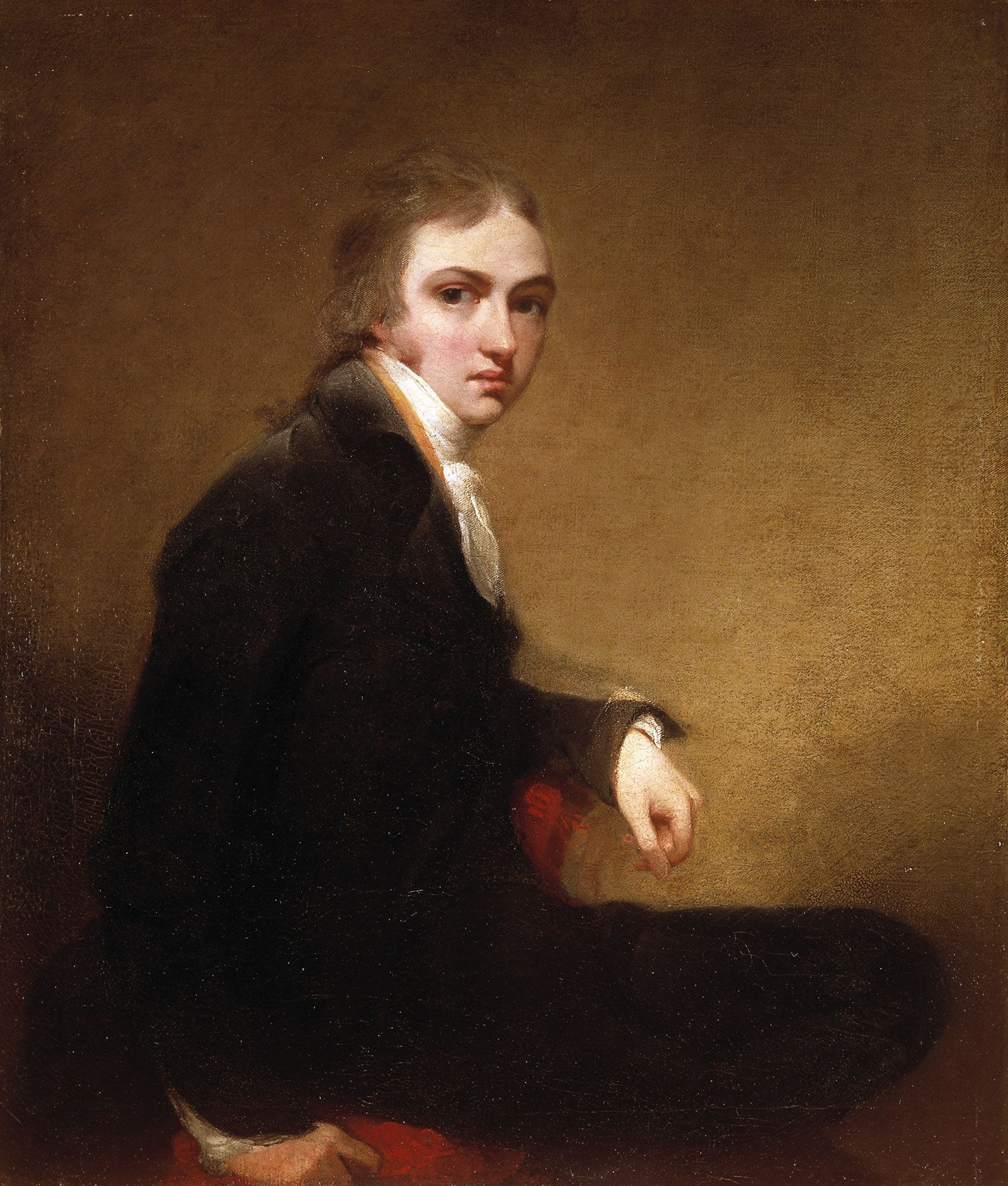
Self-portrait by Thomas Lawrence, 1788

A notable resident was the artist Thomas Lawrence, whose father was landlord of the Bear. He lived there between 1773 and 1780 and as a self-taught child artist he depicted travellers who stayed at the inn, many of them notable society figures on the way to fashionable Bath. His success led to him to turn professional, first in Bath and then London. He became a leading portrait painter and President of the Royal Academy.

Immediately north of the hotel is the town's Corn Exchange.

== See also ==
- Black Swan Hotel, Devizes, another coaching inn in the town

== Bibliography ==
- Buxton, David. Around Devizes in Old Photographs. Sutton, 1990.
- Levey, Michael. Sir Thomas Lawrence. Yale University Press, 2005.
