= Portway House =

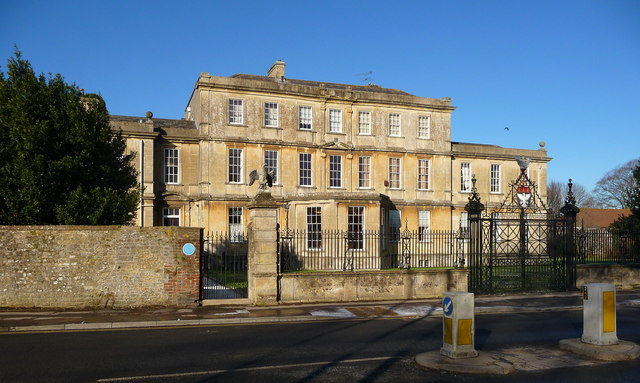

- Location within Wiltshire
- 51.2073°N 2.1824°W
- Location: Warminster, England

History
- Built: 1722

Listed Building – Grade I
- Official name: Portway House
- Designated: 28 April 1952
- Reference no.: 1364442

Portway House is a Grade I listed town house in Warminster, Wiltshire, England.

== History ==
The house was built in 1722 for wealthy clothier Edward Middlecott, the estate (then called Newport) having been bought by his ancestor Richard Middlecott in stages between 1559 and 1568. It replaced Newport manor house, on land owned by the Mauduit family from the 13th to 15th centuries.

Built in Bath stone ashlar, the central seven-bay block has a basement and three storeys, and is flanked on both sides by two-storey wings which were probably added in the late 19th century.

The house was designated as Grade I listed in 1952; the 1760 ironwork screen and central gateway at the roadside are Grade II listed. Nikolaus Pevsner describes the house as "stately but rather bleak" but praises the ironwork.

It served as a dower house for Longleat from 1820 to 1920. In 1955 it was bought by Warminster Urban District Council for use as offices, and from 1958 housed the town's public library. The building was sold after the abolition of the council in 1978, and converted into apartments.
