= Metropolitan Borough of Greenwich =

Former metropolitan borough in London, England

Coordinates: 51.48°N 0.02°E

Greenwich
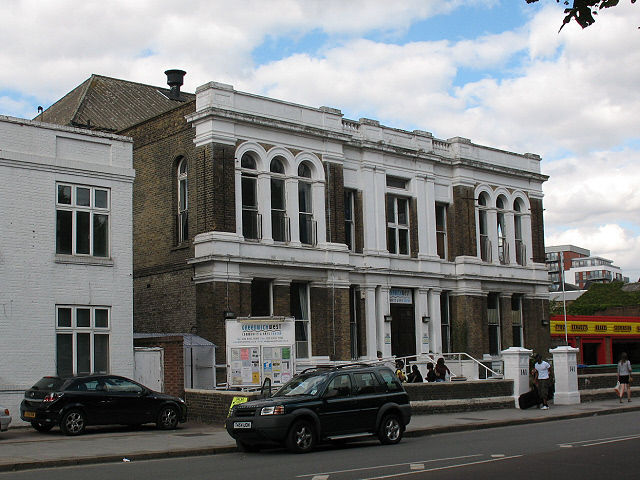
- The former Greenwich Town Hall (until 1939)

- Greenwich within the County of London
- History
  - Created: 1900
  - Abolished: 1965
  - Succeeded by: Royal Borough of Greenwich
- Status: Metropolitan borough
- Government: Greenwich Borough Council
  - HQ: Town Hall, Greenwich High Road (until 1939); new Town Hall (from 1939)
  - Motto: Tempore Utimur (We make use of time)
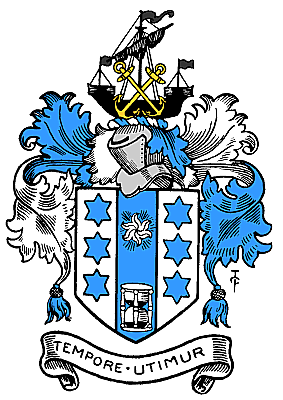
- Map of borough boundary

The Metropolitan Borough of Greenwich was a metropolitan borough in the County of London between 1900 and 1965. It bordered the boroughs of Woolwich, Lewisham and Deptford and, across the River Thames, the borough of Poplar and the County Borough of West Ham in Essex. Within the area of the borough were the Royal Naval College (now the National Maritime Museum), the Royal Observatory and Greenwich Park.

The borough was abolished in 1965, and its area was merged with that of the borough of Woolwich to form the London Borough of Greenwich within the new ceremonial county of Greater London.

== Formation and boundaries ==
The borough was formed from four civil parishes: Charlton-next-Woolwich, Deptford St Nicholas, Greenwich and Kidbrooke. In 1901 Charlton-next-Woolwich and Kidbrooke were merged to form Charlton and Kidbrooke. In 1930 the remaining three civil parishes were combined into a single civil parish called Borough of Greenwich, which was conterminous with the metropolitan borough.

Previous to the borough's formation it had been administered by two separate local bodies: Greenwich District Board of Works and Lee District Board of Works.

== Population and area ==
The borough covered 3,852 acres (15.6 km^{2}). The population in each decennial census was:

Constituent parishes 1801–1899

Year	1801	1811	1821	1831	1841	1851	1861	1871	1881	1891
Population	22,077	25,303	28,748	33,374	39,800	47,377	57,417	56,450	65,411	78,167

Metropolitan Borough 1900–1961

Year	1901	1911	1921	1931	1941	1951	1961
Population	95,780	95,968	100,450	100,924		89,846	85,546

== Politics ==
A map showing the wards of Greenwich Metropolitan Borough as they appeared in 1916.

The borough was divided into eight wards for elections: Charlton & Kidbrooke, Marsh, North West, North, South East, South, St Nicholas Deptford and West.

=== Borough council ===
Metropolitan borough councils elections were held triennially. The first election to the borough council was held on 1 November 1900. The result was a majority for the pro-Conservative Moderates, who had 16 councillors elected. The opposition was formed by the Progressives with 8 seats. At the next election in 1903 Moderates held control with the support of 2 Independent Conservative councillors. By the time of the 1906 election, the Conservatives contested the elections throughout London under the Municipal Reform label. The Municipal Reformers held the council with 21 seats to 5 Progressives and 4 Independents. They held the council at the 1909 and 1912 elections: 1909 saw the first Socialist councillor elected to the council. Due to World War I, the next council election was not held until 1919. The Labour Party took control of the borough, with 20 seats to 10 for the Municipal Reform Party. Three years later the position was reversed, with Municipal Reformers retaking control with 22 seats to Labour's 11. At the 1925 election the Municipal Reform and Labour parties both took 15 seats, and the borough council was consequently under no overall control. The same party composition was returned at the 1928 and 1931 elections. Labour subsequently gained control, which they held at the 1934 election. Labour held the borough at the 1937 election. Elections were again suspended during the Second World War, the next contest being in 1945: Labour held the borough. Elections to boroughs due in November 1948 were postponed to May 1949 to coincide with those for county councils. The Conservative Party contested the elections in the place of the Municipal Reformers. Labour held the council at this and all later elections to the metropolitan borough council, with the Conservatives forming the only other grouping. The last election to the council was held on 10 May 1962, when Labour gained 29 seats to 6 for the Conservatives.

=== Parliamentary constituency ===
A parliamentary borough of Greenwich had been formed by the Reform Act 1832. In 1918 the boundaries were realigned to correspond to the metropolitan borough.

== Coat of arms ==
The borough council was granted a coat of arms by the College of Arms on 15 July 1903. The central band bearing an hour-glass represented the Greenwich Meridian and the surrounding stars the Royal Observatory. The crest above the shield was an ancient ship and crossed anchors, standing for the connections of Greenwich with the Royal Navy. The Latin motto was Tempore utimur or "We use time": a reference to Greenwich Mean Time.

Some charges from these arms were taken over for the arms of the London Borough of Greenwich in 1965 and in 2012 for the new coat of arms of the Royal Borough of Greenwich.

== Town Halls ==
West Greenwich House was built in 1876 and served as headquarters for the Greenwich District Board of Works before it was inherited by the new Borough Council in 1900. When built it had a dome and lantern above the parapet. It served as the Town Hall until 1939 after which it housed other council offices. Today it thrives as the West Greenwich Community and Arts Centre; the building was recently restored and refurbished.

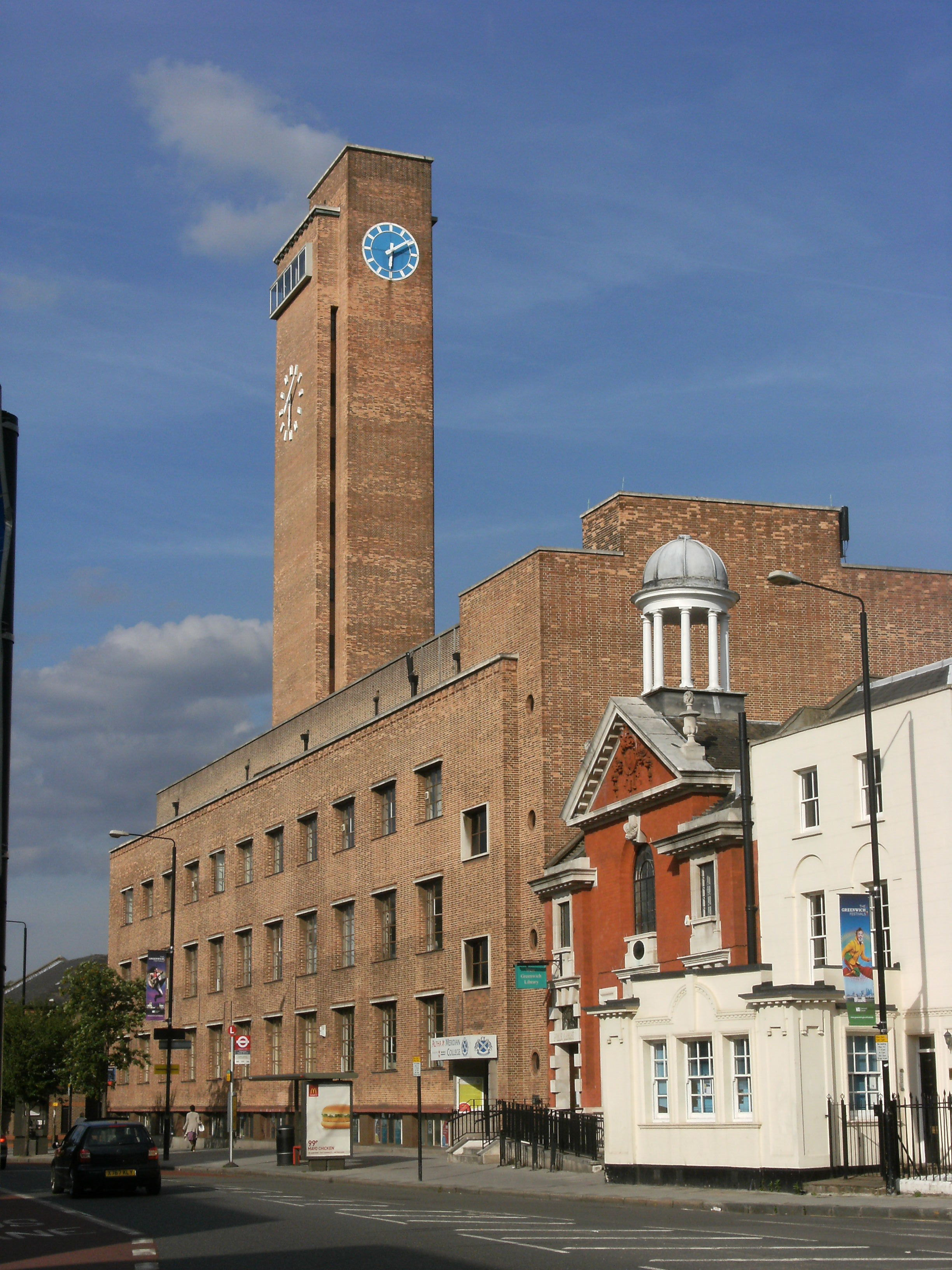
The 1939 Town Hall, further east from the 1876 building.

In 1939, a new and much larger Greenwich Town Hall and Borough Hall were built on the corner of Greenwich High Road and Royal Hill in the Art Deco style. When the Metropolitan Borough of Greenwich was merged into the London Borough of Greenwich in the 1960s, Woolwich Town Hall was used as the headquarters for the new larger borough instead. The Town Hall and Borough Hall buildings are now occupied by GSM London and a dance centre (Greenwich Dance) respectively.
