= Edinburgh Youth Games =

The Edinburgh Youth Games are the biggest youth multi-sport games held annually in Edinburgh.

== Purpose ==
The main aim of the games is to encourage sporting participation amongst young people, some of which may have less of an opportunity to take part in physical activity than others.

== History ==
The Edinburgh Youth Games have been held for 12 years and each year attracts over 1500 participants from primary, secondary and special schools across the city.

== Sponsors ==
The event has been sponsored by Edinburgh Airport for 12 years, and is supported by Edinburgh Leisure.

== Sports ==
Sports featured in the event include athletics, basketball, football, golf, gymnastics, swimming and tennis.

== See also ==
- UK School Games
- London Youth Games
- Commonwealth Youth Games
