= Greenwich District (Metropolis) =

Greenwich
- Board of works district
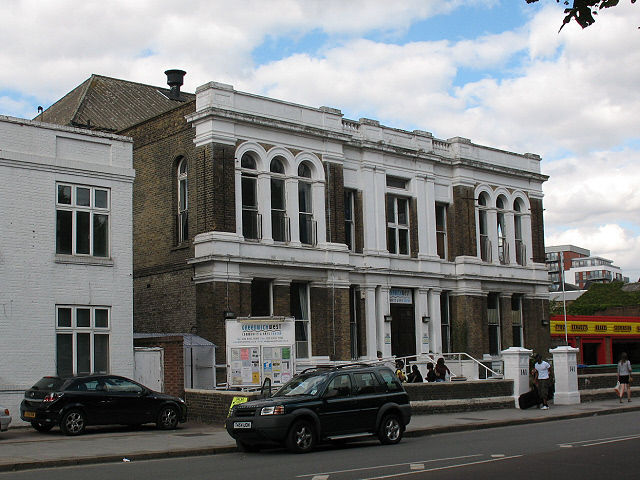
- Offices of the Greenwich District Board of Works 1876-1900 and then Greenwich Town Hall from 1900-1939
- Area
  - 1891: 3,425 acres (13.86 km^{2})
- Population
  - 1891: 165,413
- Density
  - 1891: 48/acre
- History
  - Created: 1855
  - Abolished: 1900
  - Succeeded by: Metropolitan Borough of Deptford; Metropolitan Borough of Greenwich
- Status: Board of works district
- Government: Greenwich District Board of Works
  - HQ: Greenwich Church Street (1855–1877); Town Hall, Greenwich Road (1877–1900)

Greenwich was a local government district within the metropolitan area of London, England from 1855 to 1900. It was formed by the Metropolis Management Act 1855 and was governed by the Greenwich District Board of Works, which consisted of elected vestrymen.

Until 1889 the district was partly in the counties of Kent and Surrey, but included in the area of the Metropolitan Board of Works. In 1889 the area of the MBW was constituted the County of London, and the district board became a local authority under the London County Council.

== Area ==
The district comprised the following civil parishes (electing members)

- Deptford St Nicholas (Kent) (6)
- Deptford St Paul (Kent), including Hatcham (Surrey) (21)
- Greenwich (Kent) (30)

Under the Metropolis Management Act 1855 any parish that exceeded 2,000 ratepayers was to be divided into wards; as such the parishes of Greenwich and St Paul Deptford within the Greenwich District Board of Works were each divided into four wards (electing vestrymen): Greenwich - No. 1 or Church (15), No. 2 or Ravensbourne (12), No. 3 or Hospital (12) and No. 4 or Blackheath (9). St Paul Deptford - No. 1 or North (15), No. 2 or South (21), No. 3 or East (18) and No. 4 or West (18).

In 1894 as its population had increased the parish of Greenwich was re-divided into six wards (electing vestrymen): No. 1 North (18), Marsh [Nos. 2 & 3 North] (21), South East (18), South (12), West (15) and North West (12).

== Mortality ==
The number of deaths reported were as follows. Greenwich parish was the location of Greenwich Hospital, Greenwich Union Workhouse and Dreadnought Hospital which explains the relatively higher death count.

Year	Deptford St Nicholas	Deptford St Paul	Greenwich
1855	166	699	1,633
1860	168	778	1,070

== Abolition ==
There was a proposal in 1862 to dissolve the Greenwich District. In the Metropolis Management Amendment Bill there was provision that the Greenwich vestry would become incorporated as a local authority and the remaining area would have formed the Deptford District.

The district was abolished in 1900 and split as follows:

- Deptford St Nicholas to Metropolitan Borough of Greenwich
- Deptford St Paul to Metropolitan Borough of Deptford
- Greenwich to Metropolitan Borough of Greenwich
