= Big Dance =

Big Dance may refer to:

- NCAA Division I men's basketball tournament, a basketball tournament in the United States
- Big Dance UK, a nine-day biennial festival of dance in the United Kingdom
- AFL Grand Final, an Australian rules football championship game, colloquially referred to as “the big dance”
- Big Dance (horse race) in Sydney, Australia
- "The Big Dance", a song by Alex Lifeson from the album Victor
- "The Big Dance" (Degrassi Junior High), a 1987 television episode
