= West Greenwich House =

Municipal building in London, England

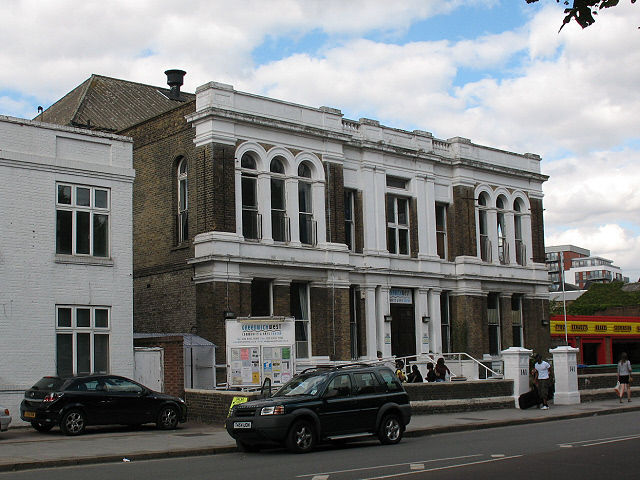
- West Greenwich House

- Shown in Greenwich
- 51.4772°N 0.0161°W
- Location: Greenwich

History
- Built: 1877

Site notes
- Architect: William Wallen
- Architectural style: Italianate style

West Greenwich House, also known as Greenwich West Community and Arts Centre and formerly known as the Old Town Hall, is a former municipal building on Greenwich High Road, Greenwich, London. It is currently used as a community centre.

== History ==
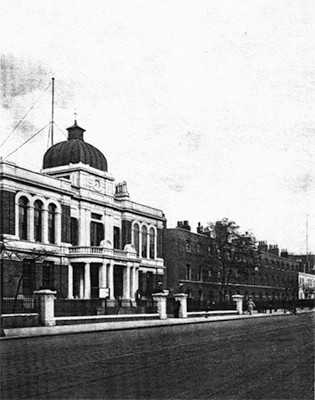
The building in its original form with portico and dome

The building was commissioned to serve as the headquarters of the Greenwich District Board of Works. The foundation stone was laid by the proprietor of the Deptford Brewery, Thomas Norfolk, in his capacity as chairman of the board of works, on 18 April 1877. It was designed by William Wallen in the Italianate style, built by William Tongue of Plumstead in brown brick with stone dressings at a cost of £9,500 and was officially opened by Norfolk on 25 April 1877.

The design involved a symmetrical main frontage of three bays facing onto Greenwich High Road. The central bay, which was slightly recessed, originally featured an oval-shaped portico formed by Doric order columns supporting an entablature and a balustraded parapet. The doorway inside the portico was flanked by pairs of Doric order pilasters supporting a frieze, a cornice, and an entablature. On the first floor, there was a cross window also flanked by Doric order pilasters supporting a frieze, a cornice, and a parapet. The outer bays were fenestrated by pairs of sash windows on the ground floor and by tri-partite round headed windows on the first floor. At roof level, there was originally a central squat clock tower surmounted by an ogee-shaped dome. Internally, the principal room was the board room which was 57.5 feet (17.5 m) long and 40 feet (12 m) wide.

The building became the home of the Metropolitan Borough of Greenwich when it was formed in 1900. After it became inadequate for the council's needs, civic leaders decided to build a new town hall on Royal Hill and relocated there in 1939. A room in the old town hall was allocated for use by the Local Defence Volunteers during the Second World War. On 12 July 1944, the building was badly damaged by a V-1 flying bomb, which destroyed many of the terraced houses on the site to the immediate west of the building.

After the war, part of the building was occupied by the local Housing Department and another part was occupied by the Ministry of Works. The building became a community centre in 1955, offering "meals on wheels" and other services from 1957, and being renamed West Greenwich House in 1958. It was transferred from council management to community management in January 1994, and has subsequently continued to be used as venue for the provision of music and other classes.
