= Greenwich Town Hall, London =

Municipal building in London, England

Greenwich Town Hall
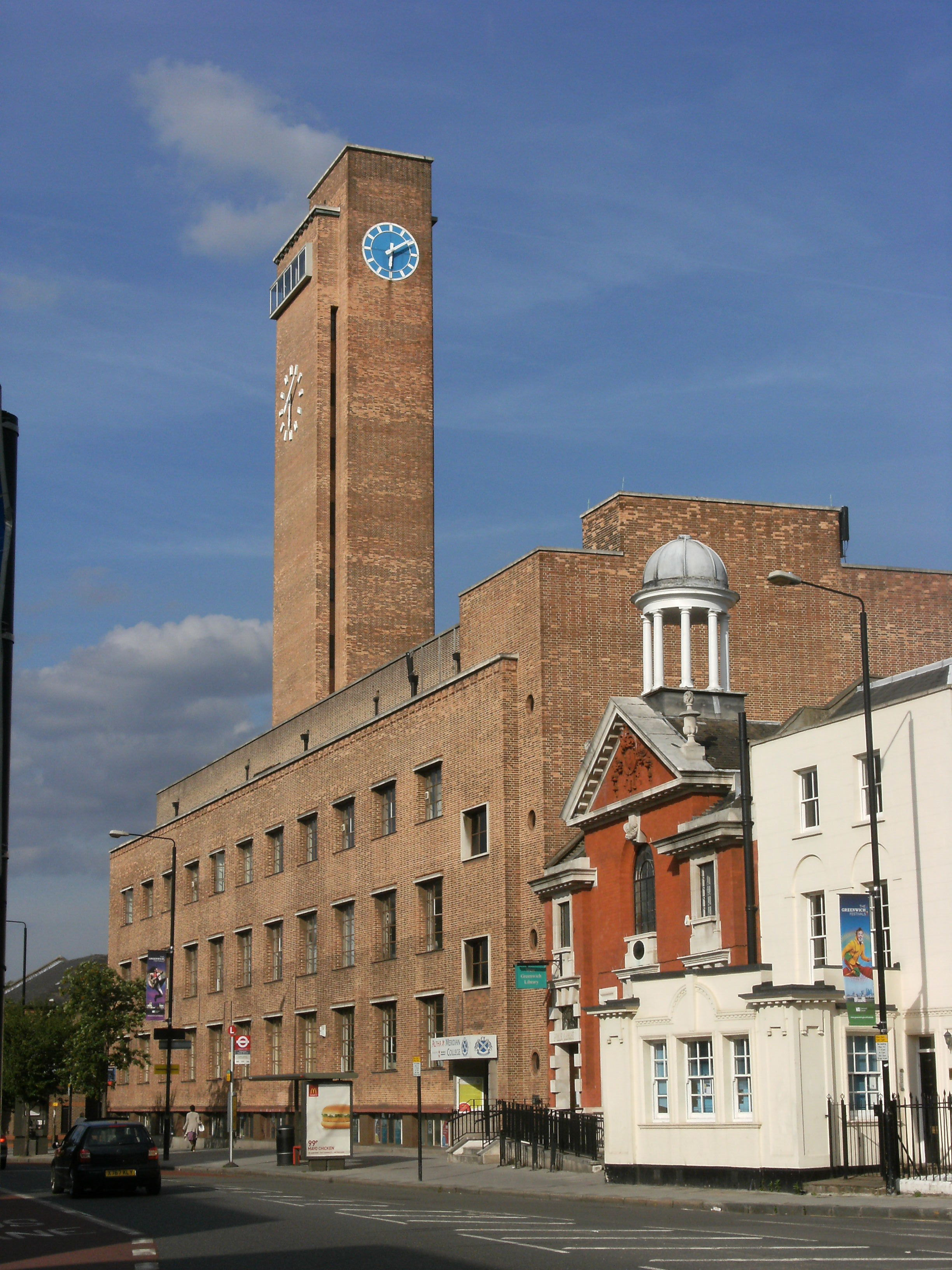
- Greenwich Town Hall

- Shown in Greenwich
- 51.4781°N 0.0109°W
- Location: Greenwich

History
- Built: 1939

Site notes
- Architect: Clifford Culpin
- Architectural style: Art Deco style

Listed Building – Grade II
- Designated: 13 November 1990
- Reference no.: 1213855

Greenwich Town Hall is a municipal building on Royal Hill, Greenwich, London. It is a Grade II listed building.

== History ==
The building was commissioned to replace the old town hall on Greenwich High Road. By the 1930s, it was inadequate for the council's needs and civic leaders decided to build a new town hall: the site they selected for the new building had previously been occupied by the old Greenwich Theatre.

The foundation stone for the new building was laid by the mayor, Councillor Harold Gibbons, on 18 June 1938. The new building was designed by Clifford Culpin in the Art Deco style, built by William Moss & Sons and was completed in 1939. The design involved an asymmetrical main frontage with eleven bays facing onto Royal Hill; the central section had a doorway on the ground floor and there was a window on the first floor with the borough coat of arms above; there was a smaller window on the second floor. A 55.9 metres (183 ft) high tower was erected to the north east of the main block facing onto Greenwich High Road. The principal rooms in the complex included the council chamber itself. At the foot of the tower was a doorway with a canopy showing the signs of the zodiac to a design by Carter & Co. The architectural historian, Sir Nikolaus Pevsner, wrote that Greenwich Town Hall, which shows the influence of Hilversum Town Hall in the Netherlands, was "the only town hall of any London borough to represent the style of our time adequately".

The south east wing of the building contained an assembly hall known as the Borough Hall. It served as an events and concert venue and performers included the band, The Who, in September 1964.

The building remained the headquarters of the Metropolitan Borough of Greenwich until the borough was merged with the Metropolitan Borough of Woolwich to form the London Borough of Greenwich, with its new local seat of government at Woolwich Town Hall, in April 1965.

After the town hall ceased to be the local seat of government, it was extensively altered to create floors in the area of the council chamber in 1974. Renamed Meridian House, to reflect the fact that the prime meridian goes through Greenwich, it became the home of GSM London at that time.

Meanwhile, the Borough Hall continued to be used as a concert venue: the rock band Squeeze gave their first performance there in 1975, as commemorated by a blue plaque on the side of the building. The Borough Hall went on to become the home of Greenwich Dance from 1993 until the organisation moved out in 2018.
