= Big Dance UK =

Biennial dance festival in UK (2006–2016)

Big Dance
- Genre: Dance festival
- Frequency: Biennial
- Location: United Kingdom
- Years active: 2006–2016
- Organiser: Greater London Authority, with Foundation for Community Dance supported by Arts Council England
- People: Jacqueline Rose (Director)
- Website: www.bigdance.org.uk

Big Dance was a dance initiative in the United Kingdom, which happened every three years from 2006 to 2016. It was a nine-day biennial festival of dancing, mostly taking place in non-traditional dance spaces such as museums, shopping centres, parks, bridges, stations, galleries, and libraries, with the aim of inspiring people in different ways through dance. Initiated in 2006 by the Mayor of London, Ken Livingstone, for the Greater London Authority, the programme was delivered in partnership with Arts Council England and delivered events and inspiration to be physically active through dance.

The second Big Dance festival took place from 5–13 July 2008, following the second mayoral election in May 2008, when Boris Johnson was elected as the next Mayor of London.

In 2009, the programme was selected as London's Legacy Trust UK project, receiving £2.89 million to deliver the festivals in 2010 and 2012 with an ongoing development programme led by the Big Dance Hubs – five leading dance organisations in the capital.

Big Dance 2012 was London's Legacy Trust UK programme, delivered by Greater London Authority in partnership with Arts Council England. The national programme was delivered by the Foundation for Community Dance in partnership with the Big Dance Hubs.

Big Dance 2012 was the largest cultural participation project of the London 2012 Festival, which was the culmination of the Cultural Olympiad for the London 2012 Olympic and Paralympic Games.

Big Dance 2014 was the most recent festival which centred on the XX Commonwealth Games in Glasgow.

Big Dance 2016 was the final festival, bringing Big Dance to a finale after a decade. The dates were 2–10 July 2016.

== Introduction ==
=== About Big Dance ===
Big Dance is a London-based dance initiative. Initiated by the mayor of London, it displayed a wide variety of dance from breakdancing to ballet

Big Dance 2012 was one of the keynote projects of London 2012 Festival.

== History ==
=== Big Dance 2006 ===
The first Big Dance took place over nine days, from 15 to 23 July 2006. Launched by Ken Livingstone, it received support from Tessa Jowell, the then Secretary of State for Culture, Media and Sport.

Led by the Culture team at the Greater London Authority as part of the Mayor of London's office, the programme was delivered in partnership with Arts Council England and received a commission by BBC One for a 90-minute programme, Dancing in the Street, which was a live broadcast from Trafalgar Square on the evening of 22 July 2006. Dancing in the Street was co-hosted by Bruce Forsyth and Zoë Ball and involved many of the Strictly Come Dancing stars, such as Anton du Beke, Erin Boag and Camilla Dallerup.

There were over 400 dance events in parks, on bandstands, in shop windows, tube stations, schools, museums and even at the top of Nelson's Column.

Big Dance has also developed a reputation for both creating and breaking Guinness World Records. To provide examples, nearly 9,000 people took part in the Big Dance Class world-record attempt in 37 different cities choreographed by Luca Silvestrini, artistic director of Protein Dance in partnership with the BBC radio network. As part of Dancing in the Street, a new world record was created when 752 dancers performed 44 different dance styles, choreographed by Jeanefer Jean-Charles, simultaneously to one music track in the culmination of an evening of dance in Trafalgar Square that was broadcast by BBC One to an audience of almost five million people. This also included the 'Longest Riverdance Line' attempt with 116 dancers, and the 'Most Swing Flips in One Minute' by Russell Sargeant from the Jiving Lindy Hoppers.

Many dance organisations, artists, and teachers arranged open classes and workshops, performances in local public spaces. For example, The Place took over the forecourt of the British Library, Pineapple Dance Studios opened its doors, Siobhan Davies Dance hosted live streaming of dance from Australia accompanied by music from Korea and live performance in the entrance to the building. Dance UK launched its Manifesto at City Hall, and London Youth Dance held its first pan-London youth dance showcase in The Scoop – an outdoor amphitheatre at More London.

The critical success factor of the campaign was the simplicity of the idea and the enthusiasm of the dance community and others to engage new audiences and participants in dance. Transport for London were a key partner in providing promotional opportunities through the tube network. With a high-profile PR campaign and the production of the Big Dance Time Out Guide, the pan-London campaign was well supported through a wide range of marketing outlets including londondance.com, which invited schools, professional and voluntary groups to upload their information to the website.

=== Big Dance 2008 ===
More than 500,000 people were involved in Big Dance 2008 in London, which was delivered with funding from the Greater London Authority and Arts Council England from 5–13 July 2008. Big Dance is a key element of the Cultural Strategy.

The festival was launched on Millennium Bridge, with the Mayor of London, Boris Johnson, Erin Boag and Bruno Tonioli from (Strictly Come Dancing) surrounded by over 50 dancers ranging from jive and Latin enthusiasts, to Flamenco dancers and representatives from the English National Ballet and the Society of London Theatre.

Other events in the festival included performances in shop windows on Oxford Street and Regent Street, alfresco dancing in Regent's Park, and performances on the steps of St Paul's Cathedral by students from London's dance schools, choreographed by Shobhana Jeyasingh.

The Big Chair Dance was a feature of 2008 presented by Capital Age Festival at the Southbank Centre and involved more than 200 older Londoners in seven localities, around the capital, working with choreographers: Maresa von Stockert, Jonzi D and Gauri Sharma Tripathi.

Breaking Records was an event presented by Big Dance and BBC Blast that took place in Trafalgar Square, where five world dance records were attempted in one afternoon. This day was led by Strictly Come Dancing's Erin Boag, and BBC London were the media partners. Presenters Lesley Joseph and Christopher Biggins were also in attendance, and the day culminated with a 'silent rave' to a DJ set by BBC London 94.9's very own Jazzie B. The record attempts were:

1. Largest Bollywood Dance by Sapnay School of Dance
2. Most Ballet Dancers on Pointe
3. Most Kip-Ups in One Minute

The penultimate moment of the festival was marked by a mass choreographed dance event, with 2,008 people dancing a routine choreographed by Aletta Collins in Trafalgar Square London at 5 pm on 12 July 2008. This was a Guinness World Record attempt: the Largest Dance Class in the World Learnt Remotely, supported by a viral web campaign of 'Sign up, Warm Up, Turn Up... and Dance!’ People of all ages were encouraged to watch and learn an online video of the dance in preparation for the event, so that they could turn up on the day and perform it as a mass performance.

In 2008, Big Dance was proposed by the London Cultural Strategy Group as the regional programme that best met the aims of Legacy Trust UK, as the programme that offers significant potential to reach new participants and unite communities through dance activities. The programme offered a natural link between the arts and sport as part of the cultural programme in the lead up to the Olympic and Paralympic Games in 2012. Legacy Trust UK is a charitable trust in the United Kingdom, established in 2007 to support a range of cultural and sporting activities in connection with 2012 Olympic and Paralympic Games to be held in London. The aim of this trust is to provide a lasting cultural and sporting legacy from the Games across the UK. There are 12 regional programmes across the UK.

Legacy Trust UK provided funding of £2.89 million, which was agreed in June 2008 to deliver the festivals in 2010 and 2012, as well as an ongoing programme of development.

=== Big Dance 2010 ===
Big Dance 2010 took place between 3–11 July 2010.

The programme was launched on 20 January 2010 at Spitalfields Market with The Big Dance Trailer, a piece of choreography by Jeanefer Jean-Charles with sound compilation by Mikey J of Boy Blue, that involved the five London Hubs and other community dance groups. The artists featured were: Avant Garde Dance, soloists from the English National Ballet, London Swing Dance Society, Jasmin Vardimon and Siobhan Davies Dance.

The third Big Dance festival was officially launched at the London Palladium by the Mayor of London, Boris Johnson on 1 July 2010 to 2,000 people with Jerry Mitchell, Sheridan Smith and Camilla Dallerup. This exclusive performance was choreographed by Jerry Mitchell, whose work includes Love Never Dies and Legally Blonde the Musical. He created a choreographed version of You Can't Stop The Beat from Hairspray for a cast that included the Dance Captains of the West End musicals and students from all the dance schools part of the Council for Dance Education and Training network.

The 2010 programme also featured 850 events such as workshops, photography exhibitions and various performances around London in heritage sites such as Kensington Palace, an underground bunker in Dalston, many shopping centres and included projects such as the Big Dance Schools Pledge, an international partnership project with the British Council which aims to: encourage schools in the UK and across the world to do an extra 20 minutes of dance a day during Big Dance Week and join in a world-record attempt. In 2010, over 650 schools took the pledge to offer 100 minutes of dance during Big Dance week, and to take part in an attempt to break the world record for the Largest Multi-venue Dance Class. The choreography was created by Hakeem Onibudo, artistic director of Impact Dance and the music was composed by Mikey J, Boy Blue Entertainment.

The Big Dance Bus, an adapted Routemaster bus, made its debut with a tour of 19 stops in 16 London boroughs reaching an estimated 98,960 members of the public and delivered 74 workshops. In addition, the Bus made an appearance on the beachside in Hove, Brighton to launch Big Dance South-East.

The Big Dance Bubble was a fully portable special event space known as ROSY. Designed by raumlaborberlin and produced by Up Projects, this Portavilion Bubble made five stops in London parks each one commissioned by the Big Dance Hubs.

In addition, 50 x £1,000 Micro-Grants were awarded for inspiring projects across the capital.

The Big Dance Older People's programme, Dancing stAGE saw 150 older people perform choreography by Natasha Gilmore on the Clore Ballroom at the Royal Festival Hall, as the focus of Capital Age Festival and was produced by East London Dance.

The Big Dance Pop-Up Cinema also made its debut with its inflatable screen which displayed Billy Elliot in Walpole Park, Ealing, Strictly Ballroom in Potter's Field by the Tower of London with a workshop by Strictly Dancing star, Karen Hardy and Hairspray in Hornchurch, Havering.

The Largest Tea Dance world-record attempt by the Royal Opera House was successful with 254 couples, although this record has now been overtaken.

The finale of Big Dance 2010 was marked by a massive dance performance called the Big World Dance directed by Luca Silvestrini of Protein Dance and choreographed using inspiration from the Southbank Centre's Dance Atlas, an interactive online map where people posted their own signature moves. Thousands of people were invited to transform central London into a giant open-air stage for a show stopping dance on a gigantic scale, with the start line at Southbank Centre and the finishing line at Trafalgar Square.

Big Dance received sponsorship from T-Mobile for the 2010 programme which included a weekend of dance events at Westfield London Shopping Centre, a pan-London tour by the Big Dance Bus, a competition by Louie Spence and an outdoor screening and workshop of Dirty Dancing in Trafalgar Square.

== Big Dance 2012 ==
The Big Dance 2012 festival took place on 7–15 July 2012. It was the Olympic Edition of Big Dance. The 2012 plans were announced to the press on 4 May 2011 at the Royal Opera House and included an interview of Wayne McGregor, artistic director of Wayne McGregor / Random Dance and also Resident Choreographer at the Royal Ballet, by Jacqueline Rose, Director of Big Dance.

The programme aims are to be fully accessible and open to all age ranges and communities i.e. under 5's, schools, students, young and older people.

The strands of the programme include:

- Performances – small and massive in usual and unusual spaces and locations
- Photography – dance is the inspiration for exhibitions in all spaces
- Film competitions/screenings – dance-led content in all genres
- Fashion – designs inspired by/and for dance
- Libraries engagement programme – reading about dance
- Archives programme – revealing the history of dance and dance companies
- Debates – choreographers/critics
- Big Dance Bus Tour
- International Schools Pledge with the British Council
- World Record attempts – in dance

The key dates for the campaign, which included a 7-week countdown period to the 9-day festival, were:

- Big Dance Trail – 18 May 2012
- Big Dance Week – 7–15 July 2012

=== Leading up to 2012 ===
A number of Big Dance projects took place in the year leading up to 2012.

Most recently, dance students from the University of East London performed the Big Dance Royal Flash Mob outside Buckingham Palace. What appeared to be a spontaneous dance performance (flash mob) had been a few months in the planning and had formal permission from the palace to stage the event to celebrate The Queen's and The Duke of Edinburgh's patronage of the Performing Arts for young people in the United Kingdom.

The students performed Anna Buonomo's choreography to a mix by Michael Floyd of M.O Creatives Ltd. Additional dancers were brought in from Creative Academy, Middlesex University, London Contemporary Dance School, Havering Schools, The Turbelles and Ultimate Dance NRG making a total of 130 dancers. They danced to Queen's We Will Rock You blasting on the steps of the Queen Victoria Memorial.

Dance to Work was a programme led by the London Big Dance Hubs that took place with 10 employers across the commercial, local authorities, charity and health sectors across London in 2011. The aim of this programme was to explore the benefit of creative dance projects taking place in or through the workplace which improves the physical, mental and emotional health of employees. The projects involved up to 10 hours of dance activity, with an experienced dance artist, to create a dance work for live performance and/or film. Groups also had opportunities to attend performances and take part in other activities. A celebratory event at the Lilian Baylis Studios, Sadler's Wells, brought participants together from across the projects to perform their dance works, watch the films and socialise.

=== Big Dance Trail ===
The Big Dance Trail started on Friday 18, May 2012, with a world record attempt with schools across the world for the : Largest Simultaneous Dance Routine – Multi Venue. 1,500 locations and 265,000 people is the target. The choreography was devised by Wayne McGregor and launched in January 2012. This event was followed by a weekend of 'Warm Up events for the Nation'. The Big Dance Bus, with its pop-up dance floor, set off on its tour of London.

The Big Dance Schools Pledge is an international partnership project with the British Council. It was an 'Inspire' project and part of the Get Set + programme. The project had two aims:

1. Encourage schools in the UK and across the world to do an extra 20 minutes of dance a day during Big Dance Week (7–15 July 2012)
2. Encourage schools in the UK and across the world to take part in a world-record attempt for the 'Largest Simultaneous Dance Routine – Multi Venue' on 18 May 2012.

The aim of the programme was to encourage schools to use dance as a fun and creative way to increase physical activity in the run-up to the London 2012 Olympic and Paralympic Games. The British Council's Schools Online programme promoted the Big Dance Schools Pledge to schools around the world. This project forms part of its work to support lasting partnerships between schools in the UK and other countries. with the aim of increasing young people's capacity in the skills, understanding and outlook required to live and work in a global society.

The choreography was available for download from the Big Dance website in January 2012. Participants were invited to learn the choreography in their schools and take part in a World Record attempt on their school sites at 1 pm on 18 May 2012. Schools were encouraged to undertake to provide an extra 100 minutes of dance during Big Dance Week: 7–15 July 2012. A total of 121,000 young people took part in this world record attempt across 25 nations.

The Big Dance Bus is an adapted double-decker Routemaster London bus, touring to locations to host a day of dance with its own special bus stop and pop-up dance floor. The aim of this programme is to take dance to areas that do not have any other cultural infrastructure or to areas where people do not traditionally engage with the arts.

Each individual bus stop is programmed to include a mixture of any or all of the following:

- Workshops that cover a range of dance styles
- Local performance showcases
- Dance competitions
- Flash Mob events
- Provide an open stage for freestyling
- Tea Dances

The Big Dance Bus has toured in 2010, 2012 and 2014.

The Big Dance Pop-Up Cinema, with the giant inflatable screen, screened a range of films in outdoor locations. The events took place in the evening at sundown following a day of activity in the space in front of the Pop-Up Cinema.

Big Dance Library Events, took place in local libraries to promote the wealth of resources on offer to encourage interest in dance and people involved in dance. This involved readings of a selection of titles, and having dance performances in or around the library buildings.

=== Big Dance Week ===
In Big Dance Week, 7–15 July 2012, there were many events and performances taking place across the UK coordinated by the Big Dance Hubs and many other individuals and organisations.

The Big Street Dance Day, took place on Saturday 14 July 2012, was the UK moment for the celebration of dance in public squares across the country. The aim was to encourage as many organisations as possible to take over a public space whether it be a street, square, park or sports stadium and provide as many opportunities as possible for people to dance together against the backdrop of the Olympic & Paralympic Games. International partners were also encouraged to organise events locally.

Big Dance Trafalgar Square 2012 took place in London. Wayne McGregor as the Creative Director for Trafalgar Square created a large-scale dance piece for 1000 participants from across London who performed alongside professional dancers from Wayne McGregor | Random Dance, English National Ballet, community groups and vocational schools across the capital. Channel 4 commissioned Leopard Films to make a film 'Big Dance 2012' which was broadcast on Sunday 15 July.

Big Dance 2014 Big Dance 2014 was the Commonwealth Edition with the backdrop of the XX Commonwealth Games which was held in Glasgow.

The Big Dance Festival Week took place from 7–13 July 2014.

The Big Dance Pledge took place on 16 May 2014. The choreography was produced by Scottish Ballet. Nearly 70,000 people performed this dance across 24 nations.

The Big Dance Bus toured for its third time making 17 stops which included:

== Function ==
The function of the Big Dance programme is to use the 'power of dance to mobilise communities' and generate a legacy of change.

== Structure ==
Big Dance became London's Legacy Trust UK programme led by the Mayor of London in partnership with Arts Council England in 2009.

The fourth Big Dance took place from 7–15 July 2012, as part of London Festival 2012 – the finale of the Cultural Olympiad with a national programme that 'wrapped around' Big Dance in London.

Big Dance 2012 became a national programme led by Foundation for Community Dance in collaboration with the Greater London Authority, the Council for Dance Education and Training, the Dance Champions Group, Sport and Recreation Alliance, and Youth Dance England on behalf of the consortium Dance Takes the Lead – a UK-wide alliance of dance organisations brought together to maximise the opportunities of London 2012 for community and participatory dance. The members of Dance Takes the Lead were:

- Akademi for the South Asian Dance Alliance (SADA)
- Association of Dance of the African Diaspora (ADAD)
- Big Dance 2012
- Council for Dance Education and Training (CDET)
- Dancing for the Games
- Dance UK
- English Folk Dance and Song Society (EFDSS)
- Exercise, Movement and Dance Partnership (EMDP)
- Foundation for Community Dance
- imove
- Royal Academy of Dance (RAD)
- Sport and Recreation Alliance
- The Dance Champions Group
- Imperial Society of Teachers of Dancing (ISTD)
- The National Dance Network (NDN)
- YDance
- Youth Dance England (YDE)

The London programme received support from a range of other organisations including:

Sport England, NHS London – Change4Life, London Councils, Museums, Libraries and Archives, Interactive and Shape.

Big Dance is highlighted within London 2012 Olympic and Paralympic Games Health Legacy Compendium reported by NHS London.

=== Partners ===
Greater London Authority (GLA) is a unique form of strategic citywide government for London. It is made up of a directly elected mayor and a separately elected assembly. The mayor is London's spokesman who leads the preparation of statutory strategies on transport, spatial development, economic development, culture and the environment. The mayor also controls the budgets for the GLA, Transport for London (TFL), the London Development Agency (LDA), the Metropolitan Police Authority (MPA) and London Fire and Emergency Planning Authority. The Big Dance programme is led by the Greater London Authority, who provide access to networks, media, marketing and funding opportunities and support many areas of the programme.

Arts Council England works to get great art to everyone by championing, developing and investing in artistic experiences that enrich people's lives. They support a range of artistic activities from theatre to music, literature to dance, photography to digital art, and carnival to crafts. Arts Council England's 'Achieving Great Art For Everyone', a 10-year strategic framework for the arts, shares many of the key strategic aims with Big Dance. It also has the independence, legal, financial and administrative structures needed to support the programme, to ensure it operates with transparency and fairness, and that it complies with the responsibilities of public funding. Arts Council England was a key partner in initiating the pilot Big Dance celebrations across England, with the London office having funding and development involvement in major events in London.

Legacy Trust UK had programmes in each English region and in Northern Ireland, Scotland and Wales as well as four national programmes. It is registered as a charity in England and Wales, and its aim is "to make awards of money to individuals or organisations for charitable purposes including, without limitation, cultural, educational, healthy sporting and other charitable activities for the benefit of the community in any approved territory."

As the major funder of the Big Dance programme, Legacy Trust UK offered the opportunity to help create lasting and life-changing benefits from London 2012 Olympic & Paralympic Games. Big Dance London was one of the 12 regional programmes supported by the LTUK. The Trust's funding will act as a catalyst to link grassroots activities into the lead up to the Games on the basis on the three fundamental objectives:

- To unite culture, sport and education, in line with the values and vision of the Olympics
- To make a difference to all those involved
- To support grassroots projects, often small in scale, and uniting communities of interest at local and regional level

=== Big Dance Hubs ===
The Big Dance Hubs have been crucial to the delivery of the programme across the nation and will continue provide a network and legacy for the programme.

The Big Dance Hubs are leading dance development organisations with an appropriate level of stability, expertise, and have the aspiration to facilitate the uniting of cultural and physical activity across the range of partners through dance.

All organisations, whilst different have experience in working with local authorities and other partners, and expertise in learning and participation, possibly providing pathways for progression from initial encounter to high-level performance, participatory programmes for particular groups, or host youth dance companies and outreach activities.

Big Dance Hubs in London

The Big Dance Hubs plans for Big Dance build on existing expertise and experience, and together the organisations provide a network of diverse strengths and specialisms in a range of dance genres.

In London, there are five Big Dance Hubs, and they are as follows:

Area in London	Hubs
East	East London Dance
West	English National Ballet
South East	Greenwich Dance
North	Sadler's Wells
South	Siobhan Davies Dance

Each of the five hubs are responsible for coordinating the activity of a number of local authorities in the area that they are based in. There are a total of 33 local authorities (the London boroughs and the City of London) which make up the Greater London area. These local authorities are coordinated by London Councils.

Allowing for participation between the major events in the Big Dance celebratory weeks and some repeat involvement, it is estimated that between 1.2 and 1.8 million people were involved over the four years as part of the ongoing programmes in London. This would represent around one quarter of the population of London. Across the UK, 3.2 million people were involved in Big Dance 2012.

The success of the London Big Dance Hub network has provided a suitable structure to build upon for a national programme. The national programme is coordinated through eight Big Dance Hubs across the English region, and they are:

Region	Hubs	City
South West	Dance South West	Bournemouth, cross-region
South East	South East Dance	Brighton, cross-region
North West	Merseyside Dance Initiative (MDI)	Liverpool, Merseyside
Yorkshire	Yorkshire Dance	Leeds
North East	Dance City	Newcastle upon Tyne
East	Dance East	Ipswich
East Midlands	Dance4	Nottingham
West Midlands	DanceFest	Birmingham and cross-region
