= Old Town Hall, Woolwich =

Municipal building in London, England

Old Town Hall
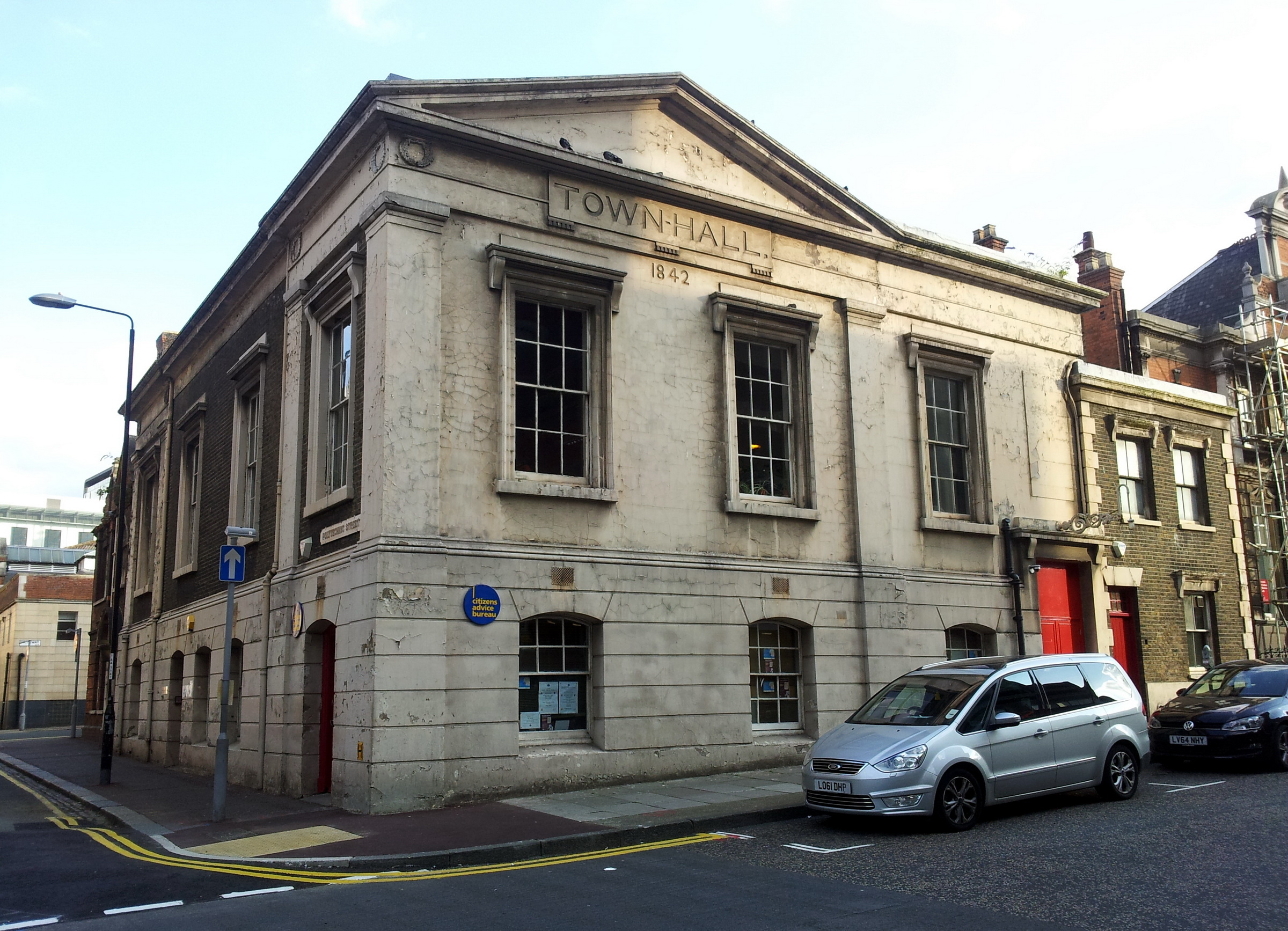
- The building in 2015

- Shown in the London Borough of Greenwich
- 51.4905°N 0.0643°E
- Location: Calderwood Street, Woolwich

History
- Built: 1842

Site notes
- Architectural style: Neoclassical style

Listed Building – Grade II
- Official name: Woolwich Old Town Hall
- Designated: 8 June 1973
- Reference no.: 1079064

The Old Town Hall is a former municipal building on Calderwood Street in Woolwich, London. The building, which is currently in commercial and community use, is a Grade II listed building.

== History ==
The old town hall was commissioned by the town commissioners to replace an earlier town hall, built in around 1839, which was almost immediately sold to the Metropolitan Police. The site selected for the new building, the second town hall, was on the corner of William Street (now Calderwood Street) and Lower Market Street (now Polytechnic Street).

The new building was designed in the neoclassical style, built in brick and ashlar stone and was completed in 1842. The design involved a short frontage of two bays facing onto Calderwood Street with a longer frontage of four bays facing onto Polytechnic Street. The building was rusticated on the ground floor, accessed through segmental headed doorways on the Polytechnic Street frontage, and was fenestrated by sash windows with stone surrounds. The Calderwood Street frontage, which was faced in stone on both floors, was surmounted by a panel, inscribed with the words "Town Hall", and by a pediment. Internally, the principal rooms were the board room and assembly hall on the first floor. The building was initially shared with Woolwich County Court. It was extended along Calderwood Street, by one extra bay, in 1868 or 1878 (sources are unclear), to create an extra courtroom.

Following the sinking of SS Princess Alice, which involved the deaths of between 600 and 700 people on the River Thames on 3 September 1878, Charles Carttar, the coroner for West Kent, opened the inquest and took the jury to view the bodies at the old town hall and at Woolwich Pier.

In 1889 the parish of Woolwich became part of the newly formed County of London and in 1900 the Metropolitan Borough of Woolwich was formed from the parishes of Woolwich, Plumstead and Eltham. This prompted the new council to procure a more substantial town hall which was completed in Wellington Street in 1906.

The old town hall was subsequently re-purposed for commercial and community use. As well as accommodating the local branch of Citizens Advice, the council has allowed the Indian Cultural Society to operate a day care centre there since 1988. An extensive programme of refurbishment works, which included repairs to the masonry and the removal of internal partitions, was completed in 2022.
