= Deptford St Nicholas =

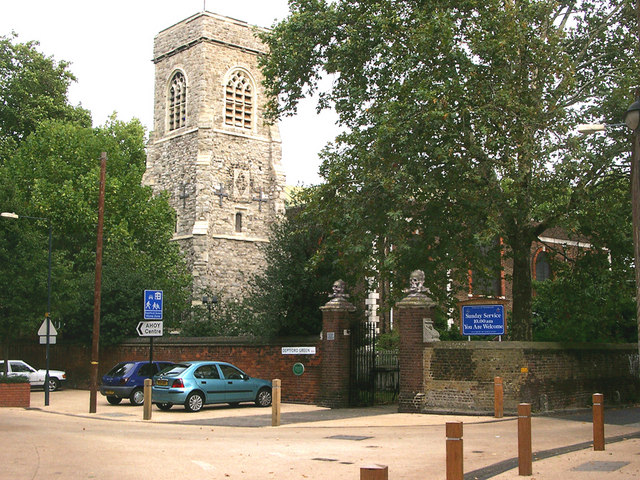
- The parish occupied a compact area around the Church of St Nicholas, Deptford
- Area
  - 1921: 115 acres
  - Coordinates: 51.483°N 0.024°W
- Population
  - 1801: 6,933
  - 1921: 7,582
- History
  - Origin: Part of Deptford ancient parish
  - Created: 1730
  - Abolished: 1930
  - Succeeded by: Borough of Greenwich civil parish
- Status: Civil parish
- Government: Deptford St Nicholas Vestry (1730–1855); Greenwich District Board of Works (1855–1900)
  - HQ: Church of St Nicholas, Deptford

Deptford St Nicholas was a civil parish in the metropolitan area of London, England. The creation of the parish accompanied the building of the Church of St Paul's, Deptford, constructed by the Commission for Building Fifty New Churches to meet the demands of the growing population. The ancient parish of Deptford was split in 1730 with the southern part around the new church becoming Deptford St Paul. St Nicholas parish included the old maritime settlement and the dockyard adjacent to the River Thames. Civil parish administration was in the hands of the vestry until 1855 when the parish was grouped into the Greenwich District and the parish elected vestrymen to Greenwich District Board of Works. The parish was transferred from the County of Kent to the County of London in 1889. It became part of the Metropolitan Borough of Greenwich in 1900 and the local authority became Greenwich Borough Council. The civil parish had only nominal existence until 1930 when it was abolished. The area became part of the London Borough of Greenwich in 1965 and following boundary changes in 1994, part of the former parish is now in the London Borough of Lewisham. At the 1921 census (the last before the abolition of the parish), Deptford St Nicholas had a population of 7582.

== Creation ==
Saint Nicholas, Deptford (Parish) Act 1729
- Act of Parliament
- Parliament of Great Britain
- Long title: An Act for providing a Maintenance for the Minister of the new Parish Church of St. Nicholas, Deptford, in the Counties of Kent and Surry; and for making the same a distinct Parish.
- Citation: 3 Geo. 2. c. 33

Dates
- Royal assent: 15 May 1730

It was created in 1730 by an act of parliament, the Saint Nicholas, Deptford (Parish) Act 1729 (3 Geo. 2. c. 33) when the ancient parish of Deptford was split into St Nicholas and St Paul parishes. The split was prompted by the building of a new Church of St Paul by the Commission for Building Fifty New Churches. The ancient parish of Deptford had been divided between Kent and Surrey, but St Nicholas was entirely within the Hundred of Blackheath in Kent.

== Geography ==
St Nicholas was geographically smaller than St Paul and had a much higher population density. It was bounded by the River Thames to the north and Deptford Creek to the east. It consisted of the maritime settlement of Lower Deptford adjacent to the river around Deptford Dockyard.

== Government ==
The parish was governed by a vestry from 1730 to 1855.

The parish was grouped with Greenwich and Deptford St Paul into the Greenwich District in 1855 when it came within the district of the Metropolitan Board of Works. The local authority became Greenwich District Board of Works and the parish elected vestrymen to the authority.

The parish was transferred from the County of Kent to the County of London in 1889 and the Metropolitan Board of Works was replaced by the London County Council.

== Poor law ==
Following the Poor Law Amendment Act 1834 the parish was grouped into the Greenwich Poor Law Union with Greenwich, Deptford St Paul and Woolwich. The parish elected three of the twenty members of the board of guardians. Woolwich left the union in 1868. The union ceased to exist and the parish had no further role in the administration of the poor law following the Local Government Act 1929.

== Abolition ==
The parish became part of the Metropolitan Borough of Greenwich in 1900 and the Greenwich District Board of Works was replaced by Greenwich Borough Council. The civil parish had only nominal existence for administration of the Poor Law until 1 April 1930 when it was abolished to form Borough of Greenwich and borough and parish became aligned. All civil parishes were then abolished in Greater London on 1 April 1965.

The former area of the parish became part of the London Borough of Greenwich in 1965, but following boundary changes in 1994, the former parish is now split between the London Borough of Lewisham and the Royal Borough of Greenwich.

== Population ==
The population of the parish was as follows:

| Year | 1801 | 1811 | 1821 | 1831 | 1841 | 1851 | 1861 | 1871 | 1881 | 1891 | 1901 | 1911 | 1921 |
|---|---|---|---|---|---|---|---|---|---|---|---|---|---|
| Population | 6,933 | 7,085 | 6,337 | 6,036 | 6,953 | 7,071 | ? | 6,474 | 6,941 | 7,321 | 7,901 | 7,290 | 7,582 |
