= Legacy Trust UK =

UK charity, intended to create a legacy from the London 2012 games

Legacy Trust UK was a charitable trust in the United Kingdom, established in 2007 (incorporated 29 November 2006) to support a range of cultural and sporting activities in connection with the 2012 Summer Olympics and 2012 Summer Paralympics in London, with the aim of creating a lasting cultural and sporting legacy from the Games in communities across the UK.

It is registered as a charity in England & Wales, and its objects were "to make awards of money to individuals or organisations for charitable purposes including, without limitation, cultural, educational, healthy sporting and other charitable activities for the benefit of the community in any approved territory."

The Trust was a principal funder of the London 2012 Cultural Olympiad and the London 2012 Festival. It was funding over 100 projects which were part of the Cultural Olympiad, the official cultural celebrations of London 2012, and some of its projects had also been selected to form part of the London 2012 Festival.

Legacy Trust UK had 12 umbrella programmes across England, Northern Ireland, Scotland and Wales as well as four national programmes.

The national programmes are:

- somewhereto, a major youth project which will help young people to access spaces to do things they love doing
- Tate Movie, a film animation project for and by children across the UK, led by Tate and Aardman Animations
- UK School Games, an annual sporting event for talented school-aged athletes
- Community Celebrations, four outdoor events in Northern Ireland, Scotland, the East Midlands and South East England

The charity was funded by a one-off endowment of £40 million from the Big Lottery Fund, Arts Council England and the Department for Culture, Media and Sport, and secured additional funding of more than £40m to fund its programmes.

== See also ==
- LOCOG
- Olympic Delivery Authority
