= Greenwich Dance =

Greenwich Dance is a dance organisation based within the Royal Borough of Greenwich, London.

== History ==
Founded in 1993, Greenwich Dance operated from the Borough Hall until 2018 when it moved to offices within Charlton House.

== Activities ==
Each year, Greenwich Dance produces two festivals as part of the Royal Greenwich Festivals: Greenwich Dances and the Greenwich World Cultural Festival (based at Eltham Palace).

In 2010 Big Dance commissioned Greenwich Dance to act as the Big Dance Hub for the London Boroughs of Bexley, Bromley, Greenwich and Lewisham.

Greenwich Dance is a registered charity, and receives regular funding from Arts Council England and Royal Borough of Greenwich. It was a member of the Arts Council England’s National Portfolio of Organisations until 2018.
