= GSM London =

Coordinates: 51.4781°N 0.0109°W

- London, Greater London; United Kingdom

Information
- Type: Private, for-profit
- Established: 1973 (as Greenwich School of Management)
- Key people: Sir Bob Burgess (Chair); Professor Amanda Blackmore (CEO)
- Colours: White, Black and Red
- Budget: £38.6 million (2016)
- Affiliations: University of Plymouth
- Owner: Sovereign Capital
- Website: www.gsmlondon.ac.uk

GSM London (formerly Greenwich School of Management (GSoM)) was a private provider of higher education based in Greenwich, south-east London, and Greenford, west London. Founded in 1973, it offered business-specific courses at undergraduate and postgraduate levels alongside other specialist training, and catered to a large number of international students. As of 2019, GSM London had educated over 20,000 students. It was owned by the private equity firm Sovereign Capital.

On 30 July 2019, GSM London was placed into administration, and ceased all teaching and student support services by the end of November 2019.

== Courses ==
GSM London offered two-year accelerated courses alongside standard three-year study periods, depending on the course chosen. Foundation-level courses were also available as part of an extended degree programme. It operated three annual intake periods in February, June and October.

Its courses catered to undergraduates, postgraduates, professionals, international students and those looking to improve their English language skills for business or further education. GSM London's specialisms included accounting, finance, economics, human resource management, travel and tourism, digital marketing, as well as LL.B. and MBA degrees.

== Campuses ==
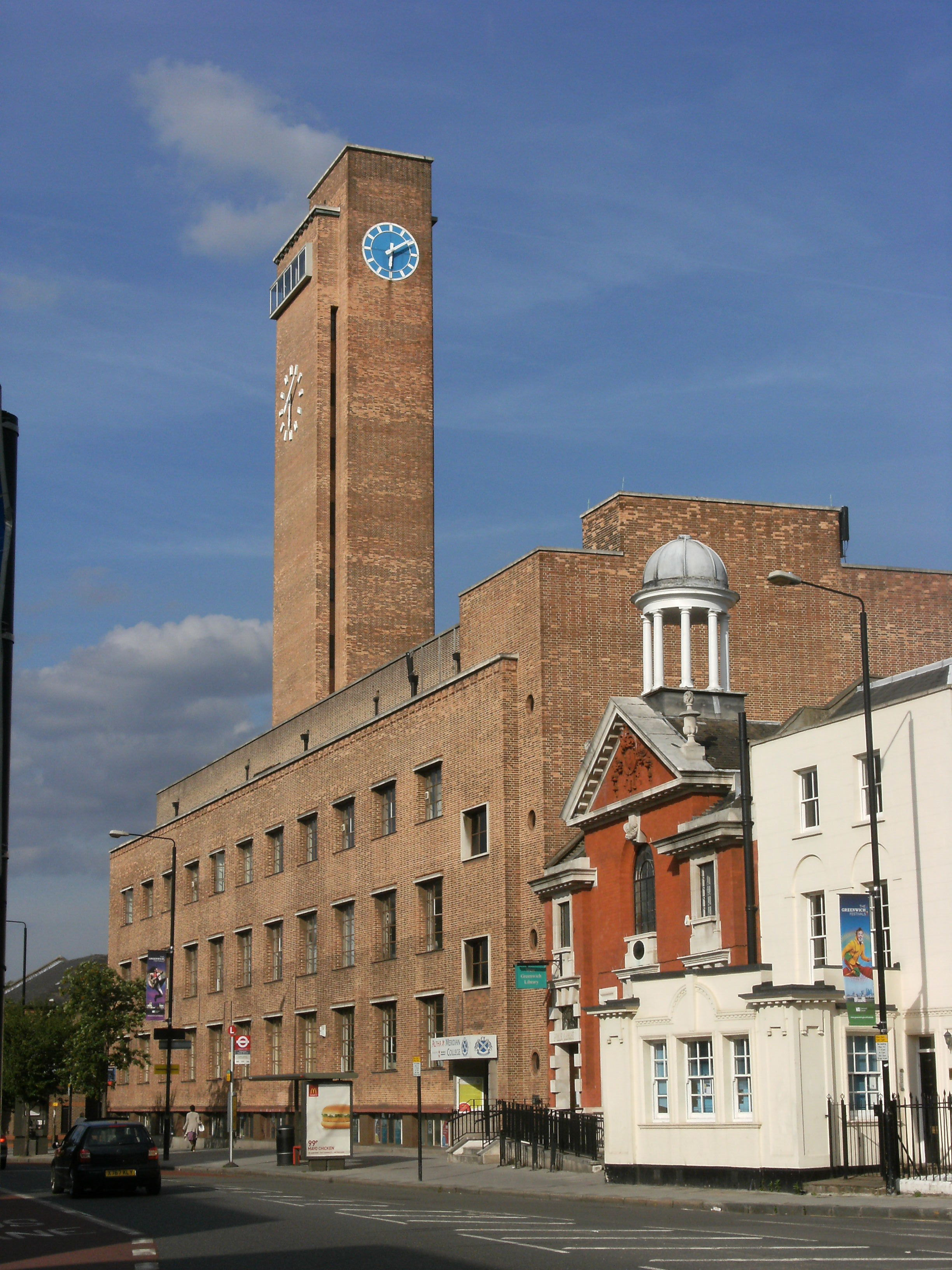
Meridian House, home of GSM London

GSM London operated three campuses across London. Its headquarters was at Meridian House in Greenwich, part of the former Greenwich Town Hall complex. The building has a distinctive brick clock tower and was built in the Art Deco style in 1939.

Another campus opened in Greenford in the London Borough of Ealing, equipped with technologically focused amenities. It also operated at the London Bridge Study Centre in the London Borough of Southwark, close to Borough Underground station and The Shard.

== Partnerships ==
GSM London's degrees were validated and awarded by the University of Plymouth between 2006 and 2019.

The college had no connections with the University of Greenwich, also based in Greenwich.

== Panorama investigation ==
In November 2017 a BBC Panorama investigation uncovered how the third party agents, Future Leaders Academy (FLA), working with GSM, were recruiting bogus students so they could claim student loans they were not entitled to. The investigation also alleged that the agents supplied fraudulent qualifications, offered to sell coursework and were able to "fake attendance". In reaction to the BBC investigation which was broadcast on 13 November 2017, GSM announced that it had immediately suspended their contract with FLA and had instructed external experts to assist the college in an investigation of the matter.

== Administration and closure ==
GSM had capital injections totalling approximately £22m between late 2016 and summer 2019. However the college was not able to recruit and retain sufficient numbers of students to generate enough revenue to be sustainable.

On 30 July 2019, GSM London was placed into administration. All teaching and student support services ceased by the end of November 2019. Existing students were offered the option to transfer to other universities to complete their studies.
