= Metropolitan Borough of Deptford =

Former borough of London, England

Coordinates: 51.4754°N 0.0379°W

Deptford
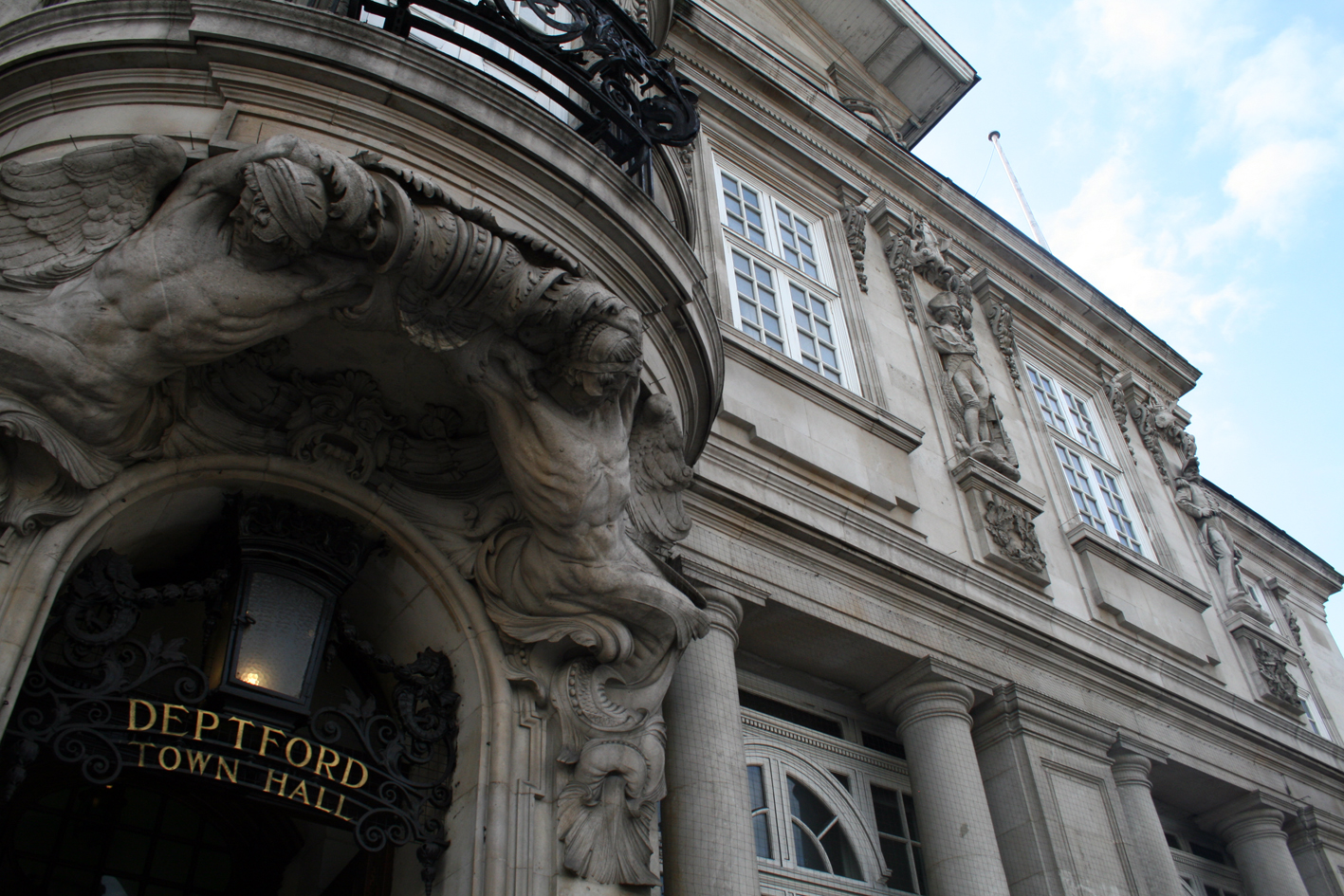
- Deptford Town Hall

- Deptford within the County of London
- Area
  - 1911: 1,563 acres (6.33 km^{2})
  - 1931/1961: 1,564 acres (6.33 km^{2})
- Population
  - 1911: 109,496
  - 1931: 106,891
  - 1961: 68,829
- Density
  - 1911: 70/acre
  - 1931: 68/acre
  - 1961: 44/acre
- History
  - Origin: St Paul Deptford parish
  - Created: 1900
  - Abolished: 1965
  - Succeeded by: London Borough of Lewisham
- Status: Metropolitan borough
- Government: Deptford Borough Council
  - HQ: New Cross Road
- Coat of arms adopted by the borough council
- Map of borough boundary

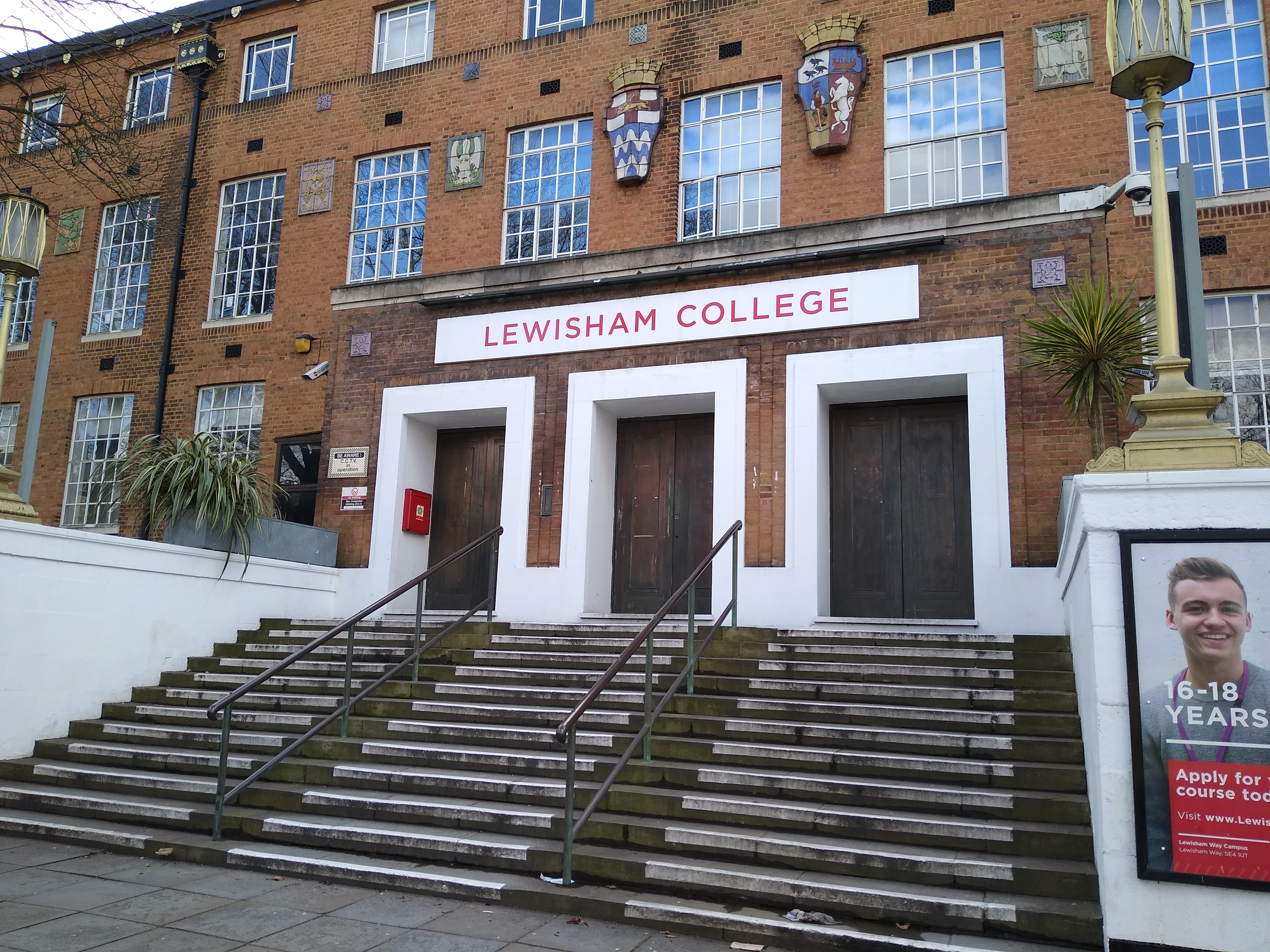
The borough's coat of arms is above the door of Lewisham College's Tressillian Building, built 1927–1931

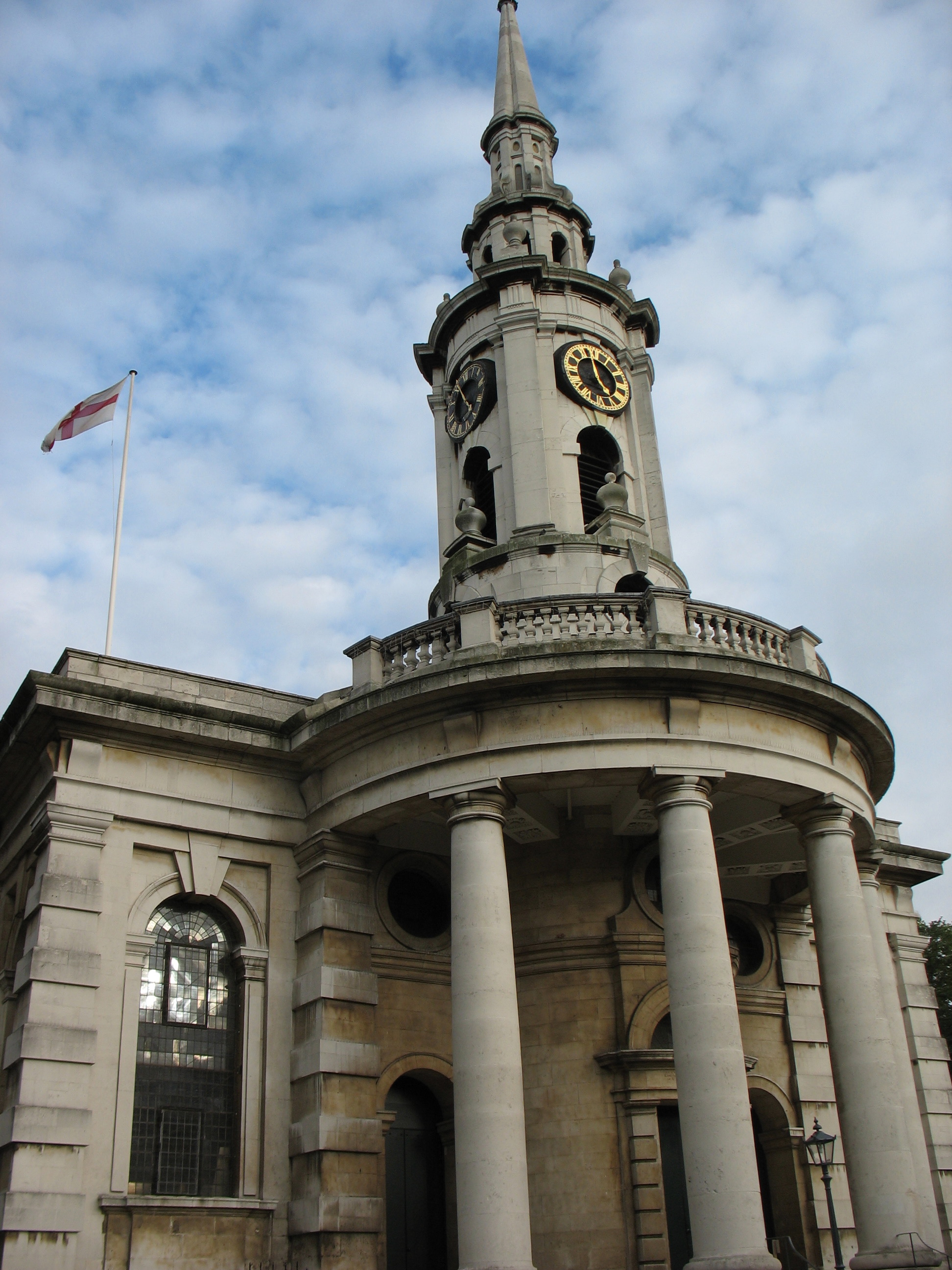
St Paul's, Deptford, one of the finest Baroque churches in the country

The Metropolitan Borough of Deptford was a metropolitan borough in the County of London between 1900 and 1965, when it became part of the London Borough of Lewisham along with the Metropolitan Borough of Lewisham.

== History ==
The borough covered the same area of the parish of Deptford St Paul, which had been separated from the neighbouring parish of Deptford St Nicholas to its north in 1730. The rateable values of the two parishes had been roughly equal when they were separated, but St Paul contained all the farmland to the south, the majority of which was built on over the next 170 years.

When the Metropolitan Borough was created, consideration was given to reuniting the two parishes, but a closer equalisation of rateable value was served by uniting St Nicholas with Greenwich to the east.

The growth of the London conurbation had reached Deptford by the end of the eighteenth century but it had been a large industrial town well before this time: the Royal Docks and the Victualling Yard, which provisioned the Navy, and the various private dockyards, meant it was a prosperous and cosmopolitan town.

Deptford Town Hall was built between 1903 and 1905 on New Cross Road. The building is in a grand baroque style, featuring carvings of tritons and admirals to emphasise Deptford's maritime heritage. It is now used by Goldsmiths College.

== Geography ==
The borough was in south-east London and bordered Bermondsey, Greenwich, Lewisham and Camberwell.

The borough covered an area of 1,563 acres (6.3 km^{2}) and included the localities of St Paul Deptford, Brockley, New Cross, and St Johns.

== Population and area ==
The area of the borough was 1,563 acres (6.3 km^{2}). The population from each census was:

St Paul Deptford Civil Parish 1801–1899

Year	1801	1811	1821	1831	1841	1851	1861	1871	1881	1891
Population	11,349	12,748	14,481	15,314	18,664	24,899	37,834	53,714	76,752	101,286

Metropolitan Borough 1900–1961

Year	1901	1911	1921	1931	1941	1951	1961
Population	110,398	109,496	112,534	106,891		75,495	68,829

== Coat of arms ==
The borough did not have an officially granted coat of arms, instead using a device of their own design.

The three choughs in the first quarter represent the county of Surrey. They were taken from the arms of Onslow family, one-time lords of the manor of Guildford. The fourth quarter showed a white horse on red, representative of the county of Kent. Before 1889 the area of the borough was divided between the two counties. The second quarter showed a quarter ship on the stocks, for the naval dockyard. The remaining quarter of the shield was a portrait of Peter the Great of Russia, who learnt the art of naval architecture in Deptford.

Above the shield was a mural crown, representing municipal government. On either side was an heraldic dolphin entwining a trident.

== Politics ==
A map showing the wards of Deptford Metropolitan Borough as they appeared in 1916.

Under the Metropolis Management Act 1855 any parish that exceeded 2,000 ratepayers was to be divided into wards; as such the parish of St Paul Deptford was divided into four wards (electing vestrymen): No. 1 or North (15), No. 2 or South (21), No. 3 or East (18) and No. 4 or West (18).

The metropolitan borough was divided into six wards for elections: East, North West, North, South East, South West and South.

=== Parliament constituency ===
For elections to Parliament, the borough was represented by one constituency:

- Deptford
