= School Games =

British school sports competition

The School Games (formerly known as UK School Games) is an annual sporting competition for elite school-age athletes in the United Kingdom that began in 2006.

The event was based on an Olympic Games model, with multiple sports events held across an intensive four-day period. The Games were organised by the Youth Sport Trust, sponsored by Sainsbury's, and from 2008 received funding from Legacy Trust UK, a charitable trust set up to ensure that the 2012 Summer Olympics generate a lasting legacy across the UK.

In 2011, 1,600 elite school-aged athletes participated in the event across twelve sports: athletics, badminton, cycling, fencing, gymnastics, hockey, judo, rugby sevens, swimming, table tennis, volleyball, and wheelchair basketball.

== Locations ==
=== UK School Games ===
- 2006 — Glasgow
- 2007 — Coventry
- 2008 — South West England (Bristol and Bath)
- 2009 — Wales (Cardiff, Newport and Swansea)
- 2010 — North East England (Newcastle, Gateshead and Sunderland)
- 2011 — Sheffield

=== School Games ===
- 2012 — London
- 2013 — Sheffield
- 2014 — Manchester
- 2015 — Manchester
- 2016 — Loughborough
- 2017 — Loughborough

== Changes in 2012 ==
=== Name change ===
Following the 2011 UK School Games, the event changed its name to the School Games.

=== Format change ===
The structure of the event also changed from previous years. The UK School Games was an annual event for the most talented school-age athletes, whereas the new School Games is a year-round, inclusive sports competition that’s designed to get young people of all ages and abilities enjoying the benefits of competitive sport. There is a new pyramid structure in place and school-aged pupils will compete at four levels:

- Level 1 – Intra-school competition
- Level 2 – Local inter-school competition
- Level 3 – Annual area school games festival
- Level 4 – National multi-sport event

The number of sports involved in the games will also increase to around 30.

== 2012 School Games ==
The 2012 School Games started in September 2011 and culminated in the national event being held in May 2012 in London. The four-day national event took place across a range of sporting venues around London, with the final day of action set in the Olympic Park in Stratford using some key Olympic 2012 venues, including the main stadium.

== See also ==
- 2012 Summer Olympics
- 2012 Paralympic Games
- Youth Olympic Games
- Commonwealth Youth Games
