= Royal Hill, Greenwich =

Street in Greenwich, London

Coordinates: 51.47666°N 0.00944°W

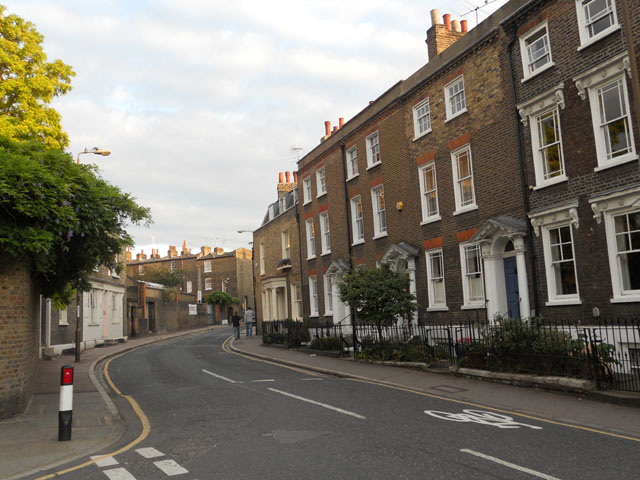
Townhouses on Royal Hill.

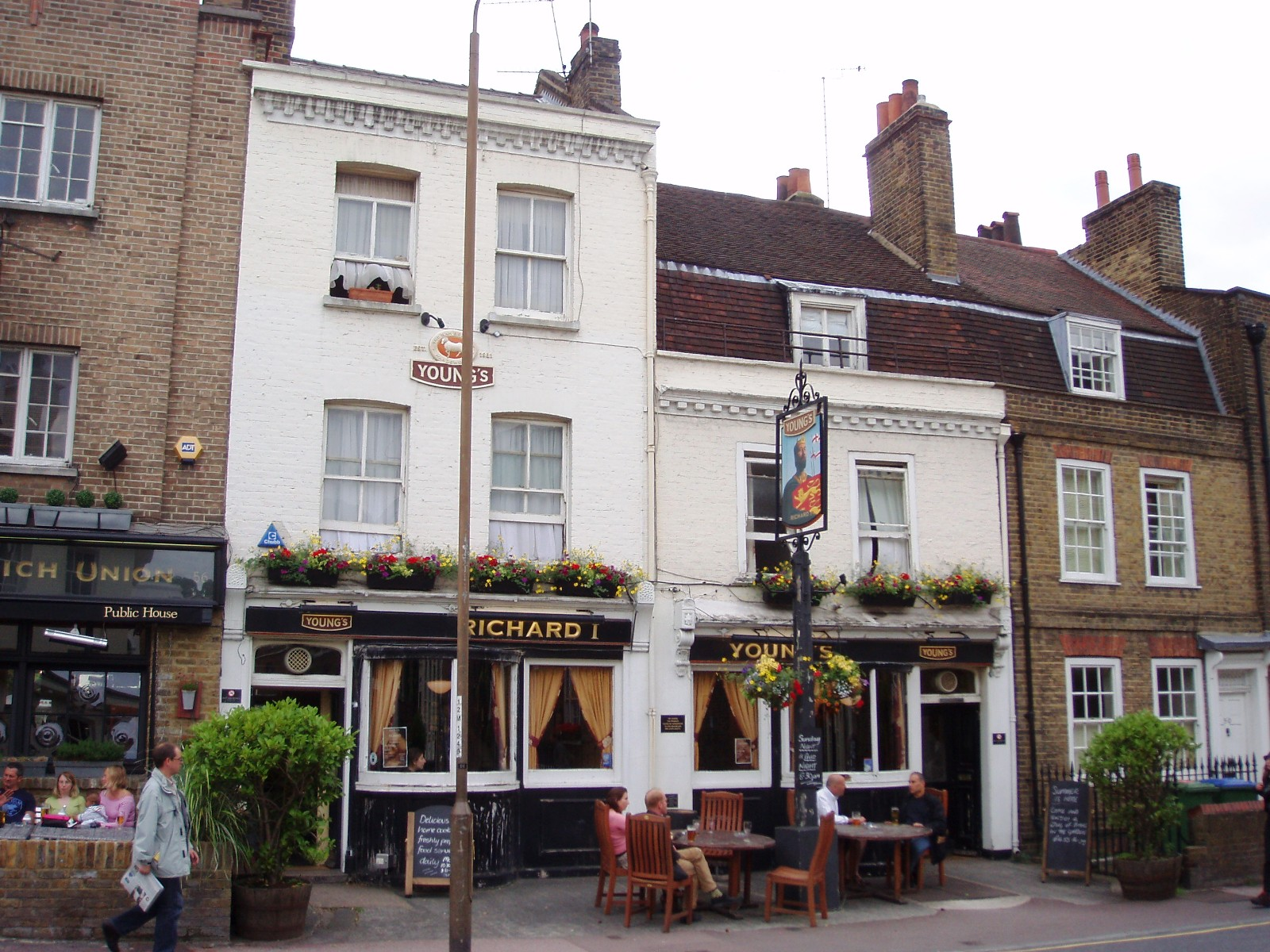
The Richard the First pub, roughly halfway along the street.

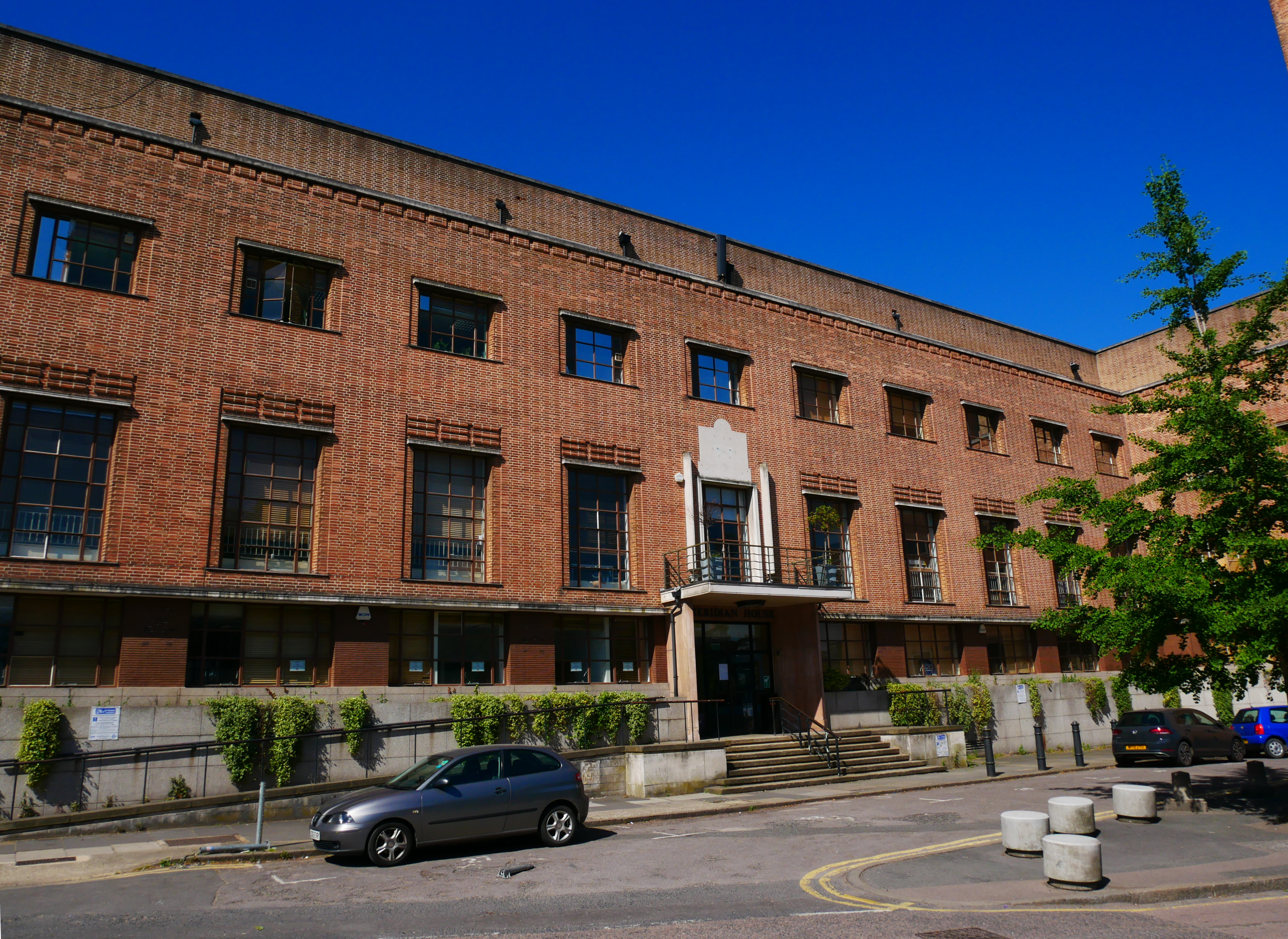
Greenwich Town Hall facing onto Royal Hill.

Royal Hill, Greenwich is a mainly residential street, approximately 0.7 km (0.4 mi) long, in Greenwich in South London. It runs uphill off Greenwich High Road in a southwards curve and then westwards to meet Greenwich South Street. At the northern end of the road is Greenwich Town Hall, a 1939 Art Deco building designed by Clifford Culpin. A number of Georgian era houses are located along the road. The Pevsner Guide describes much of the road as "the usual suburban expansion" which was "filling in between the more scattered eighteenth century houses". Royal Hill was once the name of the entire hill rather than just the street, and so other roads in the area are historically referred to as Royal Hill, including Point Hill which ascends south towards Blackheath.

== See also ==
- Croom's Hill, located nearby

== Bibliography ==
- Cherry, Bridget & Pevsner, Nikolaus. London 2: South. Yale University Press, 2002.
- Hamilton, Nigel. Royal Greenwich: A Guide and History to London's Most Historic Borough. Greenwich Bookshop, 1969.
