= Woolwich Town Hall =

Municipal building in London, England

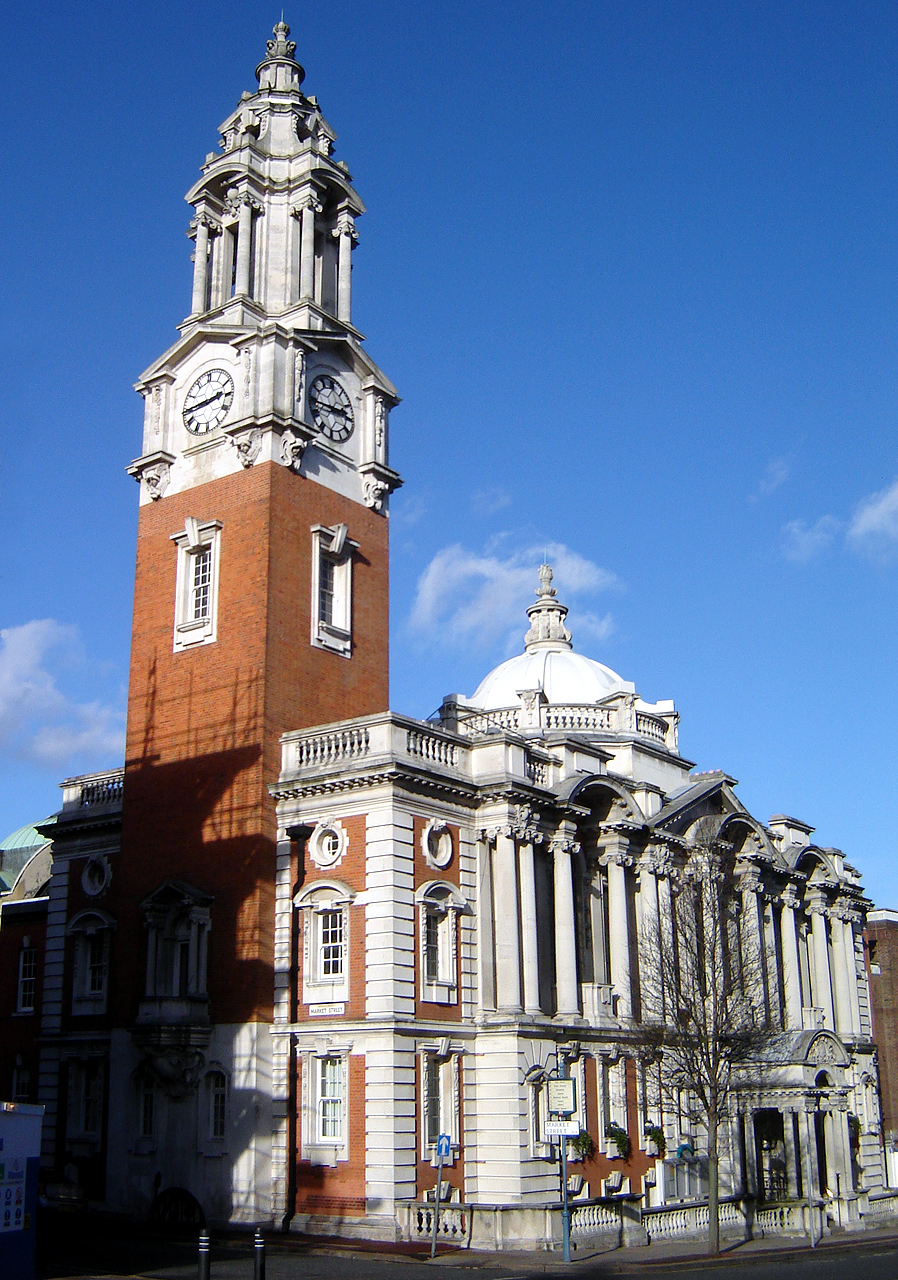
- Woolwich Town Hall

- Shown in Greenwich
- 51°29′22.56″N 0°3′52.76″E
- Location: Woolwich

History
- Built: 1906

Site notes
- Architect: Brumwell Thomas
- Architectural style: Edwardian Baroque style

Listed Building – Grade II*
- Designated: 8 June 1973
- Reference no.: 1289668

Woolwich Town Hall is an early 20th-century town hall located in the historic Bathway Quarter in the centre of Woolwich, South East London. Until 1965 it was the seat of local government of the Metropolitan Borough of Woolwich, after which it became the headquarters of the Greenwich London Borough Council. It is a rare example of an Edwardian Baroque town hall in London and is a Grade II*-listed building.

The Town Hall is also the register office for the borough.

== History ==
Initially, the improvement commissioners for Woolwich, then a civil parish in the County of Kent, met in a room next to the poorhouse and in the parish church of St Mary Magdalene. The first town hall in Woolwich was built in around 1839, but was almost immediately sold to the Metropolitan Police.

A second town hall was built in Calderwood Street in 1842. In 1855 the Metropolis Management Act provided every parish in the metropolitan area with its own local administration. In 1889 the parish of Woolwich became part of the newly formed County of London and in 1900 the Metropolitan Borough of Woolwich was formed from the parishes of Woolwich, Plumstead and Eltham. This prompted the construction of a larger and more representative town hall, although the old town hall still survives.

Construction on the current building, the third town hall, started in 1903. New buildings for the County and Magistrates' Court, as well as a new police station and the existing library, formed a small administrative quarter. The architect, Alfred Brumwell Thomas, apparently submitted an earlier design, rejected in a 1902 competition for Deptford Town Hall. The construction was undertaken by Messrs J E Johnson & Son at a cost of £80,000.

The official opening of the town hall took place, without royal presence at the insistence of Woolwich Council, in January 1906. Instead Labour MP Will Crooks did the opening speech, while the first bishop of Woolwich, John Leeke blessed the building. Between 1929 and 1930 a small annexe was added in Polytechnic Street. Across Wellington Street the Municipal Offices were built in the 1930s.

The Metropolitan Borough of Woolwich was abolished in 1965 and largely merged with Greenwich (a small section north of the Thames went to the London Borough of Newham). Woolwich Town Hall became the seat of local government of the new London Borough of Greenwich.

Peggy Middleton House, which had provided extra office space in Woolwich New Road since 1977, was demolished in 2009.

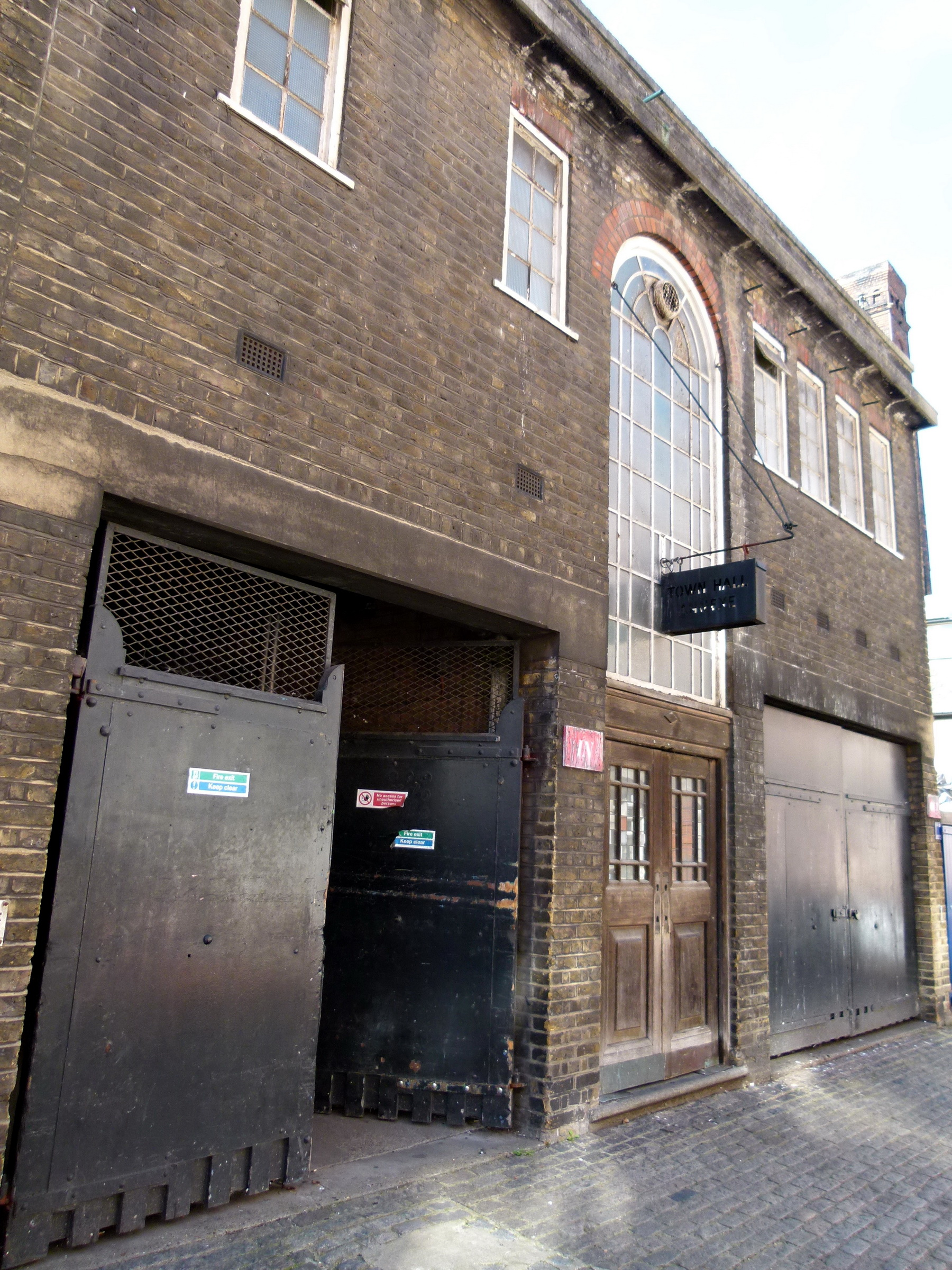
Woolwich Town Hall Annexe

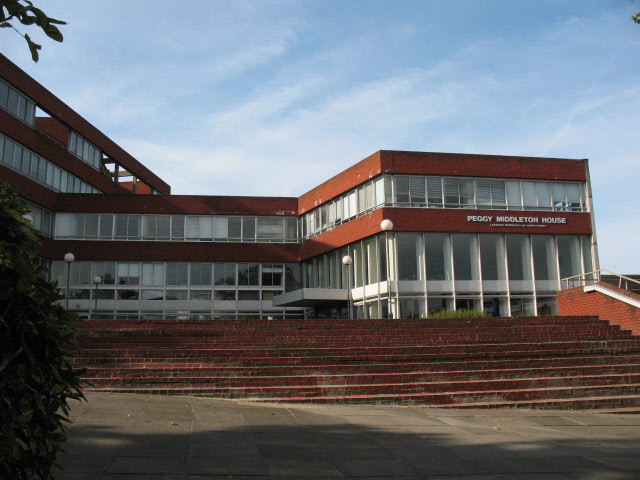
Peggy Middleton House

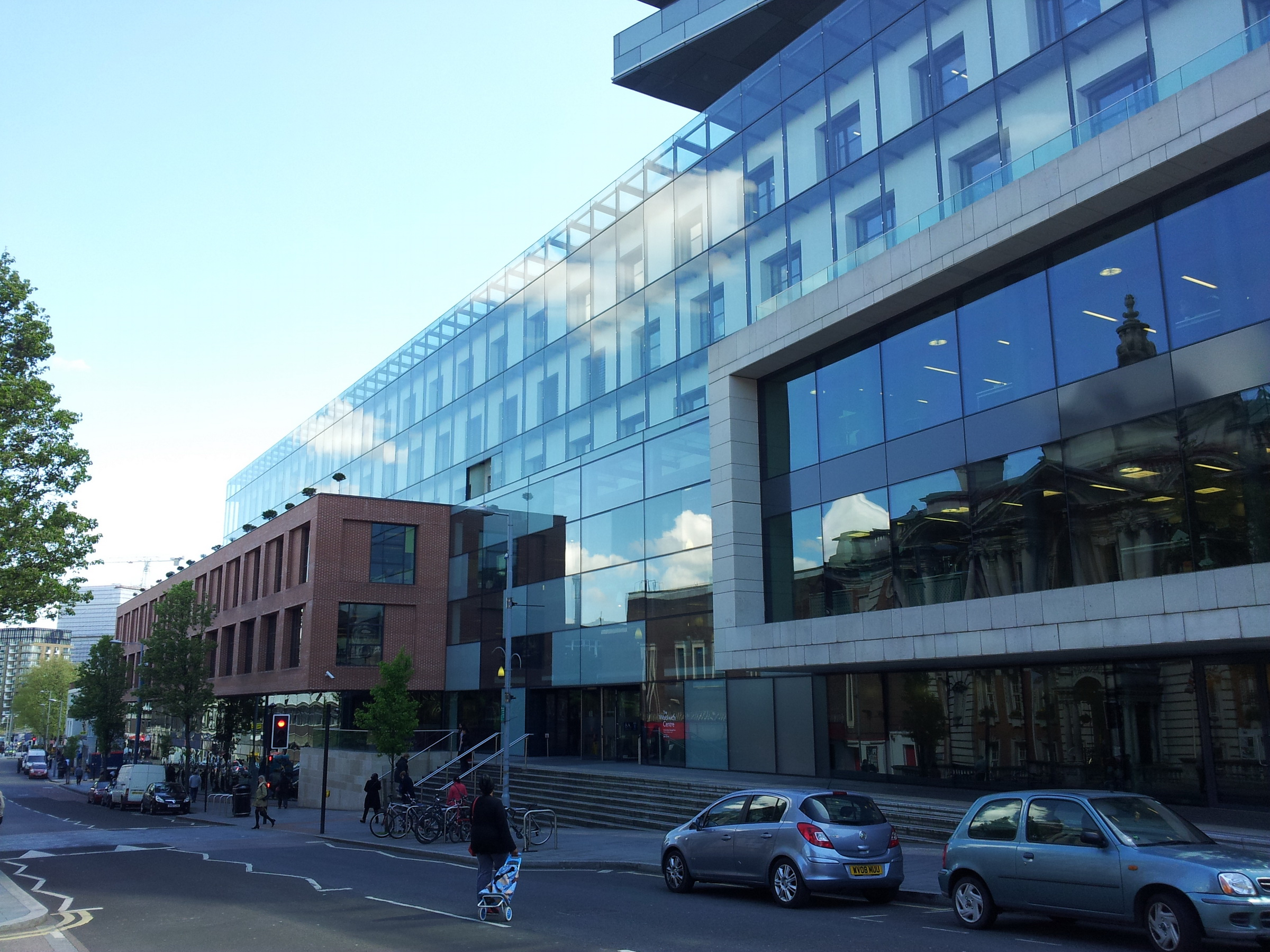
The Woolwich Centre

== Architecture ==
=== Exterior ===
Woolwich Town Hall was designed by the architect Alfred Brumwell Thomas, who more or less simultaneously worked on (more ambitious) plans for Belfast City Hall (1898–1906) and Stockport Town Hall (1905–1908). It is a fine example of Edwardian Baroque in the London area. The building has two monumental façades along Wellington Street and Market Street. The Wellington Street façade features an imposing entrance of Portland stone with a colonnade and "broken" pediments. The other entrance on Market Street is decorated with military and maritime symbols. The Italianate clock tower, on the corner of the two streets, is 40 m tall. It contains a clock by John Smith & Sons of Derby; there are no bells. The six domes, four made of copper, that make up the roof can be seen from afar.

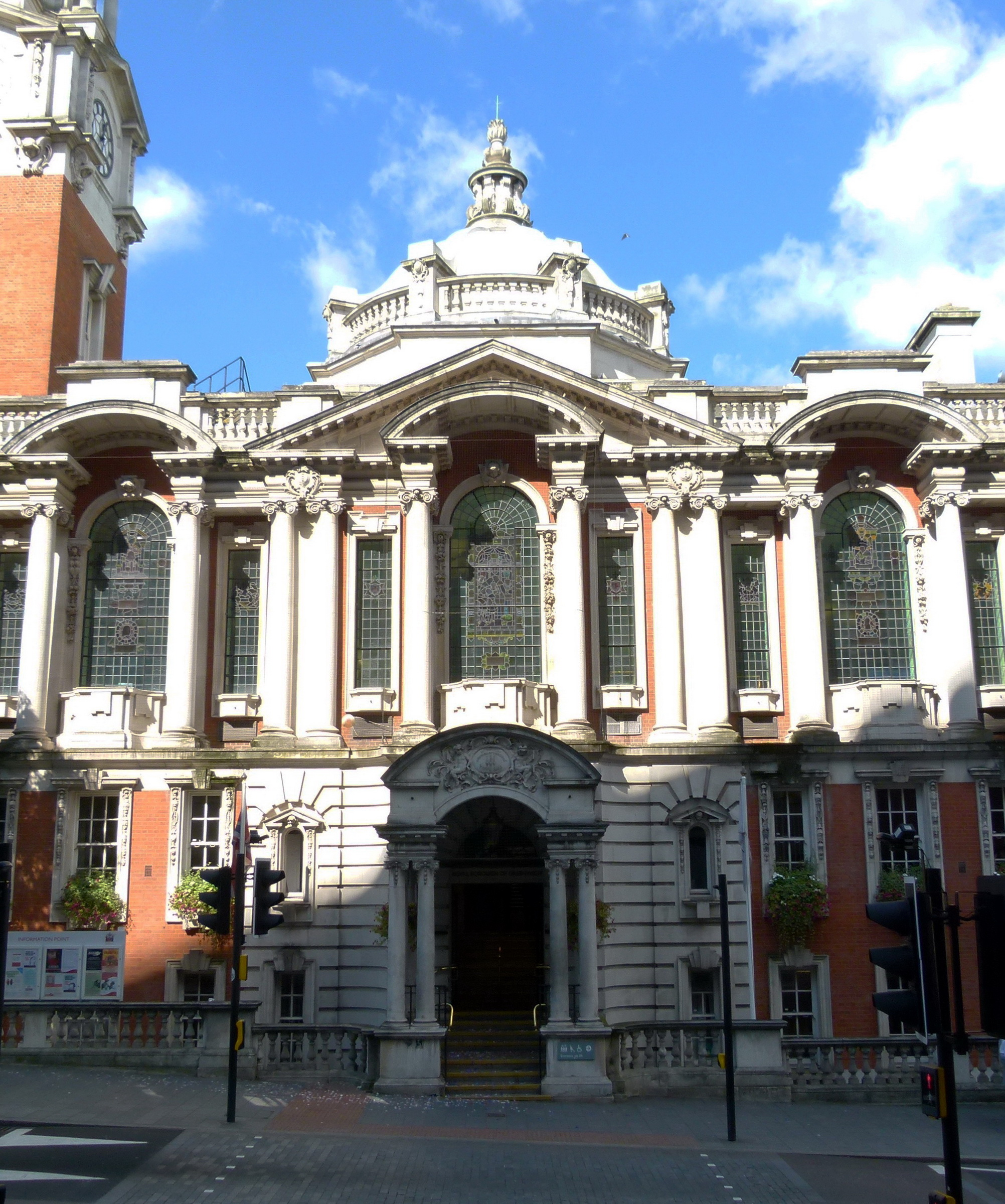
Wellington Street entrance

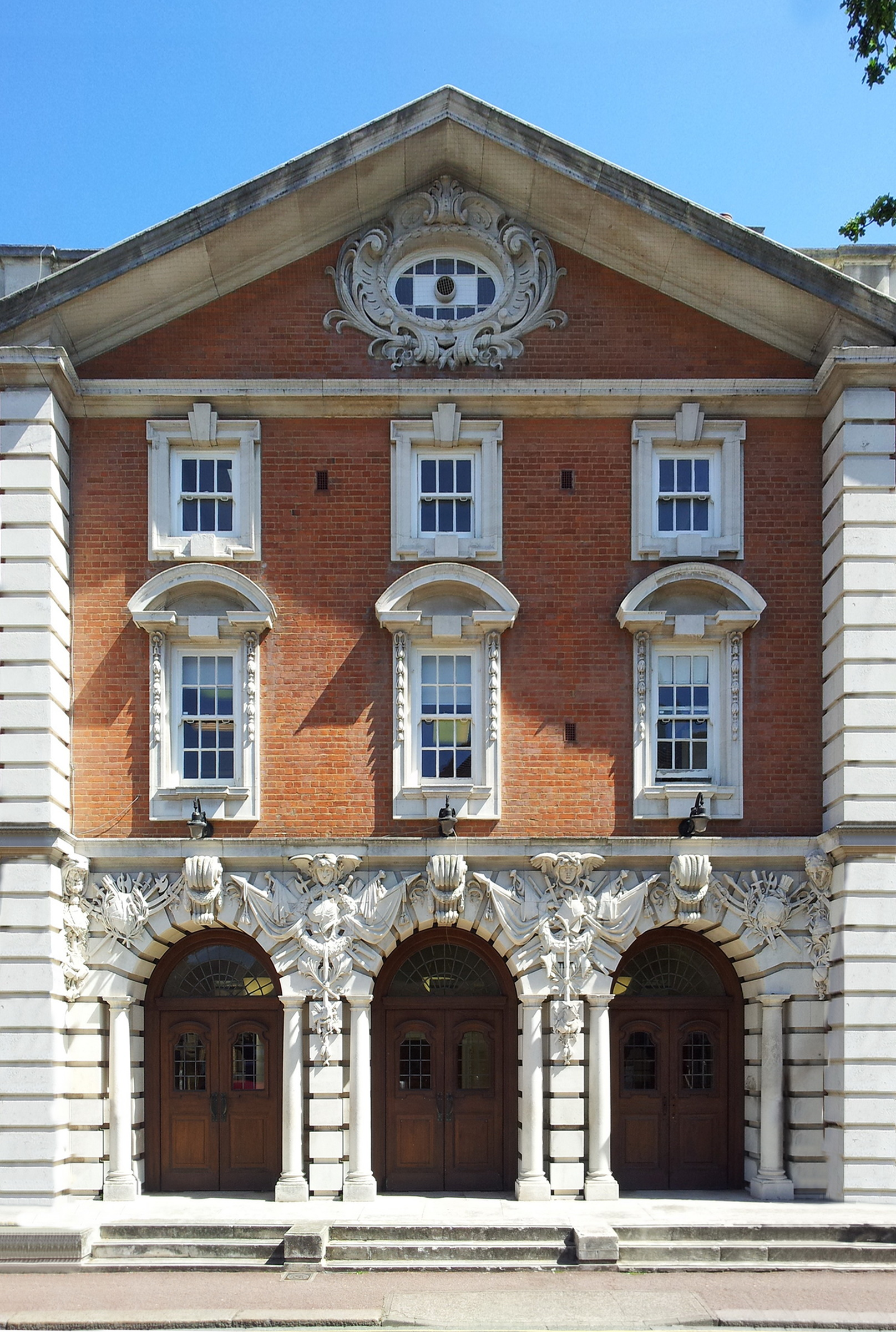
Market Street entrance

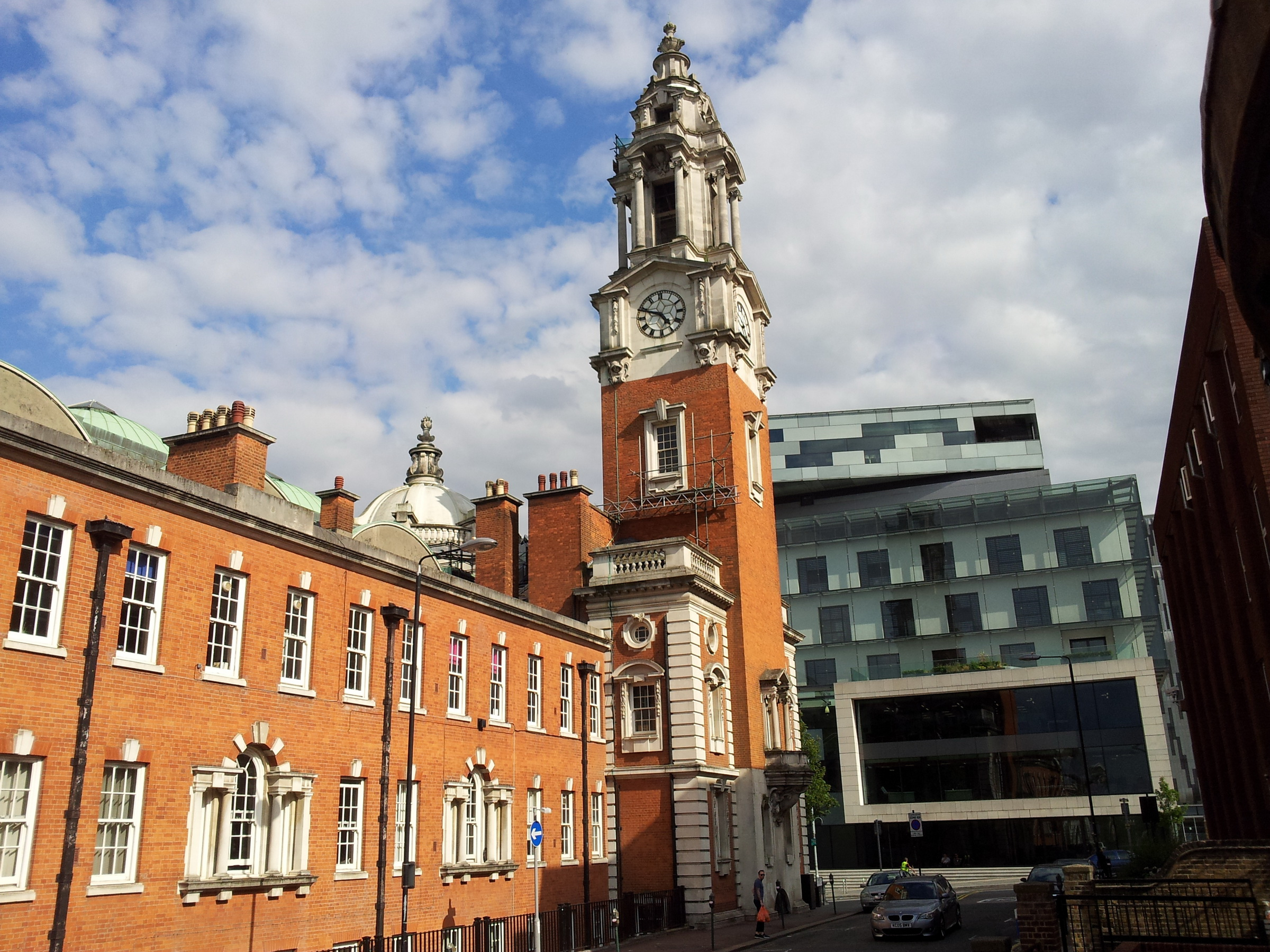
Market Street façade

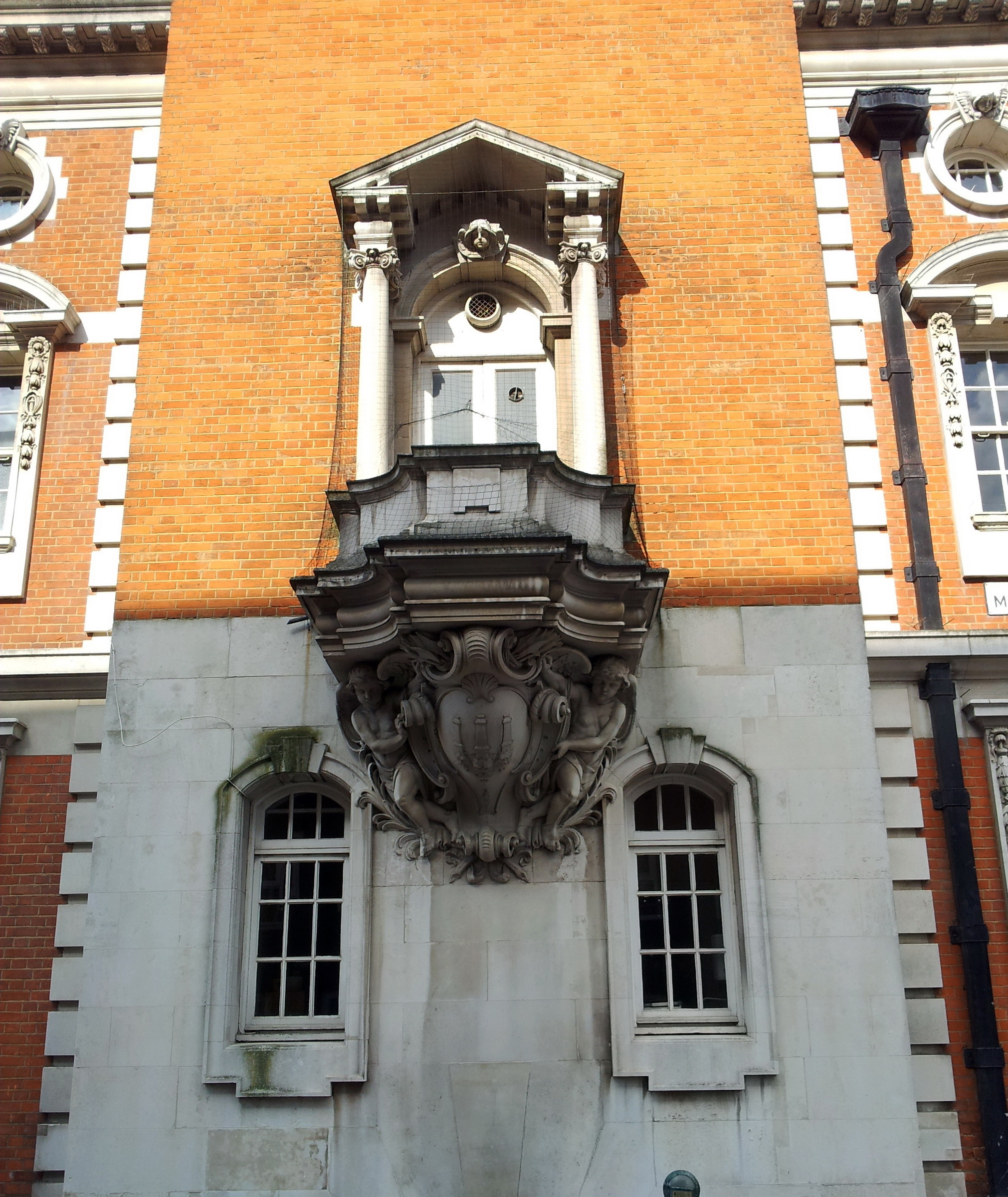
Detail clocktower

=== Interior ===
The Wellington Street entrance leads directly into Victoria Hall. This large space is dominated by a tall marble statue of Queen Victoria by F. W. Pomeroy, a stone copy of the bronze Statue of Queen Victoria in Chester. On both sides of the stairs bronze World War II memorial plaques were placed. The hall is also used for exhibitions and for counting votes during elections. In the centre of the building, accessed via the Market Street entrance, is a public hall, seating 750 people. The hall has a large dome that provides daylight. Stained-glass windows throughout the building depict historic events in the parishes of Woolwich, Plumstead and Eltham, for example the entertaining of three foreign kings in Eltham Palace in 1374, the launching of the ship Henry Grace à Dieu at Woolwich Dockyard in 1514, and portraits of Thomas More, Margaret Roper and Samuel Pepys. The windows date from 1904 and are the work of Geoffrey Webb. Elsewhere in the building fine woodcarving and plasterwork can be admired.

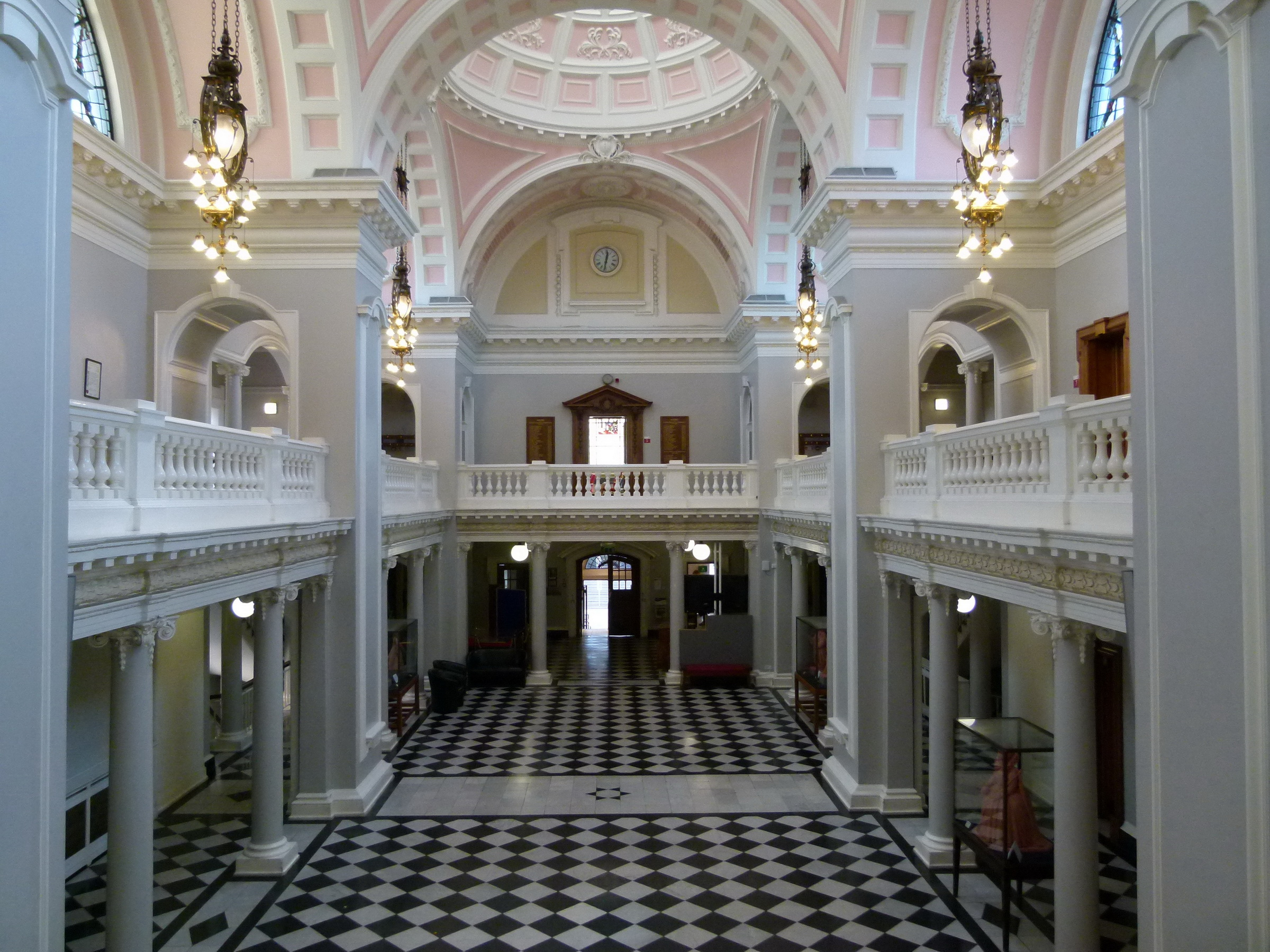
Victoria Hall

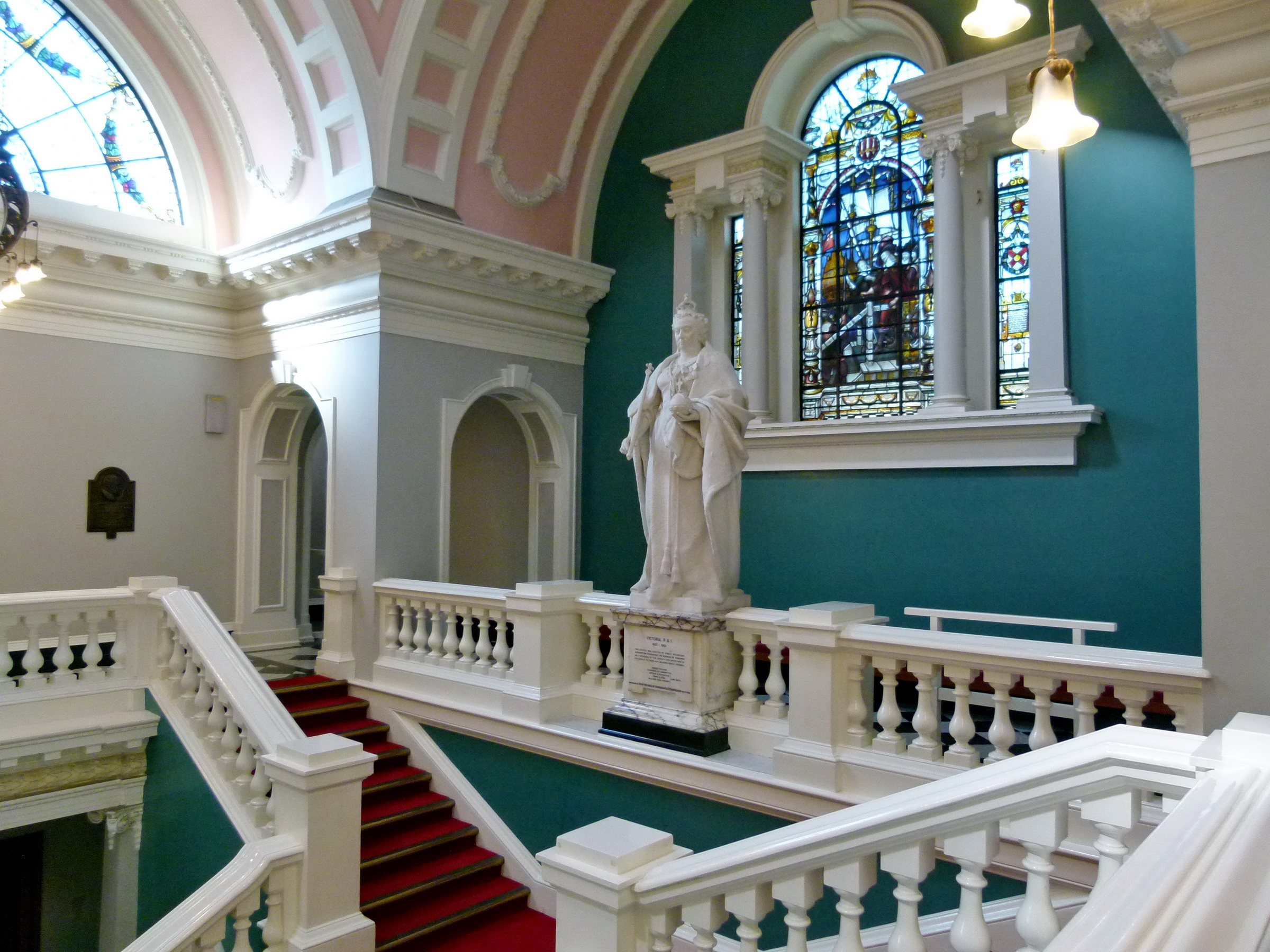
Staircase and statue

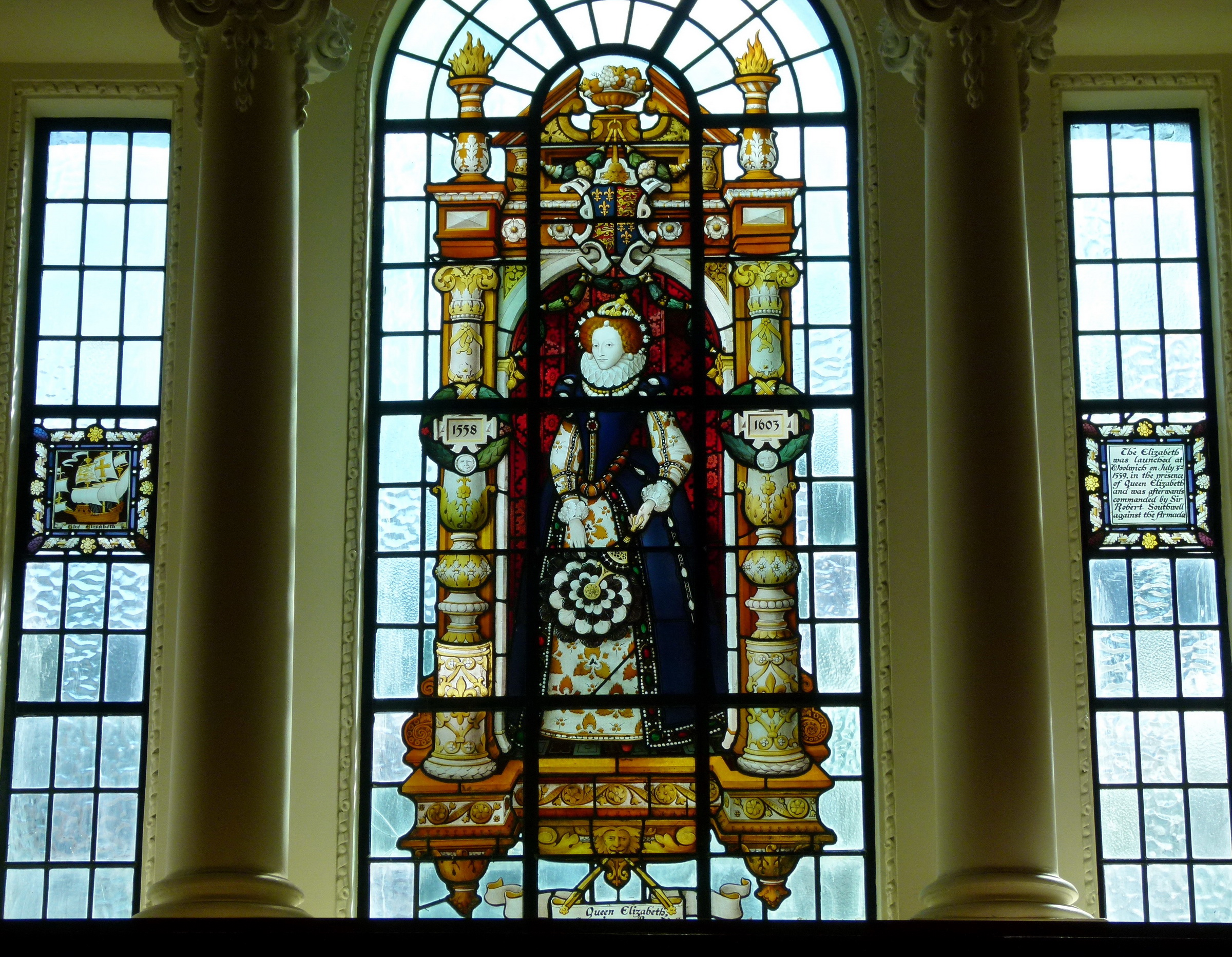
Stained-glass window

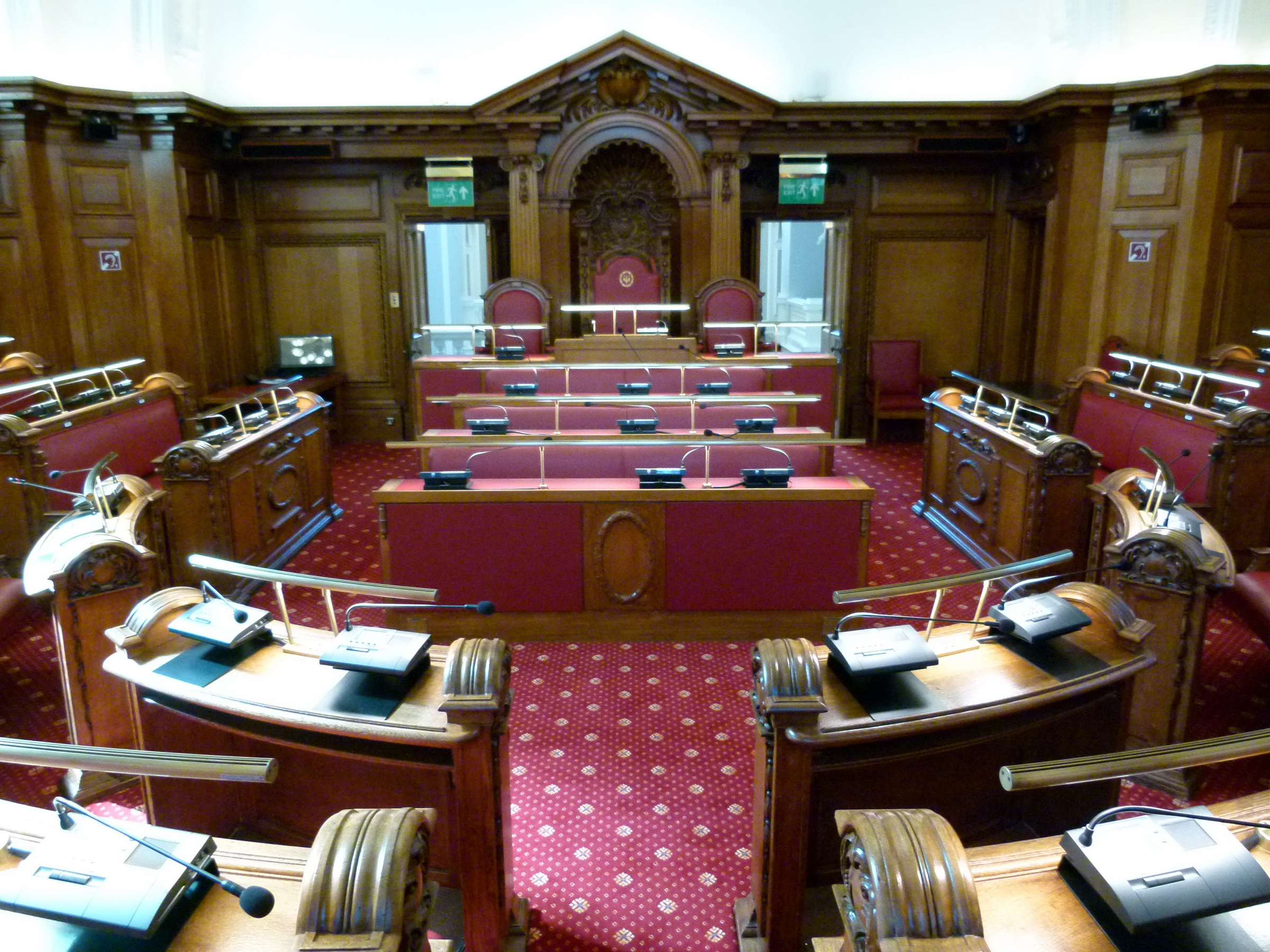
Council Room

== Sources ==
- Saint, Andrew; Guillery, Peter (2012). Woolwich – Survey of London (PDF). Vol. 48. London: Yale University Press. ISBN 978-0300187229.
