= Listed buildings at the University of Leeds =

Historic structures in West Yorkshire, England

The campus of the University of Leeds contains a number of listed buildings from tombstones in the former Woodhouse Cemetery (now called St George's Field) through Gothic revival buildings such as the Great Hall to the Brutalist Roger Stevens building.

Listed buildings at the University of Leeds
Name (Wikidata entry)	Location	Completed	Architect	Heritage designation (Date of listing)	Notes	Grid ref Geo-coordinates	Image	National Heritage List for England entry	Commons category
27 and 29 Lyddon Terrace (Q26655940)	University of Leeds Campus	1851		Grade II listed building (5 August 1976)		SE2910134635; 53°48'25.931"N, 1°33'34.481"W		1375121	
Leeds Fire Brigade Memorial (Q26547680)	St George's Fields	1892		Grade II listed building (5 August 1976)		SE2929334862; 53°48'33.235"N, 1°33'23.911"W		1256138	
Emmanuel Church (Q26262654)	Leeds	1880	Adams & Kelly	Grade II listed building (26 September 1963)		SE2958634616; 53°48'25.218"N, 1°33'7.978"W		1255637	Emmanuel Centre, University of Leeds
38, Hyde Terrace (Q26655837)	Leeds	1857		Grade II listed building (11 September 1996)		SE2913634302; 53°48'15.149"N, 1°33'32.681"W		1375014	
Highfield Villa (Q26655843)	University of Leeds Campus	1857		Grade II listed building (11 September 1996)		SE2915234289; 53°48'14.724"N, 1°33'31.813"W		1375021	
School Of Education (Q26681798)	University of Leeds Campus	1852		Grade II listed building (11 September 1996)		SE2959134531; 53°48'22.468"N, 1°33'7.733"W		1255932	
Beech Grove House (Q26234696)	University of Leeds Campus	1799		Grade II listed building (5 August 1976)		SE2935434635; 53°48'25.816"N, 1°33'20.754"W		1256283	Beech Grove House, University of Leeds
Hopewell House (Q26547233)	Leeds	1847		Grade II listed building (11 September 1996)		SE2971434511; 53°48'21.794"N, 1°33'1.015"W		1255659	
Former Lodges To Woodhouse Cemetery (Q26547678)	St George's Fields	1835	John Clark	Grade II listed building (26 September 1963)		SE2930434878; 53°48'33.750"N, 1°33'23.303"W		1256136	Woodhouse Cemetery Lodges
Botany House (Q26262131)	University of Leeds Campus	1825		Grade II listed building (5 August 1976)		SE2942034632; 53°48'25.769"N, 1°33'17.046"W		1256277	Botany House, University of Leeds
University of Leeds School of Education building (Q26547166)	University of Leeds Campus	1872		Grade II listed building (11 September 1996)		SE2955434536; 53°48'22.637"N, 1°33'9.752"W		1255587	
Trinity Congregational Church (Q26547231)	Woodhouse		George Francis Danby	Grade II listed building (5 August 1976)		SE2966434567; 53°48'23.616"N, 1°33'3.730"W		1255657	Trinity Congregational Church, Leeds
11 and 13 Lyddon Terrace (Q26655935)	University of Leeds Campus	1825		Grade II listed building (5 August 1976)		SE2907234580; 53°48'24.156"N, 1°33'36.086"W		1375116	
School Of Education (Q26547165)	University of Leeds Campus	1861		Grade II listed building (11 September 1996)		SE2957034536; 53°48'22.633"N, 1°33'8.878"W		1255586	
Cemetery Wall With Blocked Gateway On North West Side (Q26547679)	St George's Fields	1836	John Clark	Grade II listed building (11 September 1996)		SE2925334892; 53°48'34.214"N, 1°33'26.086"W		1256137	
Former Cemetery Chapel And Statue Of Michael Sadler (Q26547717)	St George's Fields	1835	John Clark	Grade II listed building (26 September 1963)		SE2929434796; 53°48'31.100"N, 1°33'23.879"W		1256177	Cemetery Chapel, Woodhouse Cemetery
Gate piers & garden wall to 38 Hyde Terrace (Q26655838)	University of Leeds Campus	1857		Grade II listed building (11 September 1996)		SE2905034220; 53°48'12.514"N, 1°33'37.411"W		1375015	
University of Leeds Geography Annexe (Q26655914)	University of Leeds Campus	circa 1849		Grade II listed building (11 September 1996)		SE2920034675; 53°48'27.205"N, 1°33'29.056"W		1375095	
Hostel of the Resurrection (Q17565116)	Leeds	1908	Temple Lushington Moore	Grade II* listed building (26 September 1963)	listed as Adult Education Centre	SE2911834372; 53°48'17.280"N, 1°33'33.660"W		1256039	Department of Continuing Education, University of Leeds
Springfield House (Q26655844)	Leeds			Grade II listed building (26 September 1963)		SE2928734282; 53°48'14.472"N, 1°33'24.437"W		1375022	
Parkinson Building (Q7138541)	University of Leeds Campus	1950	Thomas Arthur Lodge	Grade II listed building (19 January 1988)		SE2955434715; 53°48'28.8"N, 1°33'10.8"W		1255638	Parkinson Building, University of Leeds
21 Lyddon Terrace (Q26655938)	University of Leeds Campus	1839		Grade II listed building (5 August 1976)		SE2909034621; 53°48'25.481"N, 1°33'35.089"W		1375119	
Clarendon House (Q26655897)	Leeds			Grade II listed building (11 September 1996)		SE2919334197; 53°48'11.740"N, 1°33'29.603"W		1375078	
Edward Boyle Library (Q24571869)	University of Leeds Campus	1975	Chamberlin, Powell and Bon	Grade II listed building (10 June 2010)		SE2941234382; 53°48'22.118"N, 1°33'17.269"W		1393835	Edward Boyle Library, University of Leeds
Garstang Building (Q26252986)	University of Leeds Campus	1968	Chamberlin, Powell and Bon	Grade II listed building (10 June 2010)		53°48'16.038"N, 1°33'19.721"W		1393835	Garstang Building, University of Leeds
Senior Common Room (Q105691102)	University of Leeds Campus	1966	Chamberlin, Powell and Bon	Grade II listed building (10 June 2010)		SE2922734432; 53°48'18.562"N, 1°33'22.097"W		1393835	
E.C. Stoner Building (Q26237205)	University of Leeds Campus	1968	Chamberlin, Powell and Bon	Grade II listed building (10 June 2010)		SE2945934458; 53°48'19.336"N, 1°33'9.414"W		1393835	E.C. Stoner Building, University of Leeds
Irene Manton Building (Q26262656)	University of Leeds Campus	1969	Chamberlin, Powell and Bon	Grade II listed building (10 June 2010)		SE2931434360; 53°48'16.189"N, 1°33'17.374"W		1393835	Irene Manton Building, University of Leeds
Mathematics and Earth Sciences Building (Q105691496)	University of Leeds Campus	1965	Chamberlin, Powell and Bon	Grade II listed building (10 June 2010)		53°48'19.746"N, 1°33'18.695"W		1393835	Maths/ Earth and Environment building, University of Leeds
Computing Building (Q105691823)	University of Leeds Campus	1971	Chamberlin, Powell and Bon	Grade II listed building (10 June 2010)		53°48'20.477"N, 1°33'15.134"W		1393835	IT Services building, University of Leeds
15, 17 And 19, Lyddon Terrace (Q26655937)	University of Leeds Campus	1839		Grade II listed building (5 August 1976)		SE2908834615; 53°48'25.286"N, 1°33'35.201"W		1375118	
Clothworkers' Hall (Q26262154)	University of Leeds Campus	1879		Grade II listed building (5 August 1976)		SE2949834481; 53°48'21.438"N, 1°33'12.784"W		1255691	Clothworkers Centenary Concert Hall
Gate Piers And Wall To Adult Education Centre (Q26547545)	University of Leeds Campus	circa 1908		Grade II listed building (11 September 1996)		SE2914734383; 53°48'17.766"N, 1°33'32.054"W		1255997	
7 And 9, Lyddon Terrace (Q26655934)	University of Leeds Campus	circa 1839		Grade II listed building (5 August 1976)		SE2907134574; 53°48'23.962"N, 1°33'36.144"W		1375115	
University of Leeds Staff Social Club (Q26655913)	University of Leeds Campus	1849		Grade II listed building (11 September 1996)		SE2918034686; 53°48'27.565"N, 1°33'30.146"W		1375094	
Great Hall of the University of Leeds (Q5599287)	University of Leeds Campus	1894	Alfred Waterhouse	Grade II listed building (8 October 1970)		SE2943134679; 53°48'27.252"N, 1°33'16.369"W		1255826	Great Hall, University of Leeds
Baines Wing (Q26234194)	University of Leeds Campus	1877–1912	Alfred Waterhouse, Paul Waterhouse	Grade II listed building (8 October 1970)		SE2943134679; 53°48'26.968"N, 1°33'13.327"W		1255826	Baines Wing, University of Leeds
1-8, Woodsley Terrace (Q26547186)	University of Leeds Campus	1856		Grade II listed building (24 October 1995)		SE2905934481; 53°48'20.956"N, 1°33'36.832"W		1255607	
Agricultural Sciences Building (Q112127194)	University of Leeds Campus	1923	Paul Waterhouse	Grade II listed building (11 September 1996)		SE2923734706; 53°48'28.282"N, 1°33'27.223"W		1255827	
Monuments north of Cemetery Chapel (Q26547683)	St George's Fields	1849–1921		Grade II listed building (5 August 1976)	A group of four monuments dating between 1849 and 1921.	SE2930434812; 53°48'31.615"N, 1°33'23.324"W		1256141	
30 And 32, Hyde Terrace (Q26655840)	University of Leeds Campus	1840		Grade II listed building (5 August 1976)		SE2919434263; 53°48'13.874"N, 1°33'29.524"W		1375017	
Facade to burial vaults (Q26547677)	St George's Fields	1834	John Clark	Grade II listed building (11 September 1996)		SE2930534780; 53°48'30.582"N, 1°33'23.281"W		1256135	
Leeds Grammar School Chapel (Q26656019)	University of Leeds Campus	1868	Edward Middleton Barry	Grade II listed building (5 August 1976)		SE2907734700; 53°48'28.037"N, 1°33'35.744"W		1375208	Former Leeds Grammar School chapel
1A, Cavendish Road (Q26547260)	University of Leeds Campus			Grade II listed building (11 September 1996)		SE2957334587; 53°48'24.282"N, 1°33'8.698"W		1255689	
Number 3 Stead House (Q26547251)	University of Leeds Campus	1821		Grade II listed building (5 August 1976)		SE2950834361; 53°48'16.981"N, 1°33'12.326"W		1255679	
Gate Piers And Boundary Wall To Woodsley Terrace (Q26655927)	University of Leeds Campus	1856		Grade II listed building (24 October 1995)		SE2904334472; 53°48'20.668"N, 1°33'37.710"W		1375108	
23 and 25 Lyddon Terrace (Q26655939)	University of Leeds Campus	1839		Grade II listed building (5 August 1976)		SE2909634630; 53°48'25.769"N, 1°33'34.758"W		1375120	
A Celebration Of Engineering Sciences (Q26677526)	Mechanical Engineering building	1963	Allan Johnson	Grade II listed building (19 January 2016)		SE2937334924; 53°48'35.298"N, 1°33'19.534"W		1429226	Mural on Mechanical Engineering building, University of Leeds
Monuments north of east end of Cemetery Chapel (Q26547682)	St George's Fields	1837–1894		Grade II listed building (5 August 1976)	A group of four monuments dating between 1837 and 1894.	SE2931134796; 53°48'31.097"N, 1°33'22.946"W		1256140	
Boundary Wall With Gate Piers And Gates To Trinity Congregational Church (Q26547232)	Leeds	1898	George Francis Danby	Grade II listed building (11 September 1996)		SE2966434554; 53°48'23.195"N, 1°33'3.733"W		1255658	
Old Mining Building (Q26262664)	University of Leeds Campus	circa 1932	Henry Vaughan Lanchester, Thomas Arthur Lodge	Grade II listed building (19 January 1988)		SE2947034845; 53°48'32.652"N, 1°33'14.238"W		1255654	Old Mining Building, University of Leeds
Leeds Grammar School (Q26656016)	University of Leeds Campus	1858	Edward Middleton Barry	Grade II listed building (5 August 1976)		SE2903634718; 53°48'28.638"N, 1°33'37.994"W		1375205	
Walls, Railings And Gates To Leeds Grammar School (Q26656020)	University of Leeds Campus	1858		Grade II listed building (11 September 1996)		SE2905434730; 53°48'29.012"N, 1°33'37.019"W		1375209	
Monuments east of Cemetery Chapel (Q26547681)	St George's Fields	1845–1873		Grade II listed building (5 August 1976)	A group of four monuments dating between 1845 and 1873.	SE2930034804; 53°48'31.360"N, 1°33'23.548"W		1256139	
Gates and piers south east Of Beech Grove House (Q26547817)	University of Leeds Campus	19th century		Grade II listed building (5 August 1976)		SE2939434614; 53°48'25.193"N, 1°33'18.472"W		1256288	
Hubert Dalwood Mural Relief (Q26676261)	Stage@Leeds	1959	Hubert Dalwood	Grade II listed building (30 October 2012)	Originally installed at Boddington Hall (a university hall of residence), the work was restored and moved to the campus when Boddington Hall was demolished in 2013.	SE2938034550; 53°48'23.116"N, 1°33'19.249"W		1412199	
Henry Price Building (Q26262655)	University of Leeds Campus	1964	Chamberlin, Powell and Bon	Grade II listed building (10 June 2010)		SE2917934805; 53°48'31.979"N, 1°33'29.848"W		1393837	Henry Price Residences, University of Leeds
Roger Stevens Building (Q17533992)	University of Leeds Campus	1970	Chamberlin, Powell and Bon	Grade II* listed building (10 June 2010)		SE2943134378; 53°48'17.640"N, 1°33'16.524"W		1393836	Roger Stevens Building, University of Leeds
Gatehouse To Devonshire Hall (Q26656135)	Headingley	19th century		Grade II listed building (11 September 1996)		SE2876435862; 53°49'5.696"N, 1°33'52.495"W		1375333	
Coach House And Stables To Oxley Hall (Q26547322)	Weetwood	circa 1865	John Winter Simpson	Grade II listed building (11 September 1996)		SE2725037839; 53°50'9.949"N, 1°35'14.640"W		1255756	
Oxley Hall (Q26547320)	Weetwood	circa 1861	John Winter Simpson	Grade II listed building (11 September 1996)		SE2724437807; 53°50'8.916"N, 1°35'15.007"W		1255754	
Coach House at Devonshire Hall (Q26656134)	Headingley	19th century		Grade II listed building (11 September 1996)		SE2868435941; 53°49'8.270"N, 1°33'56.840"W		1375332	Coach House at Devonshire Hall
Semi-detached houses, Devonshire Hall (Q26656136)	Headingley	19th century		Grade II listed building (11 September 1996)		SE2873135818; 53°49'4.282"N, 1°33'54.313"W		1375334	
Lodge, Walls And Gate Piers To Oxley Hall (Q26547324)	Weetwood	1860–1865	John Winter Simpson	Grade II listed building (11 September 1996)		SE2731437846; 53°50'10.162"N, 1°35'11.144"W		1255758	
Devonshire Hall (Q26262155)	Headingley	1928	John Proctor, Frederick Charlton	Grade II listed building (11 September 1996)		SE2871735871; 53°49'6.917"N, 1°33'54.022"W		1375323	Devonshire Hall, University of Leeds
Old Hall, Devonshire Hall (Q26656129)	Headingley	19th century		Grade II listed building (11 September 1996)		SE2868935848; 53°49'5.261"N, 1°33'56.599"W		1375325	
