= Brotherton Library =

Library at the University of Leeds, England

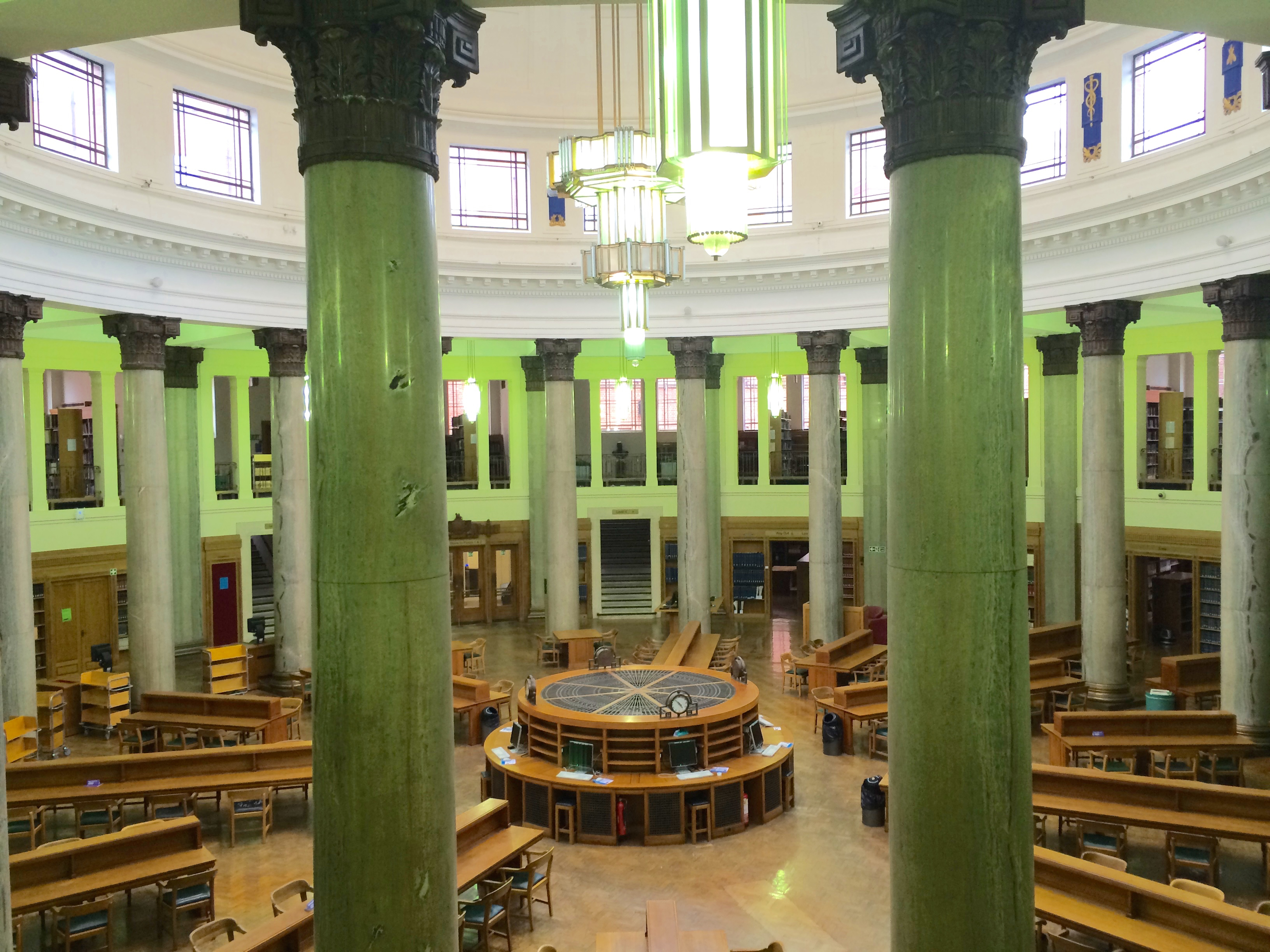
- Main reading room at the Brotherton Library
- 53°48′29″N 1°33′12″W
- Location: Woodhouse Lane, Leeds, England
- Established: 1936

Other information
- Director: Masud Khokhar
- Website: library.leeds.ac.uk
- Building details

General information
- Type: Library
- Architectural style: Mix of Neoclassicism and Art Deco
- Construction started: 1930
- Completed: 1936

Design and construction
- Architects: Lanchester & Lodge
- Designations

Listed Building – Grade II

The Brotherton Library is a 1936 Grade II listed Neoclassical building with some art deco fittings, located on the main campus of the University of Leeds. It was designed by the firm of Lanchester & Lodge, and is named after Edward Brotherton, 1st Baron Brotherton, who in 1927 donated £100,000 to the university as funding for its first purpose-built library.

The Brotherton Library is a hub in what has become Leeds University Library. Initially, it contained all of the university's books and manuscripts, with the exception of books housed in the separate Medical Library and Clothworkers' (Textile) Library. As of 2022 it contains the main collections in arts and languages and the Special Collections' Research Centre, and it houses part of the University Library's administration. Science, engineering and social science research collections are located in the Edward Boyle Library, while the Laidlaw Library contains core texts for undergraduates and a high demand collection and the Health Sciences Library contains the University Library's medical and related collections, with a small satellite library at St James's University Hospital. The University Library is also responsible for the University Archives, the Stanley and Audrey Burton Gallery, the Treasures of the Brotherton Gallery and the International Textile Collection.

== Before the Brotherton ==
The predecessor of the Brotherton was a library located in the undercroft of College Hall, an 1894 building of the Yorkshire College, which was founded as the Leeds School of Medicine in 1831. The college became part of the Victoria University in 1887, and College Hall became the Great Hall of the University of Leeds when the university received its royal charter in 1904.

Fanny Passavant (1849-1944), the first Librarian of the college and subsequently of the university, retired in 1919. At that point, the library contained approximately 65,000 volumes, but the Great Hall's undercroft had long been full and the overflow of books had been distributed around the campus. Passavant's successor, Dr Richard Offor, was charged with the task of building a new University Library, and Lord Brotherton agreed to fund it. Brotherton laid the building's foundation stone in 1930, but died later in the same year. His collection of some 80,000 rare books and manuscripts was given to the university in 1936, along with an endowment to enable appropriate purchases to be made in the future. A suite of rooms to house the Brotherton Collection formed part of the new Brotherton Library.

The undercroft of the Great Hall now houses the University Archives, which are managed by the library.

== Architecture and building history ==
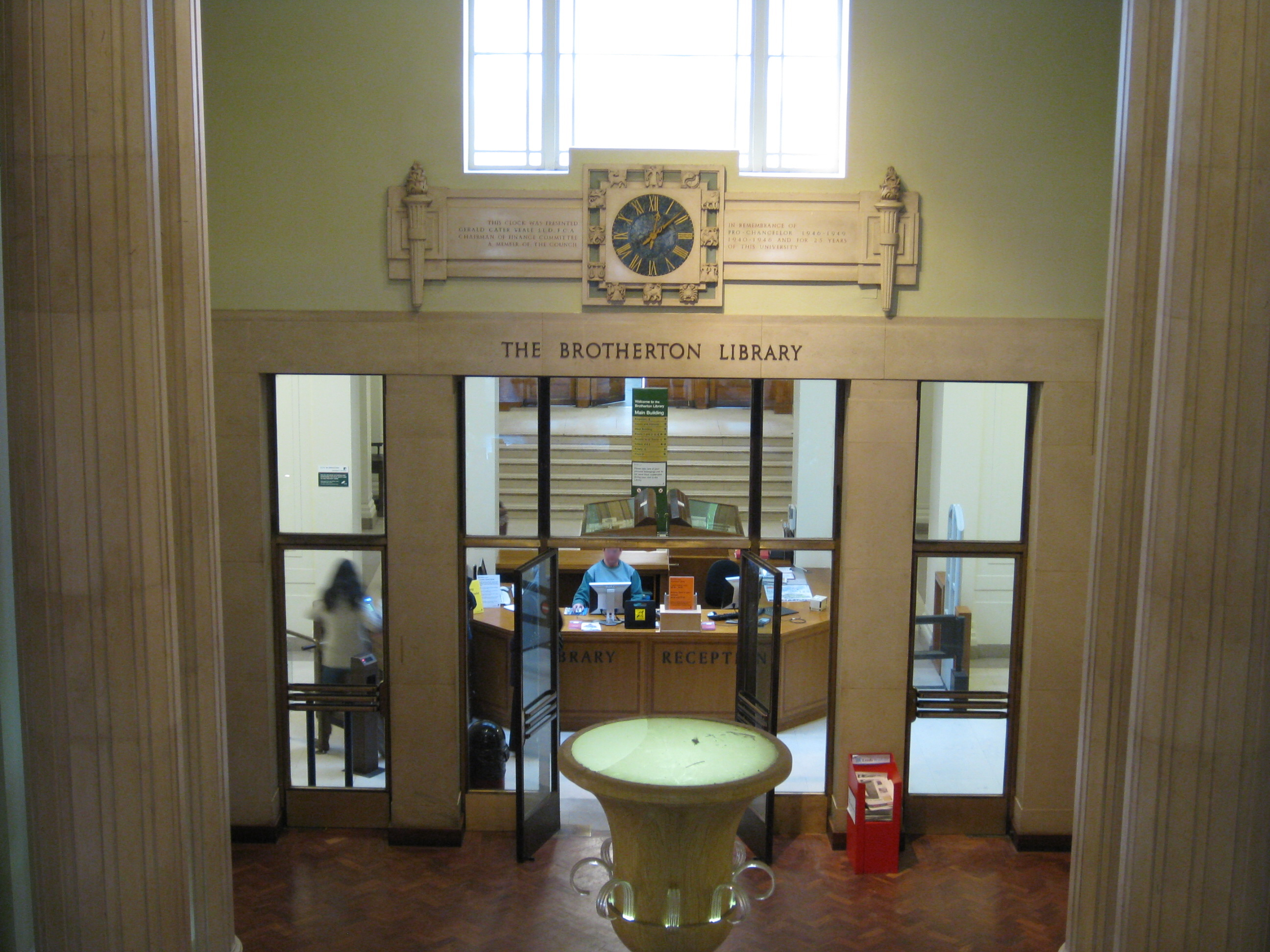
Entrance from the Parkinson Building

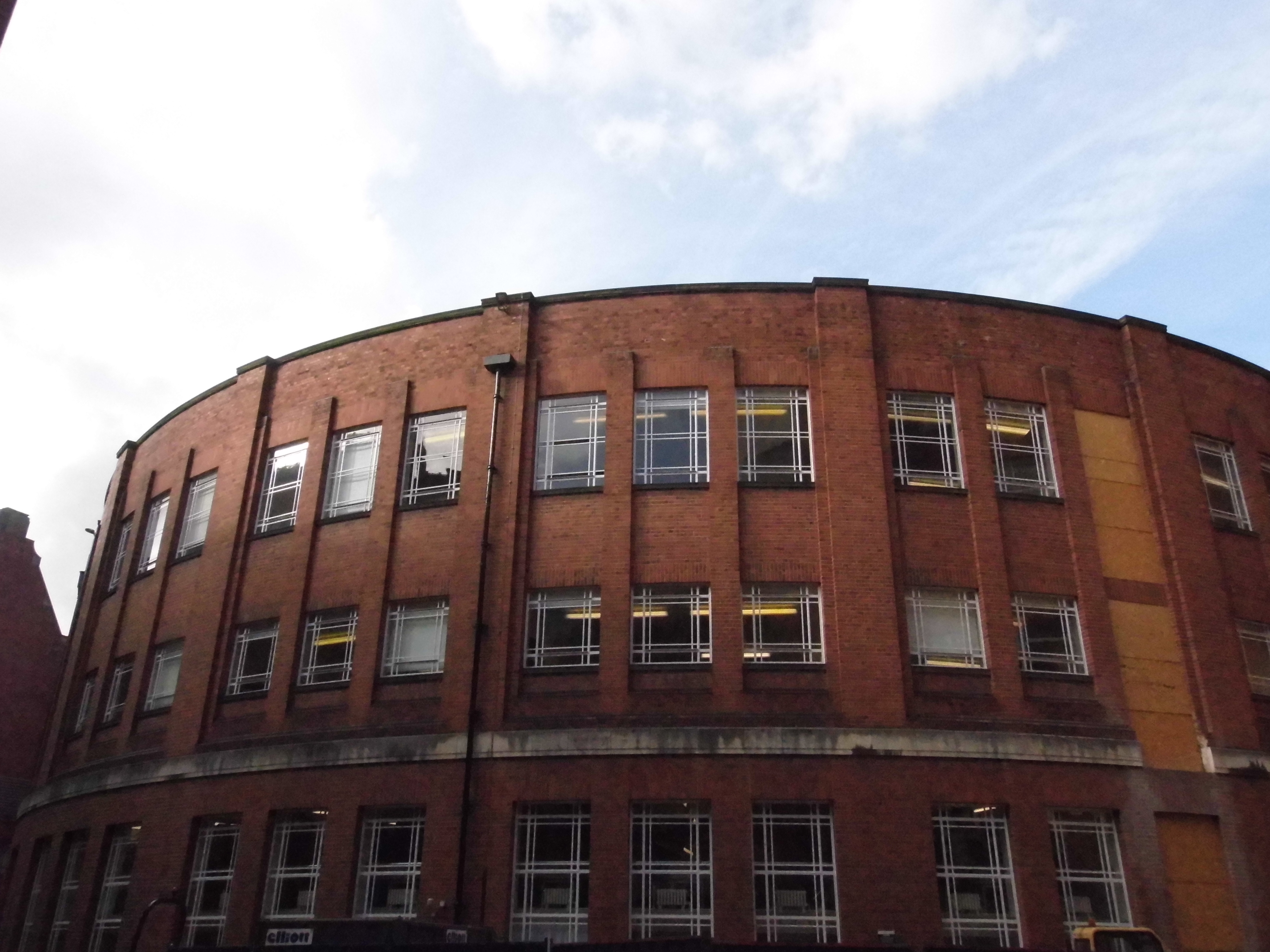
The exterior of the Brotherton Library; largely obscured by the Parkinson Building

In the 1920s, the university had initiated an Architectural Prize Scheme in order to provide architecture worthy of the institution's increasing prestige. In 1927, the firm of Henry Vaughan Lanchester, Thomas Geoffry Lucas and Thomas Arthur Lodge ("Lanchester, Lucas & Lodge") was selected to provide "a monumental Beaux-Arts composition which would completely obscure from the outside world all the existing regrettable Waterhouse buildings with grand red brick and Portland stone". The new buildings, started in 1929, were initially to consist of a Chemistry and Engineering building (opened in 1932) the Brotherton Library (opened in 1936) and the Parkinson Building (opened, eventually, after World War II, in 1950). Lucas had left the firm in 1930, so the new university buildings and a number of later ones, up to 1964, were credited to Lanchester & Lodge.

The façades of the Chemistry and Parkinson buildings, facing the main road, are of Portland stone, but the exterior of the Brotherton Library is of unadorned red brick. The reason for this was that it was to be accessed through the Parkinson Building, and there was no reason for it to have a Portland stone exterior when the library would not be easily visible. However, the delay in the Parkinson's construction, initially because of a shortage of funding, meant that the Brotherton's plain exterior was on view for fourteen years.

The contrast between the exterior and the interior of the Brotherton could not be greater. Through the glass doors leading from the Parkinson Building into the library, a small entrance hall with a short flight of steps leads up to swing doors which open on to a large cylindrical space surmounted by a concrete dome. The diameter of the room, 160 feet (49 m), was deliberately made wider than the 140 feet (43 m) of the British Museum Reading Room, on which it was modelled. Twenty columns of green Swedish marble, each comprising three drums weighing three tons each, support the coffered dome. Eighteen marble columns were produced in three-meter lengths, preserving the veining in the finished column. At the quarry in Kolmården, ten-meter lengths were selected, then drilled and wedged out, rough-hewn, and turned on a lathe. There is a balcony with a decorative iron balustrade and an elaborate art deco electrolier suspended from the dome's centre. On the main floor, the bookshelves are mostly located in bays underneath the balcony; the balcony has an ambulatory providing access to the various subject-areas and to the Brotherton Collection at the rear.

Beneath the main floor of the library are two further circular floors. In 1993, a three-floor extension at the rear, the West Building, was opened to provide more space for readers, books and library staff, and to unite the Brotherton Collection with other Special Collections that have accumulated over the years.

== Art collection ==
Works in the university's Art Collection, also managed by the library, can be seen in the University Gallery, located in the Parkinson Building.

== Miscellaneous ==
The university celebrated the 75th anniversary of the opening of the library with a programme of talks and conducted tours of the building, which culminated on 6 October 2011 in a lecture by Melvyn Bragg, the then Chancellor of the university, entitled "The Book of Books – the radical impact of the King James Bible, 1611–2011".

== See also ==
- Libraries of the University of Leeds
- List of libraries in Leeds
