= Ray Lightwood =

Raymond Lightwood
- Born: 1922; Coventry
- Died: 16 January 2001 (aged 78–79)
- Education: Birmingham University
- Known for: developing the first variable rate heart pacemaker
- Scientific career
- Fields: Medical engineering
- Workplaces: Queen Elizabeth Hospital Birmingham

Raymond Lightwood (1922–2001) was a British medical engineer who developed the first variable rate heart pacemaker, together with Leon Abrams at the University of Birmingham.

Ray Lightwood was born in Coventry. He was educated at Birchfield Road School in Birmingham. During World War Two Lightwood received training at the Radar and Wireless training school at RAF Yatesbury and after initially serving in India as a ground and service engineer, he became a travelling engineer with South East Asia Command. He was also seconded to Royal Aircraft Establishment at Farnborough to study captured radar equipment. After the war Lightwood worked as an industrial electronics applications engineer and representative.

Lightwood was a medical engineer, researcher and technician in the Department of Surgery at Queen Elizabeth Hospital Birmingham from 1958 to 1987. In consultation with cardiothoracic surgeon Leon Abrams he researched, designed and developed the first variable rate heart pacemaker in 1960. Lightwood used electrodes attached to the heart coupled to an external pacemaker, so all the electronic components were kept outside the body, and could be replaced in the event of failure. This was the first patient controlled permanent pacemaker as the primary circuit consisted of an inducing coil supplied by a portable transistor which produced short pulses at adjustable intervals and intensity.

Ray Lightwood gave lectures about his research to conferences and societies. Lightwood also delivered lectures at Birmingham University, Keele University and the University of Nottingham, as well as at Matthew Boulton College in Birmingham and at Coventry Technical College. Lightwood was awarded the Official Degree of BSc (Pure Science) in 1974 by Birmingham University for which he submitted a thesis entitled 'An inductively coupled system for electrical pacemaking of the heart'. He retired from the Department of Surgery at Queen Elizabeth Hospital Birmingham in 1987. He was a Methodist Lay Preacher. Lightwood died in 2001.
