= Hackney Town Hall =

Municipal building in London, England

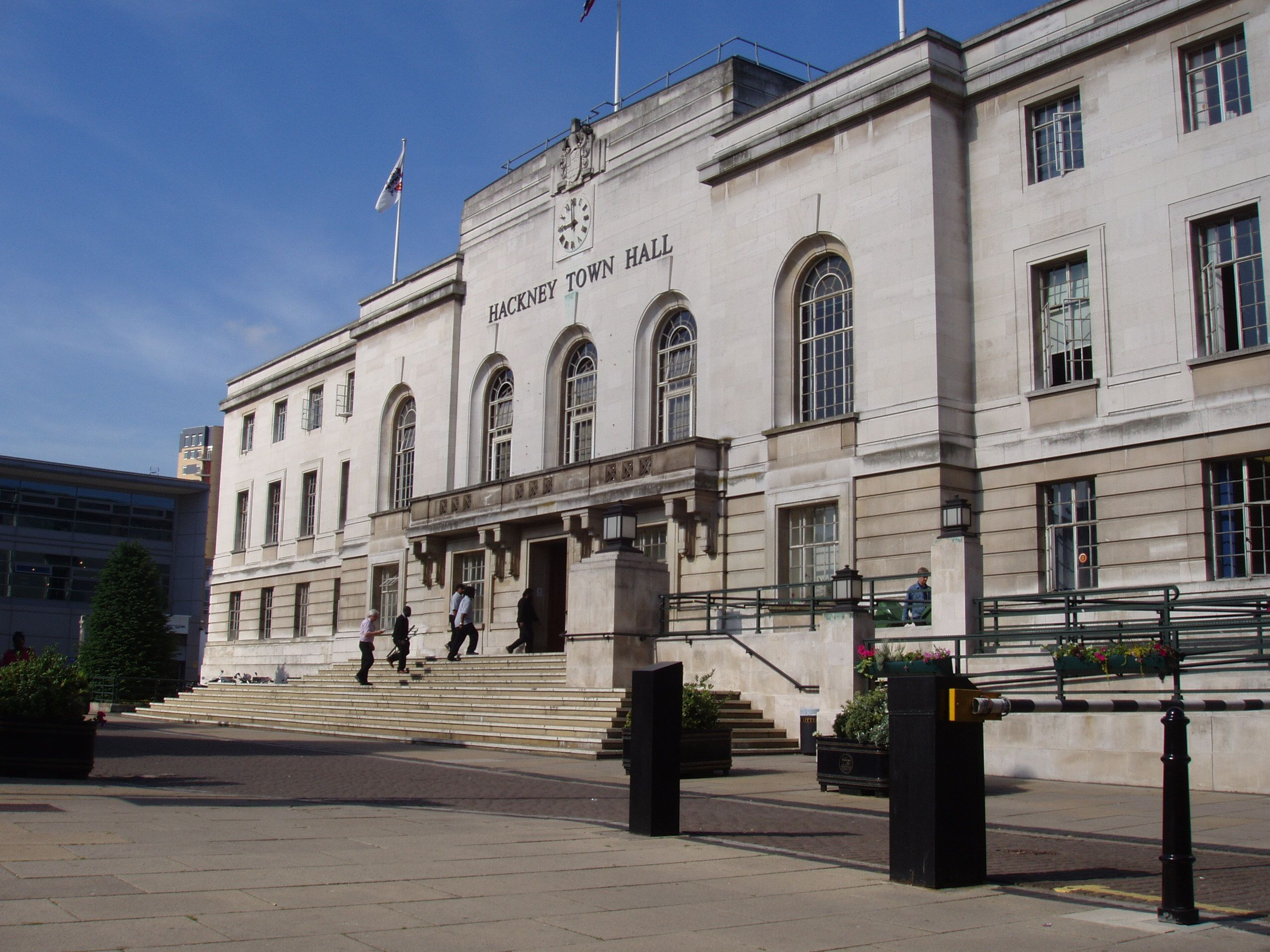
- Hackney Town Hall

- Shown in Hackney
- 51.5451°N 0.0564°W
- Location: Mare Street, Hackney, London, England

History
- Built: 1937

Site notes
- Architect(s): Lanchester and Lodge
- Architectural style: Art Deco style

Listed Building – Grade II
- Designated: 19 July 1991
- Reference no.: 1235869

Hackney Town Hall is a municipal building in Hackney, London. The town hall, which is the headquarters of Hackney London Borough Council, is a Grade II listed building.

== History ==
The original town hall in Hackney was a private house, erected in Mare Street in 1802, which had been converted into a simple vestry office for the Parish of St John in the mid 19th century.

When the first civic facility became too small, it was replaced by a building further south on Mare Street, designed by Harnmack and Lambert in the Italianate style, which was completed in 1866. This, the second town hall, was extended at both ends in 1898. It became the headquarters of the Metropolitan Borough of Hackney when it became a metropolitan borough in 1899. After the second facility was also deemed inadequate, it was demolished to create a civic garden in front of what was to become the current facility.

The site selected for current facility, the third town hall, was just to the west of the second town hall on land which had previously been occupied by residential properties. The foundation stone was laid by the Minister of Health, Sir Hilton Young, on 22 October 1934. It was designed by Lanchester and Lodge in the Art Deco style and officially opened by the Chairman of London County Council, Lord Snell, on 3 July 1937. The design involved a symmetrical main frontage with thirteen bays facing onto Mare Street; the central section of five bays featured a doorway flanked by windows on either side on the ground floor; there were five round headed widows leading onto a balcony on the first floor with a clock and the borough coat of arms above. The principal rooms were the council chamber, the mayor's parlour, the members' room and an assembly hall running along the rear of the building.

The building continued to be the local seat of government after the formation of the enlarged London Borough of Hackney in 1965. However, many of the council officers and their departments, who had been located in disparate departments around the area, moved to the new Hackney Service Centre in Hillman Street, designed by Hopkins Architects, in 2010.

An extensive refurbishment of the town Hall to the designs of Hawkins\Brown was completed in 2017. Extinction Rebellion held a series of protests in East London followed by a people's assembly outside the town hall in July 2019.
