= Leon Abrams =

British surgeon

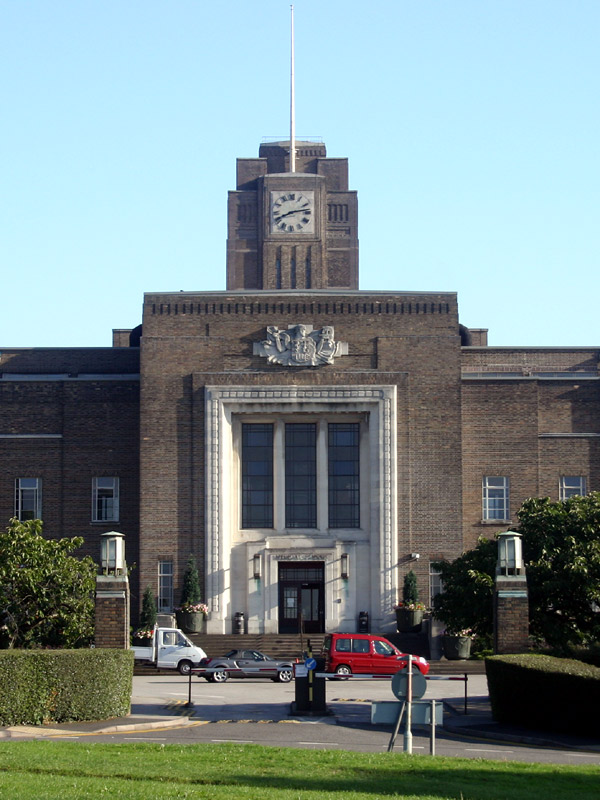
Birmingham University Medical School

Leon David Abrams FRCS (1923–2012) was a British cardiothoracic surgeon who developed and implanted the first variable rate heart pacemaker, together with Ray Lightwood, at the University of Birmingham.

Leon Abrams was born in Leeds. He graduated from Birmingham University with an MBChB degree in Medicine in 1945.

Abrams was a cardiothoracic surgeon at Queen Elizabeth Hospital Birmingham. With medical engineer Ray Lightwood, he developed and implanted the first variable rate pacemaker in 1960. The first variable rate pacemaker implant took place in March 1960. Two further implants took place in April 1960. Fifty-six patients had received implants by 1966. He set up a leading centre for lung and heart surgery at Queen Elizabeth Hospital Birmingham.

Leon Abrams was elected a Fellow of the Royal College of Surgeons in 1951.
