= Passavant =

Passavant may refer to:

== People ==
- Fanny Passavant (1849-1944), English librarian
- Johann David Passavant (1787–1861), German painter, curator and artist
- William Passavant (1821–1894), American Lutheran minister

== French communes ==
- Passavant, Doubs
- Passavant-en-Argonne, Marne
- Passavant-la-Rochère, Haute-Saône
- Passavant-sur-Layon, Maine-et-Loire

== Hospitals ==
- Passavant Area Hospital, a hospital in Jacksonville, Illinois
- Passavant Memorial Hospital, a hospital in Chicago, Illinois
- UPMC Passavant, a hospital within University of Pittsburgh Medical Center located in Pittsburgh, Pennsylvania

== Other uses ==
- Barony of Passavant, in Frankish Greece
