= Fanny Passavant =

British university librarian

Fanny Juliet Passavant, FLA (16 October 1849 – 27 September 1944), was the first librarian of the University of Leeds, in Leeds, England, having previously been librarian of its predecessor, the Yorkshire College. She was the only woman to hold a position of university librarian when the college gained university status in 1904.

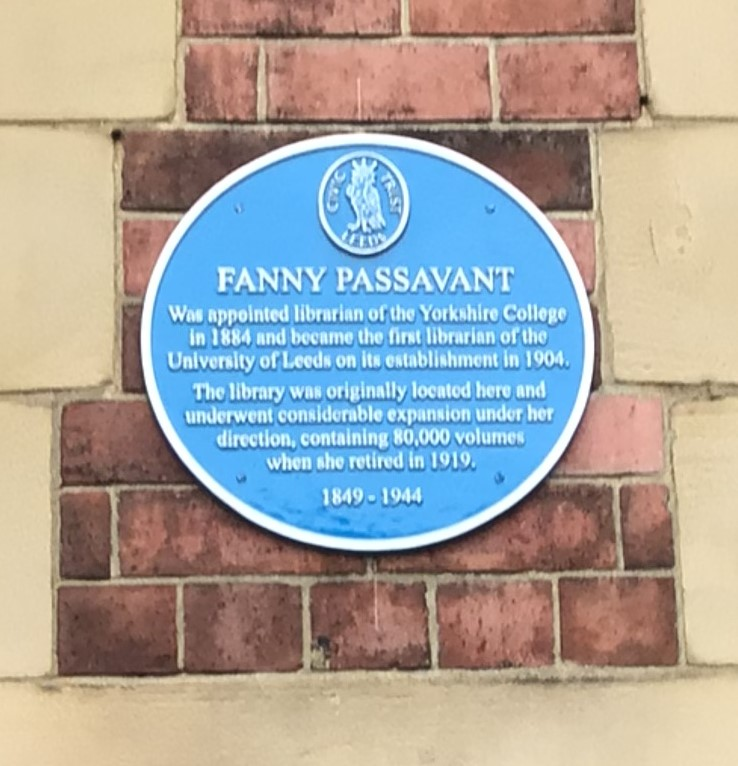
Fanny Passavant's Leeds Civic Trust Blue Plaque

== Family ==
Born in 1849, Passavant was a member of a family of Huguenot refugees who settled in Basel and Geneva in the 16th century. Her grandfather was Jakob Ludwig Passavant (1751–1827), a pastor of the Reformed Church and childhood friend of Johann Wolfgang von Goethe.

== Career ==
Passavant was appointed as the first librarian (overseen by an academic honorary librarian) of the Yorkshire College in Leeds in 1885 at a salary of 18 shillings per week. The college became the University of Leeds in 1904. At the time, no other university had a female librarian. Initially her role was expected to be clerical, but Passavant worked on the cataloguing and increasing the number of volumes. From an initial catalogue of about 4,000 books to the 85,000 the library contained when she retired, Passavant's role became increasingly professional. Passavant joined the Library Association in 1903 becoming a Fellow later based on her experience and position.

Passavant retired in 1919 at age 70. When she retired a new, professional, librarian was appointed. Richard Offor was previously the assistant librarian at University College, London, on a salaryof £350 per year, and his ambition was to 'build a new University Library', as they needed more space for the amount of items they had acquired.

A lover of choral music, Passavant was a long time member of the Leeds Philharmonic Society choir and a committee member of the society as well as being a member of the Leeds Musical Festival choir.

== Honours ==
On 30 November 2021 Leeds Civic Trust erected a blue plaque to honour Passavant's memory on the wall of the Great Hall at the University of Leeds where its first library had been located. The university's vice-chancellor, Professor Simone Buitendijk, said at the unveiling:

Fanny Passavant is an important part of our history and it is wonderful to honour her today. Her energy and commitment led to the establishment of an important collection of books, and that has been built on by successive generations to form the world-class facilities now on offer to students, with libraries across the campus.
