= Old Town Hall, Hackney =

Municipal building in London, England

Old Town Hall
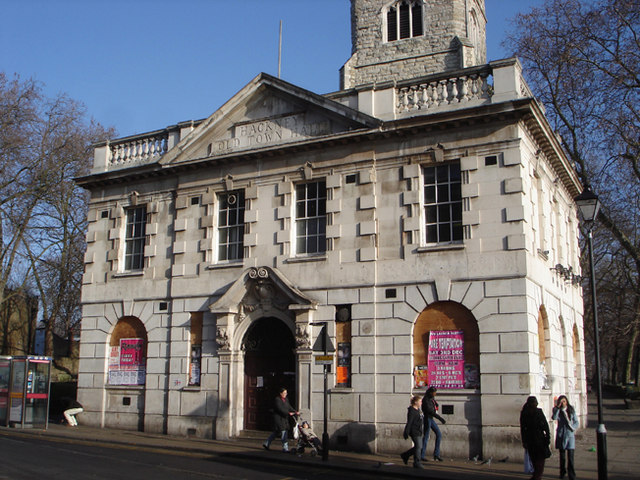
- The building in 2006

- Shown in Hackney
- 51.5478°N 0.0547°W
- Location: Mare Street, Hackney

History
- Built: 1802

Site notes
- Architectural style: Neoclassical style

Listed Building – Grade II
- Official name: The Midland Bank
- Designated: 4 February 1975
- Reference no.: 1226899

The Old Town Hall is a municipal building in Mare Street in Hackney, London. The building, which is currently used as a public house, is a Grade II listed building.

== History ==
The building was commissioned as a private house. The site selected on the east side of Mare Street had formed the nave of the Church of St Augustine which was built in the late 13th century and demolished in 1798. The house was originally constructed in brick and completed in 1802. It was then converted into a simple vestry office for the Parish of St John in the mid 19th century. When the building became too small, it was replaced by a building further south on Mare Street, designed by Harnmack and Lambert in the Italianate style, which was completed in 1866.

In the late 19th century, the original building became an events venue and also accommodated the local masonic lodge. It was acquired by the London City and Midland Bank in 1899 and was remodelled by the new owners with a new stone facade in 1900.

The design involved a symmetrical main frontage of four bays facing onto Mare Street. It was rusticated on the ground floor. The central section, which was slightly projected forward, featured a doorcase formed by a pair of pilasters with lion masks supporting an open pediment containing a cartouche. The outer bays on the ground floor were fenestrated by round headed windows with voussoirs and keystones, while all the bays on the first floor were fenestrated by sash windows with architraves and keystones. At roof level, the central section was surmounted by a pediment, with a panel inscribed with the words "Hackney Old Town Hall" in the tympanum, while the outer bays were surmounted by a balustrated parapet.

The bank branch was rebranded as Midland Bank in 1923 and as HSBC in 1992. In the mid-1990s, Hackney London Borough Council sold the freehold to HSBC, who then sold it on to Coral, who operated it as a bookmaker. In 2021, it was then converted for use as a public house known as the "Hackney Tap".
