= Great Hall of the University of Leeds =

Grade II listed building in Leeds, England

The Great Hall
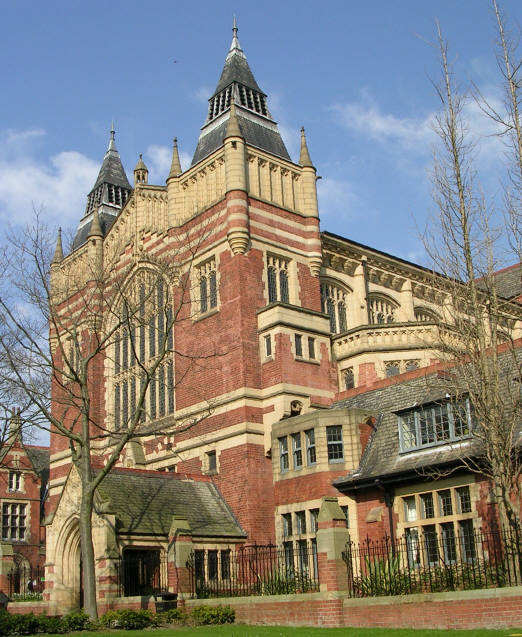
- The Great Hall Building of the University of Leeds
- Interactive map of the The Great Hall area

General information
- Architectural style: Gothic
- Location: Leeds, England
- Coordinates: 53.807570°N 1.554547°W
- Construction started: 1884
- Completed: 1894
- Cost: £22,000+
- Client: Yorkshire College

Design and construction
- Architect: Alfred Waterhouse R.A.

The Great Hall is a grade II listed Gothic Revival building located at the University of Leeds in West Yorkshire, England. The building is primarily used for formal occasions such as graduation ceremonies and university students' examinations. Its undercroft was previously utilised to house the university library collections before the Brotherton Library opened in 1936. The Great Hall is one illustration of the many diverse styles of buildings on the campus of the University of Leeds; it is an example of red brick architecture associated with the term red brick university.

== History ==
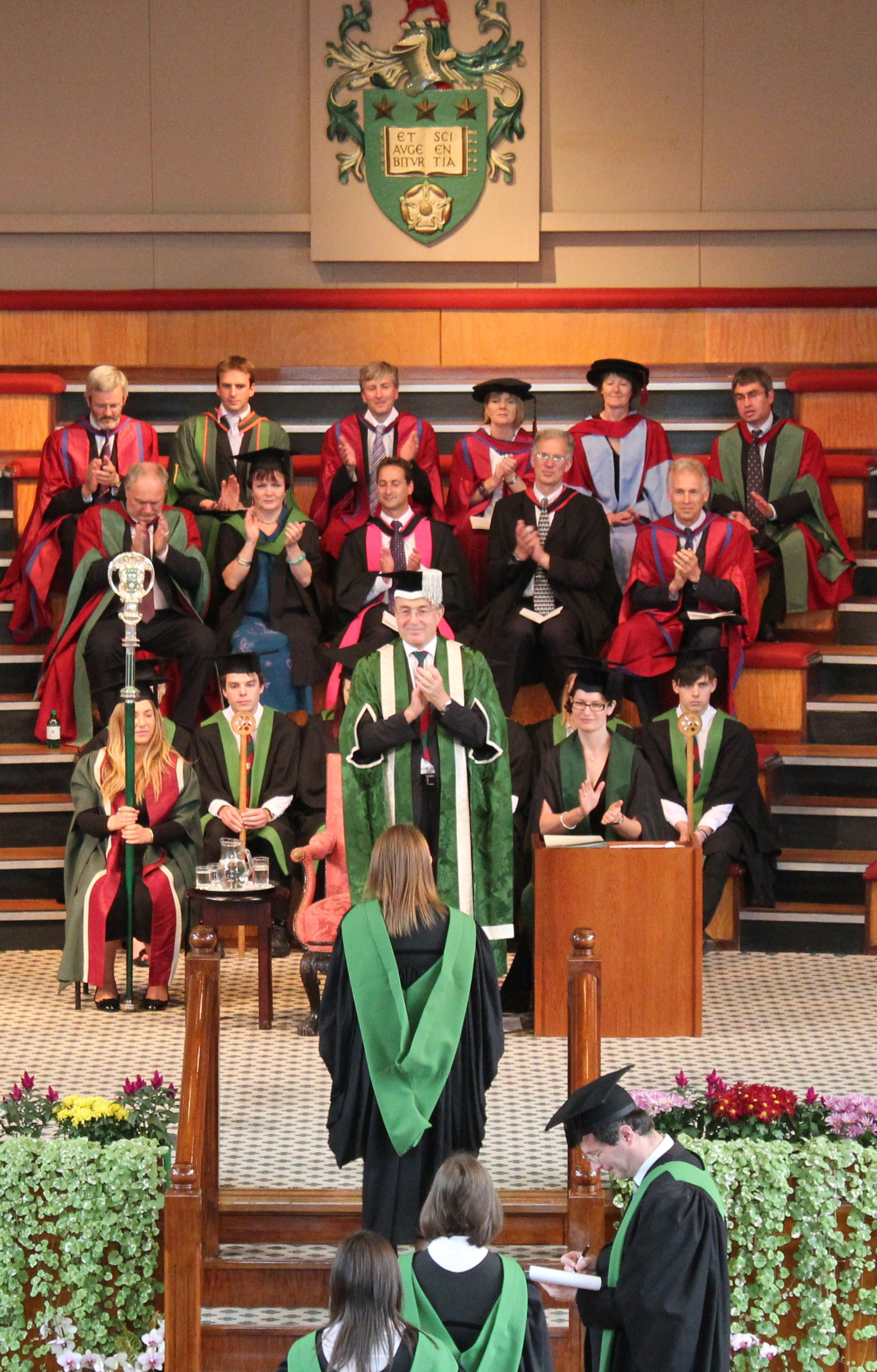
The Great Hall is the venue for graduation ceremonies

The Great Hall is built on a site of the former Beech Grove Hall Estate, which was purchased in 1879 by the then Yorkshire College before the college joined the now defunct Victoria University (alongside the forerunners of the Universities of Manchester and Liverpool). This estate was later demolished in 1884 for it to become the site of the Clothworkers buildings of the Baines Memorial Wing and the Great Hall building itself. The buildings were designed by the late architect Alfred Waterhouse R.A (famed for his works on the Natural History Museum in London) in red pressed brick and had dressings of Bolton Wood stone in a Gothic Collegiate style.

This collegiate style used by Alfred Waterhouse helped to coin the term red brick university, a phrase first used by Edgar Allison Peers (under the pseudonym "Bruce Truscot"), a Spanish Professor at the University of Liverpool in his 1943 book Redbrick University when describing the Victoria Building, University of Liverpool. Since then, the six civic universities founded around 1900 independently use the term red brick university, these consist of the University of Birmingham, the University of Bristol, the University of Liverpool, the University of Leeds, the University of Manchester and the University of Sheffield.

The Gothic style Great Hall incorporated the university's main library and cost around £22,000 to build which was raised partly by public appeal. It was originally used as the main University Library until the opening of the Brotherton Library in 1936 and other areas which opened in the same period such as the Parkinson Building. As well as being the location for the ceremonial occasions, it was also used for meetings, exams and public lectures.

The Great Hall was opened in October 1894 by the Duke and Duchess of York. The panorama seen from the door of the Great Hall takes in nearly 150 years of university-related building. From the redbrick architecture of the early Clothworkers buildings to the Portland stone of the Michael Sadler arts building to the steel and glass of the Marjorie and Arnold Ziff Building. Leeds therefore takes its place as one of the largest and most diverse universities in the UK.

When the Yorkshire College became the University of Leeds in 1904, the Library had 4742 art volumes, 2,251 maths and science volumes and 1,139 technology volumes. But by 1926 the University Library’s collection had grown to over 100,000 volumes.

The Great Hall is still used to this day for meetings, examinations and graduation ceremonies and is one of a small cluster of buildings on the University of Leeds campus exhibiting redbrick architecture traits associated with a select number of civic universities in the United Kingdom.
