= Parkinson Building =

Building at Leeds University, England

The Parkinson Building
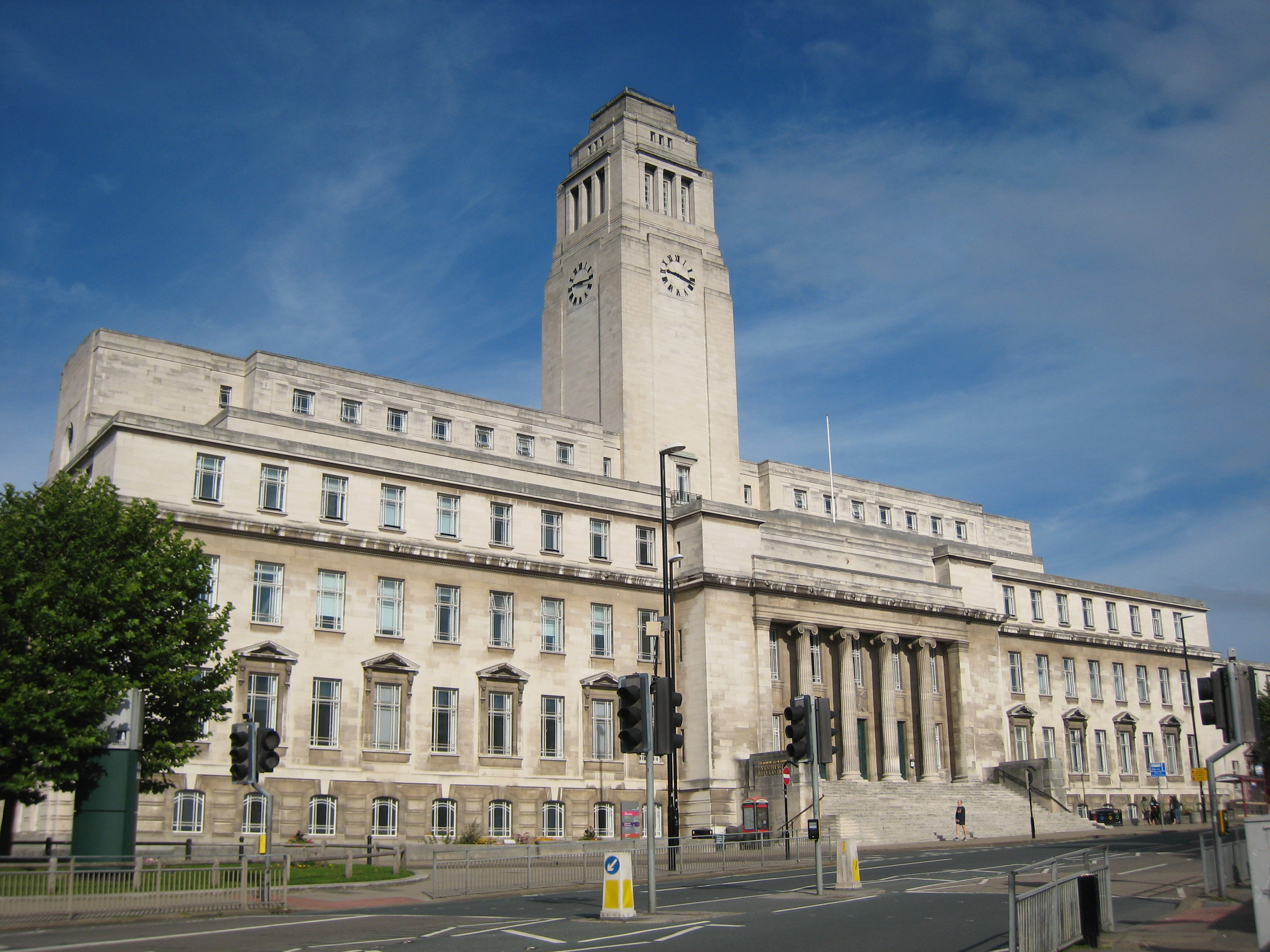
- Parkinson Building, August 2017
- Interactive map of the The Parkinson Building area

General information
- Architectural style: Greek Revival
- Location: Leeds, West Yorkshire, England
- Coordinates: 53.808°N 1.553°W
- Construction started: 1938
- Completed: 1951
- Cost: £200,000+
- Client: University of Leeds

Design and construction
- Architects: Thomas Arthur Lodge and Thomas Geoffry Lucas

The Parkinson Building is a grade II listed building in Greek Revival style by Thomas Lodge located at the University of Leeds in West Yorkshire, England. The clock tower is the highest point of the building and stands at 57 metres (187 ft) tall, making it the 17th-tallest building in the city of Leeds.

The building is named after Frank Parkinson, a major benefactor to the university, who donated £200,000 towards the cost of the new building. The building construction started in 1938; however, the outbreak of the Second World War in 1939 halted building work, with construction resuming and finishing in 1951. The building was officially opened on 9 November 1951 by The Princess Royal, Chancellor of the university from 1951 to 1965.

A prominent landmark in Leeds, the tower can be seen for miles around the campus and from the M621 motorway some 12.1 miles (19.5 km) from the site, and has become emblematic of the university itself with Leeds incorporating the clock tower into the university logo in 2006.

== History ==
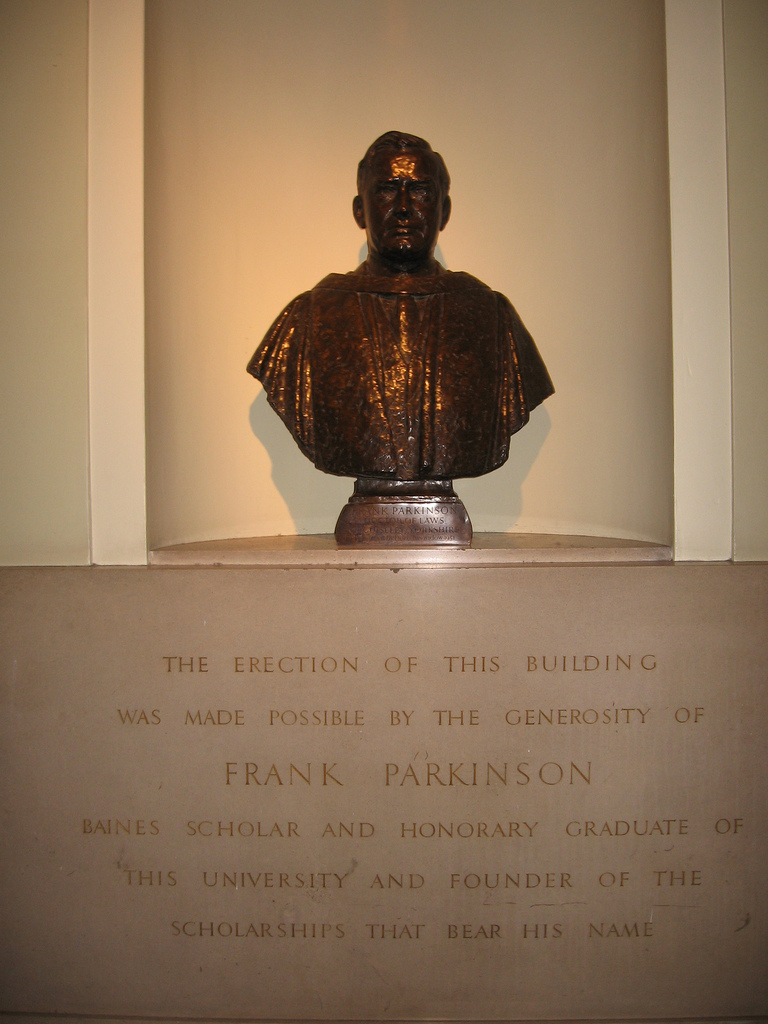
Frank Parkinson memorial

The university approved plans for the new building early in the 20th century; it was designed by Thomas Arthur Lodge (a leading Scottish architect) and Thomas Geoffry Lucas (an English architect and fellow of the Royal Institute of British Architects), whose works included the original Queen Elizabeth Hospital in Birmingham and St Bartholomew's Hospital, London respectively.

A former student of the University of Leeds, Frank Parkinson, who was a successful British electrical engineer and businessman, most notable for early electric lighting installations, viewed the plans for the new building, and in 1936 was so impressed with the plan he offered to pay £200,000 towards the costs of the entrance hall and clock tower.

Initial construction of the building began in 1938, with completion finishing 13 years later due to the outbreak of the Second World War halting the work. The building was officially opened on 9 November 1951 by the then Chancellor of the University of Leeds, The Princess Royal. In 2019 Associated Architects completed a major refurbishment to the Language Centre which covers two floors of the building.

== Present day ==
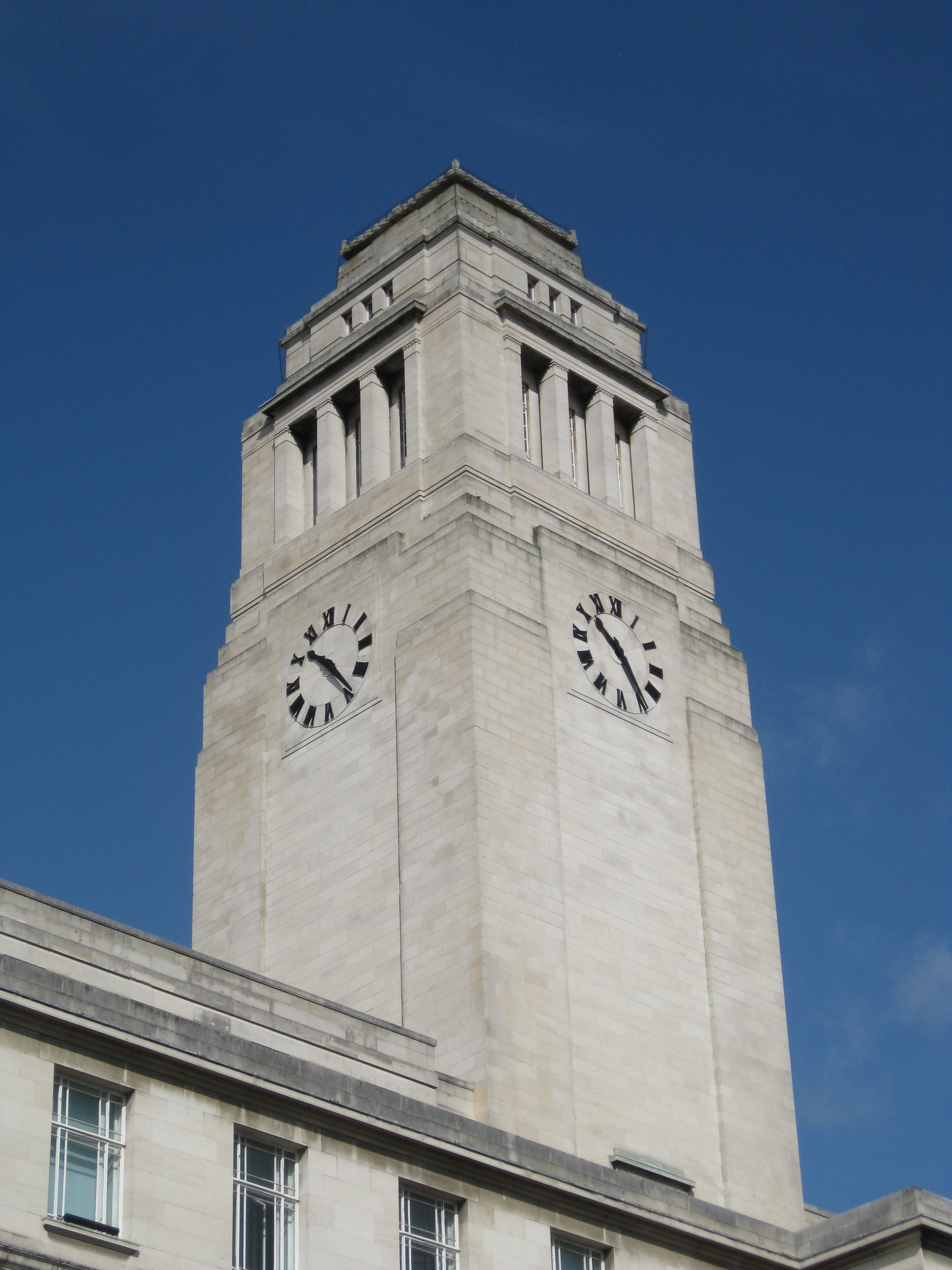
The University Clock Tower

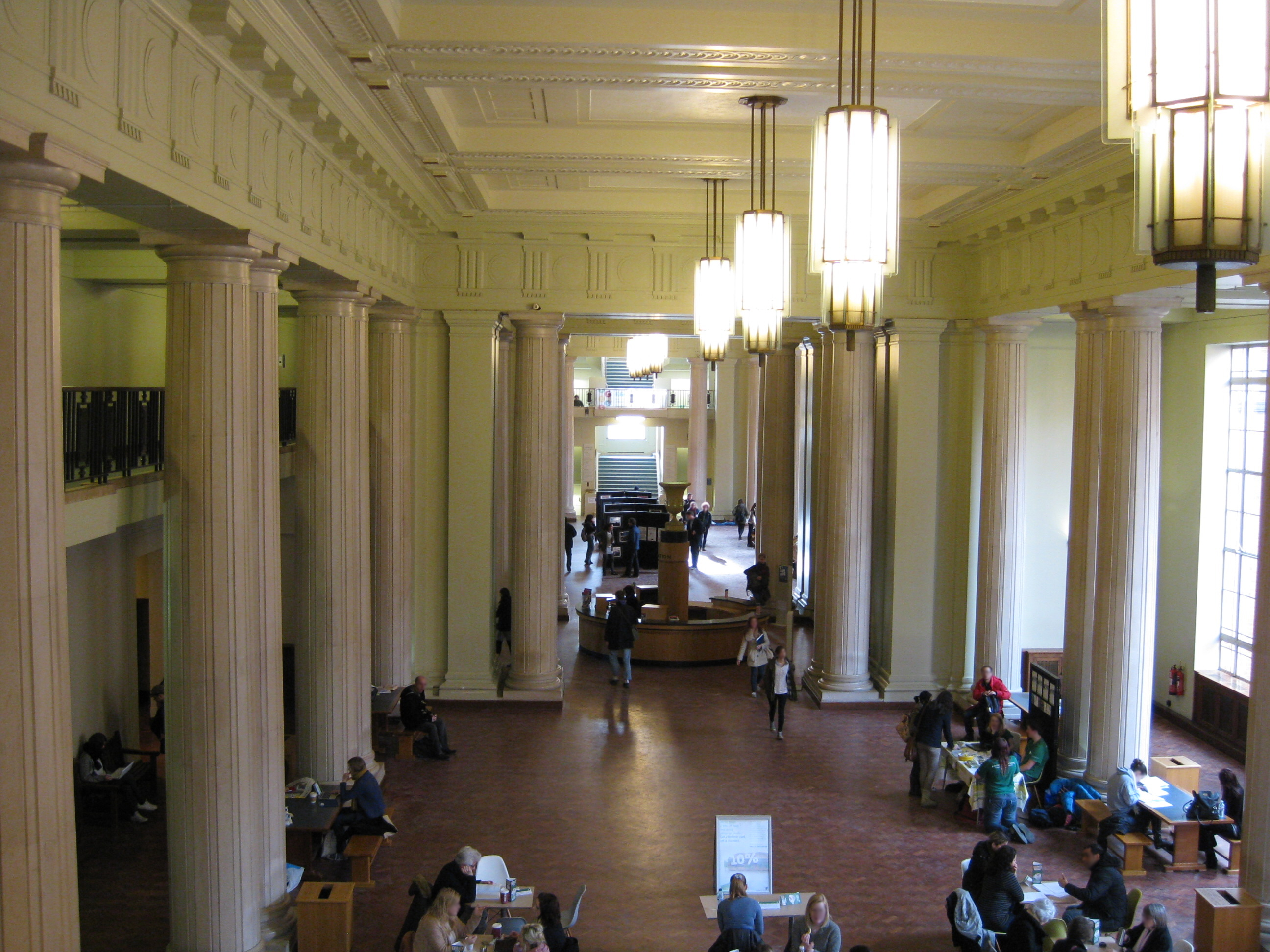
Parkinson Court

Parkinson Court was refurbished in 2004, being restored to its former glory as a gateway to the Brotherton Library, which opened in 1936 alongside the rest of the university campus. The Brotherton Library currently holds the main collections for the arts, social sciences and law.

The Parkinson Building is also home to the University of Leeds Art Collection and Gallery, which is free to enter for the general public and displays an extensive array of paintings, drawings, sculptures, ceramics, and photographs, along with temporary exhibitions from time to time. These collections also contribute to the holdings in the Brotherton Library which comprise William Shakespeare's First Folio (Mr. William Shakespeares Comedies, Histories. & Tragedies) published in 1623 and valued at around £15 million, manuscripts by Victorian Era writers The Brontë sisters and hundreds of letters to French poet, playwright, novelist, essayist, visual artist, statesman and human rights activist, Victor Hugo.

In May 2006, the university began re-branding itself to bring together its visual identity to produce one consistent look. A new logo was produced (based on that used during the centennial celebrations in 2004), to replace the combined use of the modified university crest and the old Parkinson Building, which has been in use since 2004.

At present, the Parkinson Building houses a range of services for staff and students of the university whilst having collections available to the general public. The services operated in the building include The Stanley and Audrey Burton Art Gallery, Classics, Cleaning Services, Course Enquiries Office, History, Institute for Medieval Studies, The Language Centre, Trade Union Offices, University Archives, Coffee Bars, Computing Clusters and Residential and Commercial Services. Parkinson Court has an exemplar Palladian floor plan, which has a double height ceiling in the middle of a cross under the clock tower.

In 2015, Peregrine Falcons started showing an interest in the tower and have nested on there every year since. The tray is managed by the university's Sustainability Service who have installed two cameras on the nesting tray. By summer 2024, 14 chicks have successfully fledged and all have been ringed by the Yorkshire Wildlife Trust in collaboration with the university. The tray is situated at the level of the belfry on the North-East face of the tower in the bottom of the left of three tall windows.

== See also ==
- Listed buildings in Leeds (Hyde Park and Woodhouse)
