= Thomas Arthur Lodge =

Thomas Arthur Lodge (1888–1967) was a British architect.

He studied at the Architectural Association in London until 1909, and was then articled to Thomas Geoffry Lucas. After a time spent with a number of different firms, Lucas and Henry Vaughan Lanchester took Lodge into partnership in 1923. Lucas retired in 1930, and Lanchester died in 1953, leaving Lodge in charge of the firm. The practice, now named Lanchester & Lodge, continued after his death in 1967.

Amongst other works, Lodge designed the original Queen Elizabeth Hospital, Birmingham, which opened in 1938. In 1929 he and Lucas designed the art deco Parkinson Building for the University of Leeds, another grade II listed building. Also grade II listed, Hackney Town Hall was designed by the firm and built in 1934–1937. Watford Technical College was begun in 1938 to designs by Lanchester & Lodge, but was not finished until after the Second World War. The David Keir building at Queen's University Belfast was designed by Lodge in the 1950s, and opened in 1959.
