= Queen Elizabeth Hospital Birmingham (1933–2010) =

- University Hospitals Birmingham NHS Foundation Trust
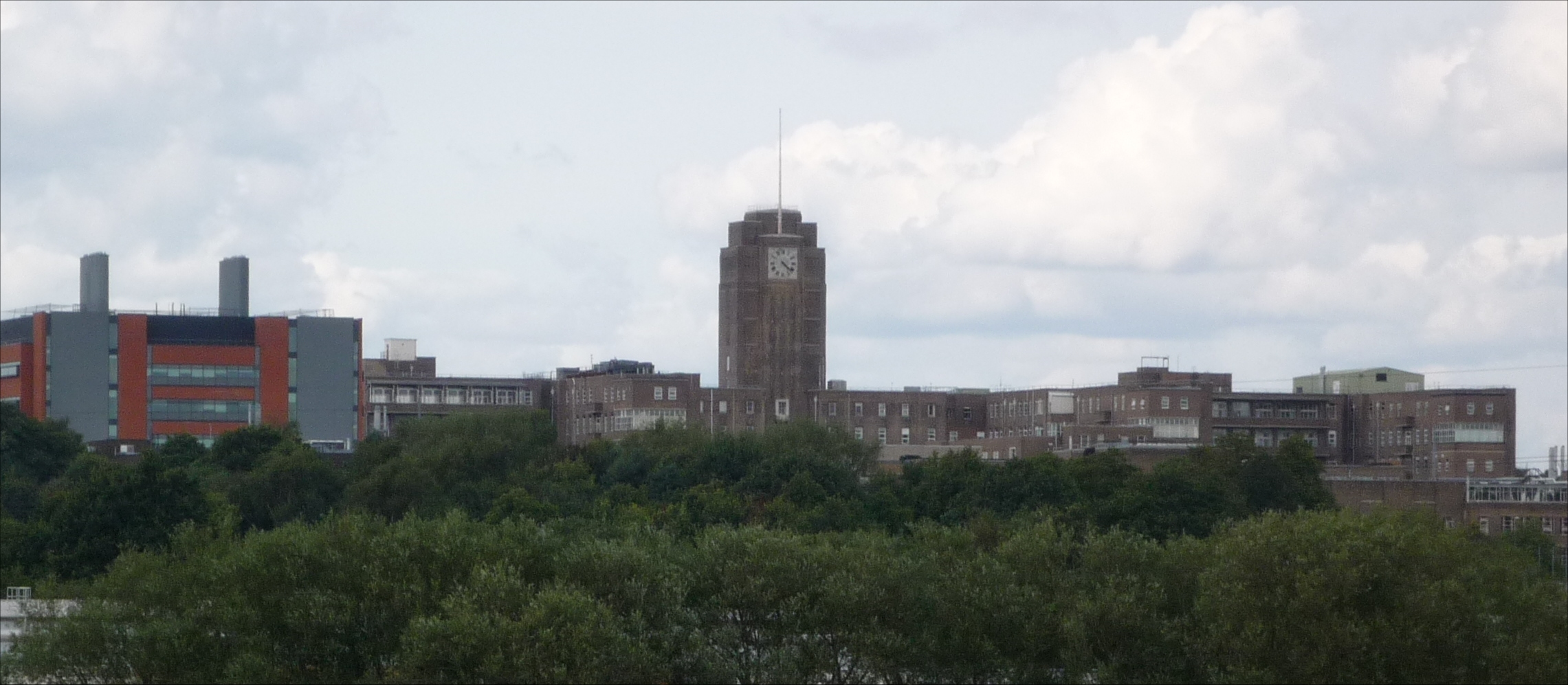
- The hospital, from the south

- Location within West Midlands

Geography
- Location: Edgbaston, Birmingham, England
- Coordinates: 52°27′11″N 1°56′19″W

Organisation
- Care system: NHS
- Affiliated university: University of Birmingham

History
- Founded: 1933
- Closed: 2010

Links
- Website: www.uhb.nhs.uk
- Lists: Hospitals in England

The original Queen Elizabeth Hospital was an NHS hospital in the Edgbaston area of Birmingham situated very close to the University of Birmingham. It was replaced by the new Queen Elizabeth Hospital, nearby.

The hospital provided a range of services including secondary services for its local population and regional and national services for the people of the West Midlands and beyond.

== Origins of the hospital and the medical school ==
A variety of charitable hospitals opened in Birmingham between 1817, when the Orthopaedic Hospital opened, and 1881, when the Skin Hospital served its first patients. One of these, Queens Hospital, established in 1840 by a local surgeon William Sands Cox, was predominantly for clinical instruction for the medical students of Birmingham. In 1884 these institutions, including Cox's medical school, united as part of the University of Birmingham, on its new campus in Edgbaston.

== History ==
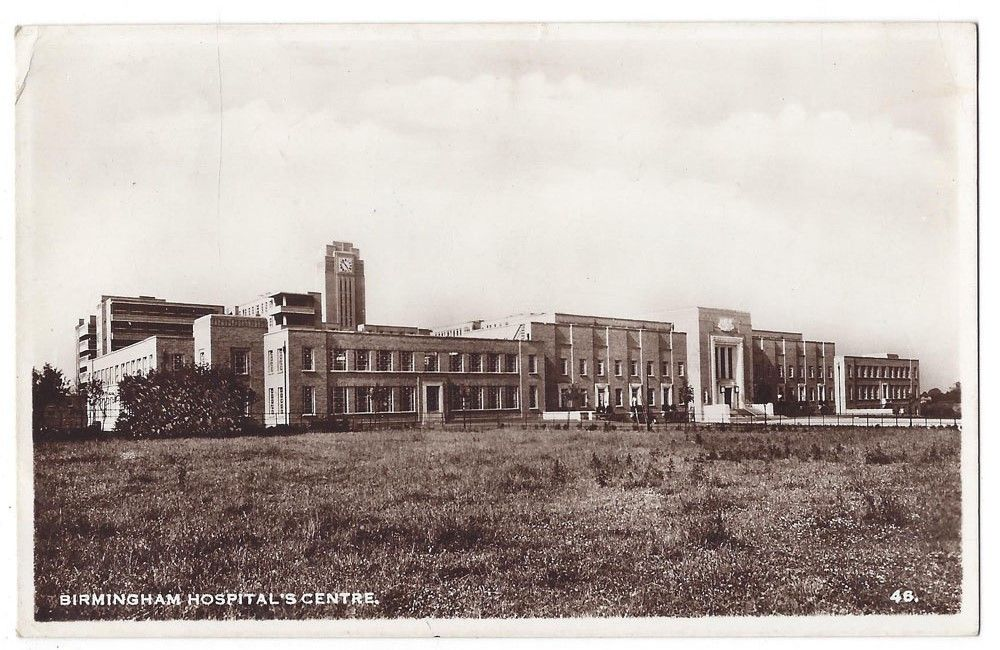
A 1930s or 1940s 'Excel Series' postcard (postally used in 1948) showing the hospital

In 1922, Alderman W. A. Cadbury opposed the extension of the General Hospital in the city centre, and a new hospital in Edgbaston was proposed. Five years later an executive board for the building of this hospital, at an estimated cost of £1,000,000, was formed. Around 5/6 of the money was to be dedicated to the hospital and 1/6 to the university for the construction of the Medical School, and in 1929 plans were drawn up for a 600-bed centre that would encourage clinical teaching of medicine, surgery, therapeutics, midwifery, diseases of women, ophthalmology, ENT, orthopaedics, dermatology, venereal disease and radiology. The United Kingdom was then in a period of financial crisis and there was controversy over the expense, so in April 1930 an appeal to build the Queen Elizabeth Hospital was launched and by the following year donations exceeded £600,000 enabling construction to start in 1933. The building ultimately cost £1,029,057, which was £129,406 less than the money raised by donations.

The site of the hospital, which is adjacent to the remains of the Roman Metchley Fort, was presented by Cadbury Brothers in 1930. Building began in 1933, and the foundation stone was laid by Edward, Prince of Wales on 23 October 1934. It was designed by Thomas Arthur Lodge with 840 bed spaces, 100 of which were for paying patients. Some wards had two or four beds but others for 'regular' patients held up to 16. When opened on 31 December 1938 by the Duke of Gloucester and his wife, it consisted of the Vincent Medical Block, the Cadbury Surgical Block, and the Nuffield House Nurses' Home. It became known as the Queen Elizabeth Hospital when it was officially opened by King George VI and Queen Elizabeth on 1 March 1939, just over two years after Elizabeth became queen.

During the Second World War the occupancy of the hospital rose significantly from 3,165 to 12,136 as it treated civilian and military casualties and many local businesses and university buildings were converted into extra wards. In 1943, the Neurosurgery Department was established. Penicillin was first used in the hospital in 1944. When the war ended, patient numbers at the hospital began to decrease, with staff treating 6,000 inpatients, 20,000 outpatients and another 48,000 casualties during 1945. On any given day the QE had 800 inpatients with an average stay of 25 days. The government encouraged and approved the establishment of a 65-bed cancer unit at the QE in 1945. In 1948, the hospital became part of the Birmingham United Hospital Group under the National Health Service.

In 1960, the first heart pacemaker in Britain was at the Queen Elizabeth Hospital. In 1968, an IBM 1440 electronic digital computer was introduced to improve efficiency. In 1970, development began on the west side of the site, particularly an enlarged radiotherapy department and a new laboratory block. 1974 saw the first renal dialysis at the hospital. In 1982, the Queen Elizabeth Hospital came under the control of the West Midlands Regional Health Authority and in 1995 it was merged with Selly Oak Hospital to become part of the University Hospitals NHS Trust.

Entrance

In 1997, a new haemophilia unit was opened and Gisela Stuart MP opened the new cardiac laboratories. The turn of the 21st century saw two new developments at the Cancer Centre: in 1999, the Patrick Room opened to give advice and information on the different types of the cancer to patients and carers and 2000 saw the official opening of the Young Person's Unit. In 2001, the Maxillofacial department and the Cardiac Wellcome Building opened and a year later, Gary Lineker opened the Wellcome Trust Clinical Research Facility. Later that year Julie Walters, a former nurse at the hospital before acting, opened the Breast screening Unit. On 30 June 2004, Selly Oak Hospital and the Queen Elizabeth Hospital received Foundation Trust status. In 2008, celebrations marked the 3000th liver transplant at the hospital.

During 2010 the services from the Old Queen Elizabeth Hospital were transferred in phases across to the new Queen Elizabeth Hospital.

However, in March 2013, University Hospitals NHS Trust was forced to re-open part of the old hospital to cope with the increased number of patients. Two wards of 36 beds each, one for men and one for women, were reopened in the part of the old hospital known as West Block.

== Notable staff ==
- Babatunde Kwaku Adadevoh, vice-chancellor, University of Lagos, had first post as physician here.
- Julie Walters, actress, was student nurse here for 18 months before acting.

== Notable patients ==
Those reported to have been treated here include:

- Dame Edith Pitt, Conservative MP for Birmingham Edgbaston (1966, died there four days after collapsing at home).

== Arms ==
Coat of arms of Queen Elizabeth Hospital Birmingham

Notes
Granted 29 April 1939
Crest
A demi-lion rampant Azure holding in the sinister claw a bow erect Gules stringed Or.
Escutcheon
Per pale indented Or and Azure to the dexter a cockatrice Gules grasping in the dexter claw a trefoil Azure and to the sinister a garb Or on a chief Ermine a dolphin naiant between two lions rampant Azure each holding in the sinister claw a bow erect Gules stringed Gold.
