= Listed buildings in Salisbury (city centre) =

List of buildings in Salisbury, England

Salisbury is a cathedral city and civil parish in Wiltshire, England. It contains 641 listed buildings that are recorded in the National Heritage List for England. Of these 38 are grade I, 139 are Grade II* and 464 are Grade II.

This list is based on information retrieved online from Historic England. The quantity of listed buildings in Salisbury requires subdivision into geographically defined lists. This list includes all listed buildings in the city centre, outside the cathedral close.

== Key ==
Grade	Criteria
I	Buildings that are of exceptional interest
II*	Particularly important buildings of more than special interest
II	Buildings that are of special interest

== Listing ==
Name	Grade	Location	Type	Completed (Note: The date given is the date used by Historic England as significant for the initial building or that of an important part in the structure's description.)	Grid ref. (Note: The grid reference is based on the British national grid reference system, sometimes known as OSGB36, used by the Ordnance Survey.) Geo-coordinates	Notes	Entry number (Note: The "List Entry Number" is a unique number assigned to each listed building and scheduled monument by Historic England.)	Image	
50-56, Barnard Street	II	127-131, Love Lane			SU1474729713; 51°04′00″N 1°47′27″W		1355847	Upload Photo	Q26638566
Training College	II	58, Barnard Street			SU1478329714; 51°04′00″N 1°47′25″W		1023532	Upload Photo	Q26274515
Frowds Almshouses	II*	1-12, Bedwin Street	almshouse		SU1458030259; 51°04′17″N 1°47′36″W		1023534	Frowds Almshouses More images	Q17534571
Taylor's Almshouses	II	1-7, Bedwin Street			SU1463230272; 51°04′18″N 1°47′33″W		1355849	Upload Photo	Q26638568
22, Bedwin Street	II	22, Bedwin Street			SU1454230247; 51°04′17″N 1°47′38″W		1355848	Upload Photo	Q26638567
23-29, Bedwin Street	II	23-29, Bedwin Street			SU1454430272; 51°04′18″N 1°47′38″W		1355851	Upload Photo	Q26638570
24, Bedwin Street	II	24, Bedwin Street			SU1455130251; 51°04′17″N 1°47′37″W		1023533	Upload Photo	Q26274516
26 and 28, Bedwin Street	II	26 and 28, Bedwin Street			SU1459830263; 51°04′17″N 1°47′35″W		1023535	Upload Photo	Q26274517
30, Bedwin Street	II	30, Bedwin Street			SU1460830266; 51°04′18″N 1°47′34″W		1023536	Upload Photo	Q26274518
31, Bedwin Street	II	31, Bedwin Street			SU1455330274; 51°04′18″N 1°47′37″W		1248754	Upload Photo	Q26540945
32, Bedwin Street	II	32, Bedwin Street			SU1461530268; 51°04′18″N 1°47′34″W		1023537	Upload Photo	Q26274519
33, Bedwin Street	II	33, Bedwin Street			SU1456230276; 51°04′18″N 1°47′37″W		1023542	Upload Photo	Q26274525
34, Bedwin Street	II	34, Bedwin Street			SU1462130264; 51°04′17″N 1°47′34″W		1023538	Upload Photo	Q26274520
35 and 37, Bedwin Street	II	35 and 37, Bedwin Street			SU1457330279; 51°04′18″N 1°47′36″W		1023543	Upload Photo	Q26274526
36 and 38, Bedwin Street	II	36 and 38, Bedwin Street			SU1465430276; 51°04′18″N 1°47′32″W		1023539	Upload Photo	Q26274522
45, Bedwin Street	II	45, Bedwin Street			SU1459330283; 51°04′18″N 1°47′35″W		1248759	Upload Photo	Q26540950
54 and 56, Bedwin Street	II	54 and 56, Bedwin Street			SU1470130281; 51°04′18″N 1°47′30″W		1023540	Upload Photo	Q26274523
58, Bedwin Street	II	58, Bedwin Street			SU1471230284; 51°04′18″N 1°47′29″W		1355850	Upload Photo	Q26638569
Croft House	II	60, Bedwin Street			SU1472330284; 51°04′18″N 1°47′28″W		1023541	Upload Photo	Q26274524
Former Church of St Edmund	II*	Bedwin Street	church building		SU1468530344; 51°04′20″N 1°47′30″W		1355852	Former Church of St Edmund More images	Q17546408
The Royal George Public House Including Part of Former No 19	II*	Bedwin Street	pub		SU1452630267; 51°04′18″N 1°47′39″W		1248750	The Royal George Public House Including Part of Former No 19 More images	Q17543907
War Memorial Outside the Former St Edmund's Church (Salisbury Arts Centre)	II	Bedwin Street, SP1 3UT	war memorial		SU1463530335; 51°04′20″N 1°47′33″W		1441721	War Memorial Outside the Former St Edmund's Church (Salisbury Arts Centre) More images	Q66478363
34 and 35, Market Place	II	34 and 35, Blue Boar Row			SU1436830073; 51°04′11″N 1°47′47″W		1355772	Upload Photo	Q26638514
37, Market Place	II	37, Blue Boar Row			SU1438030074; 51°04′11″N 1°47′46″W		1039134	Upload Photo	Q26290919
41-44, Market Place	II	41-44, Blue Boar Row			SU1443530078; 51°04′11″N 1°47′43″W		1023697	Upload Photo	Q26274649
45, Market Place	II	45, Blue Boar Row			SU1445430077; 51°04′11″N 1°47′42″W		1023698	45, Market Place More images	Q26274650
46 and 47, Market Place	II	46 and 47, Blue Boar Row			SU1446430076; 51°04′11″N 1°47′42″W		1259922	46 and 47, Market Place More images	Q26550997
National Westminster Bank	II	48, Blue Boar Row			SU1447330075; 51°04′11″N 1°47′41″W		1355774	Upload Photo	Q26638516
49, Blue Boar Row	II	49, Blue Boar Row			SU1448330072; 51°04′11″N 1°47′41″W		1023699	Upload Photo	Q26274651
50, Blue Boar Row	II	50, Blue Boar Row			SU1449130075; 51°04′11″N 1°47′40″W		1242680	50, Blue Boar Row More images	Q26535441
51, Blue Boar Row	II	51, Blue Boar Row			SU1449830066; 51°04′11″N 1°47′40″W		1355775	51, Blue Boar Row More images	Q26638517
Blue Boar Inn (medieval Building to Rear of Nos 41 and 44 (consecutive))	II*	Blue Boar Row			SU1442830111; 51°04′13″N 1°47′44″W		1039141	Upload Photo	Q17542747
Lloyds Bank	II	Blue Boar Row	bank building		SU1439430106; 51°04′12″N 1°47′45″W		1355773	Lloyds Bank More images	Q26638515
The County Hotel	II	3-7, Bridge Street	hotel		SU1425929934; 51°04′07″N 1°47′52″W		1277756	The County Hotel More images	Q26567150
12 12a and 14, Bridge Street	II	12 12a and 14, Bridge Street			SU1427029954; 51°04′07″N 1°47′52″W		1023546	Upload Photo	Q26274528
The Star Public House	II	Brown Street	pub		SU1464629757; 51°04′01″N 1°47′32″W		1248871	The Star Public House More images	Q26541053
1 and 1a, Brown Street	II	1 and 1a, Brown Street			SU1461030037; 51°04′10″N 1°47′34″W		1023548	Upload Photo	Q26274531
19a, Milford Street (see Details for Further Address Information)	II*	17, Brown Street			SU1461729963; 51°04′08″N 1°47′34″W		1259793	19a, Milford Street (see Details for Further Address Information)	Q17544177
71a and 75, Brown Street	II	71a and 75, Brown Street			SU1464829736; 51°04′00″N 1°47′32″W		1355856	Upload Photo	Q26638574
77 and 79, Brown Street	II	77 and 79, Brown Street			SU1464929725; 51°04′00″N 1°47′32″W		1248878	Upload Photo	Q26541060
81, Brown Street	II	81, Brown Street			SU1465129717; 51°04′00″N 1°47′32″W		1023549	Upload Photo	Q26274532
82 and 84, Brown Street	II	82 and 84, Brown Street			SU1462729724; 51°04′00″N 1°47′33″W		1023547	Upload Photo	Q26274529
86 and 88, Brown Street	II	86 and 88, Brown Street			SU1462829715; 51°04′00″N 1°47′33″W		1355855	Upload Photo	Q26638573
87, Brown Street	II	87, Brown Street			SU1465329697; 51°03′59″N 1°47′32″W		1023550	Upload Photo	Q26274533
89 and 91, Brown Street	II	89 and 91, Brown Street			SU1465429690; 51°03′59″N 1°47′32″W		1248921	Upload Photo	Q26541100
90 and 92, Brown Street	II	90 and 92, Brown Street			SU1462929707; 51°03′59″N 1°47′33″W		1248848	Upload Photo	Q26541035
Priory Lodge	II	93, Brown Street			SU1465829672; 51°03′58″N 1°47′32″W		1355857	Upload Photo	Q26638575
The Priory	II	95, Brown Street			SU1466929661; 51°03′58″N 1°47′31″W		1248930	Upload Photo	Q26541109
Red Lion Hotel the Red Lion Hotel	II	Brown Street	hotel		SU1459129900; 51°04′06″N 1°47′35″W		1242887	Red Lion Hotel the Red Lion Hotel More images	Q26535611
9 and 11, Butcher Row	II	9 and 11, Butcher Row			SU1446929959; 51°04′08″N 1°47′42″W		1023551	9 and 11, Butcher Row More images	Q26274534
5, Market Place	II	10, Butcher Row			SU1445129974; 51°04′08″N 1°47′42″W		1242758	5, Market Place More images	Q26535503
6 and 7, Ox Row	II	12 and 14, Butcher Row			SU1444729972; 51°04′08″N 1°47′43″W		1242759	6 and 7, Ox Row More images	Q26535504
33, Butcher Row	II	33, Butcher Row			SU1440629943; 51°04′07″N 1°47′45″W		1355858	33, Butcher Row More images	Q26638576
Ivy Place	II	1-3, Castle Street			SU1435030279; 51°04′18″N 1°47′48″W		1249015	Upload Photo	Q26681313
Market House Chambers Martins Bank	II*	1, Castle Street			SU1432330126; 51°04′13″N 1°47′49″W		1023552	Upload Photo	Q17534594
Avon View	II	2, Castle Street			SU1434730346; 51°04′20″N 1°47′48″W		1249051	Upload Photo	Q26541217
Ivy Place	II	4-11, Castle Street			SU1431630279; 51°04′18″N 1°47′49″W		1023561	Upload Photo	Q26274544
26, Castle Street	II	26, Castle Street			SU1438030170; 51°04′14″N 1°47′46″W		1249109	Upload Photo	Q26541272
27, 29 and 29a, Castle Street	II	27, 29 and 29a, Castle Street			SU1434430158; 51°04′14″N 1°47′48″W		1355859	Upload Photo	Q26638577
31-35, Castle Street	II	31-35, Castle Street			SU1433730177; 51°04′15″N 1°47′48″W		1023553	Upload Photo	Q26274536
41, Castle Street	II	41, Castle Street			SU1435330199; 51°04′15″N 1°47′47″W		1023554	Upload Photo	Q26274537
43, Castle Street	II	43, Castle Street			SU1435030208; 51°04′16″N 1°47′48″W		1023556	Upload Photo	Q26274539
45, Castle Street	II*	45, Castle Street			SU1434430214; 51°04′16″N 1°47′48″W		1023557	45, Castle Street	Q17534605
47, Castle Street	II	47, Castle Street			SU1435130223; 51°04′16″N 1°47′48″W		1023558	Upload Photo	Q26274540
49, Castle Street	II	49, Castle Street			SU1435330230; 51°04′16″N 1°47′47″W		1023559	Upload Photo	Q26274542
52-58, Castle Street	II	52-58, Castle Street			SU1438430260; 51°04′17″N 1°47′46″W		1277589	Upload Photo	Q26566995
60, Castle Street	II	60, Castle Street			SU1438530276; 51°04′18″N 1°47′46″W		1023567	Upload Photo	Q26274550
62 and 64, Castle Street	II	62 and 64, Castle Street			SU1438430282; 51°04′18″N 1°47′46″W		1355864	Upload Photo	Q26638580
63 and 65, Castle Street	II	63 and 65, Castle Street			SU1435430266; 51°04′18″N 1°47′47″W		1277654	Upload Photo	Q26567054
67,67a and 67b, Castle Street	II	67, 67a and 67b, Castle Street			SU1435730276; 51°04′18″N 1°47′47″W		1023560	Upload Photo	Q26274543
77, Castle Street	II	77, Castle Street			SU1436130308; 51°04′19″N 1°47′47″W		1023562	Upload Photo	Q26274545
81, Castle Street (see Details for Further Address Information)	II	79, Castle Street			SU1435830320; 51°04′19″N 1°47′47″W		1249046	Upload Photo	Q26541213
George and Dragon Public House	II*	83, Castle Street	pub		SU1436230340; 51°04′20″N 1°47′47″W		1355860	George and Dragon Public House More images	Q17546413
91, Castle Street	II*	91, Castle Street			SU1436230346; 51°04′20″N 1°47′47″W		1023563	91, Castle Street	Q17534616
93, Castle Street	II*	93, Castle Street			SU1436330351; 51°04′20″N 1°47′47″W		1355861	93, Castle Street	Q17546417
95, Castle Street	II	95, Castle Street			SU1436430357; 51°04′21″N 1°47′47″W		1249061	Upload Photo	Q26541227
2 K6 Telephone Kiosks	II	Castle Street			SU1437230170; 51°04′14″N 1°47′47″W		1272844	Upload Photo	Q26562650
Screen Wall, Rails and Gates at Entrance to Hussey's Almshouses	II	Castle Street			SU1437030375; 51°04′21″N 1°47′47″W		1355862	Upload Photo	Q26638578
Forecourt Railings and Gate of No 26	II	Castle Street			SU1437230168; 51°04′14″N 1°47′47″W		1355863	Upload Photo	Q26638579
Former Store to Rear of No 41 Across Small Yard	II	Castle Street			SU1433930200; 51°04′15″N 1°47′48″W		1023555	Upload Photo	Q26274538
Numbbers 4-14 Hussey's Almshouses	II	Castle Street			SU1433830384; 51°04′21″N 1°47′48″W		1249073	Upload Photo	Q26681317
Number 3 Hussey's Almshouses, Screen Wall and Plaque to South of No 3	II	Castle Street			SU1436830366; 51°04′21″N 1°47′47″W		1023565	Upload Photo	Q26274547
Numbers 1 and 2 Hussey's Almshouses	II	Castle Street			SU1436030366; 51°04′21″N 1°47′47″W		1023564	Upload Photo	Q26274546
The Chough Hotel Including Blocks on East Side of Yard and Over Entrance from Blue Boar Row	II	Castle Street	hotel		SU1437330089; 51°04′12″N 1°47′46″W		1277611	The Chough Hotel Including Blocks on East Side of Yard and Over Entrance from Blue Boar Row More images	Q26567013
The Post Office	II	Castle Street			SU1440430157; 51°04′14″N 1°47′45″W		1023566	Upload Photo	Q26274549
1 and 3, Catherine Street	II	1 and 3, Catherine Street			SU1455229935; 51°04′07″N 1°47′37″W		1277564	Upload Photo	Q26566970
2 and 4, Catherine Street	II	2 and 4, Catherine Street			SU1452229926; 51°04′07″N 1°47′39″W		1023573	Upload Photo	Q26274558
6-10, Catherine Street	II	6-10, Catherine Street			SU1452329906; 51°04′06″N 1°47′39″W		1355828	Upload Photo	Q26638557
7 and 7a, Catherine Street	II	7 and 7a, Catherine Street			SU1454929916; 51°04′06″N 1°47′37″W		1023570	Upload Photo	Q26274555
9-15, Catherine Street	II	9-15, Catherine Street			SU1455029911; 51°04′06″N 1°47′37″W		1249151	Upload Photo	Q26541313
14, Catherine Street (see Details for Further Address Information)	II	12, Catherine Street			SU1452429899; 51°04′06″N 1°47′39″W		1023574	Upload Photo	Q26274559
17 and 19, Catherine Street	II*	17 and 19, Catherine Street			SU1455529889; 51°04′05″N 1°47′37″W		1355866	17 and 19, Catherine Street	Q17546428
26 and 28, Catherine Street	II	26 and 28, Catherine Street			SU1452629866; 51°04′05″N 1°47′39″W		1023575	Upload Photo	Q26274560
27 and 29, Catherine Street	II	27 and 29, Catherine Street			SU1455429858; 51°04′04″N 1°47′37″W		1243635	Upload Photo	Q26536302
30, Catherine Street	II	30, Catherine Street			SU1452529856; 51°04′04″N 1°47′39″W		1355829	Upload Photo	Q26638558
31, Catherine Street	II	31, Catherine Street			SU1455429851; 51°04′04″N 1°47′37″W		1023571	Upload Photo	Q26274556
38, Catherine Street	II*	38, Catherine Street			SU1451829832; 51°04′04″N 1°47′39″W		1023576	38, Catherine Street	Q17534625
45-49, Catherine Street	II	45-49, Catherine Street, SP1 2DH			SU1456429793; 51°04′02″N 1°47′37″W		1023572	Upload Photo	Q26274557
46 and 48, Catherine Street	II	46 and 48, Catherine Street			SU1452629817; 51°04′03″N 1°47′39″W		1023577	Upload Photo	Q26274561
50, Catherine Street	II	50, Catherine Street			SU1453429802; 51°04′03″N 1°47′38″W		1023578	Upload Photo	Q26274562
Bell and Crown Inn	II*	59, Catherine Street (E Side)	pub		SU1456529771; 51°04′02″N 1°47′37″W		1355827	Bell and Crown Inn More images	Q17546364
Midland Bank	II	25, Cheese Market			SU1435730023; 51°04′10″N 1°47′47″W		1259894	Upload Photo	Q26550972
26, Market Place (see Details for Further Address Information)	II	26, Cheese Market			SU1434730020; 51°04′10″N 1°47′48″W		1023700	Upload Photo	Q26274652
27, Cheese Market (see Details for Further Address Information)	II	27, Cheese Market			SU1434030011; 51°04′09″N 1°47′48″W		1023701	Upload Photo	Q26274653
28 and 28a, Market Place (see Details for Further Address Information)	II	28 and 28a, Cheese Market			SU1432830027; 51°04′10″N 1°47′49″W		1242688	Upload Photo	Q26535447
British Legion	II	29, Cheese Market			SU1431730050; 51°04′11″N 1°47′49″W		1242690	Upload Photo	Q26535449
31 and 31a, Market Place (see Details for Further Address Information)	II*	31 and 31a, Cheese Market			SU1433030038; 51°04′10″N 1°47′49″W		1242703	Upload Photo	Q17543764
32, Cheese Market (see Details for Further Address Information)	II	32, Cheese Market			SU1433230047; 51°04′10″N 1°47′49″W		1242715	Upload Photo	Q26535472
The Market Hall	II	Cheese Market	library		SU1432430065; 51°04′11″N 1°47′49″W		1259888	The Market Hall More images	Q26550967
26 to 34, Chipper Lane	II	26-34, Chipper Lane			SU1443630136; 51°04′13″N 1°47′43″W		1023579	Upload Photo	Q26274564
Public Library Young Gallery	II	Chipper Lane			SU1443130162; 51°04′14″N 1°47′43″W		1023580	Upload Photo	Q26274565
The King and Bishop	II	76, Crane Street	building		SU1425729815; 51°04′03″N 1°47′52″W		1023639	The King and Bishop More images	Q26274599
82 and 84 Crane Street	II*	82 and 84, Crane Street			SU1423629824; 51°04′03″N 1°47′54″W		1023640	82 and 84 Crane Street	Q17534853
86, Crane Street	II*	86, Crane Street			SU1422529826; 51°04′03″N 1°47′54″W		1023641	Upload Photo	Q17534864
87 and 89, Crane Street	II*	87 and 89, Crane Street	building		SU1423829794; 51°04′02″N 1°47′53″W		1355820	87 and 89, Crane Street More images	Q17546354
90-96, Crane Street	II	90-96, Crane Street			SU1421229822; 51°04′03″N 1°47′55″W		1023642	Upload Photo	Q26274600
91, Crane Street	I	91, Crane Street	building		SU1422529797; 51°04′02″N 1°47′54″W		1355821	91, Crane Street More images	Q17530019
Staynings	II*	93, Crane Street			SU1421329799; 51°04′02″N 1°47′55″W		1023636	Staynings	Q17534834
95, Crane Street	II	95, Crane Street			SU1420129801; 51°04′03″N 1°47′55″W		1355822	95, Crane Street More images	Q26638553
97, Crane Street	II*	97, Crane Street			SU1419029806; 51°04′03″N 1°47′56″W		1023637	97, Crane Street More images	Q17534844
Church House Incorporating Audley House	I	99 and 101, Crane Street	house		SU1416229803; 51°04′03″N 1°47′57″W		1023638	Church House Incorporating Audley House More images	Q17529294
Crane Bridge	I	Crane Street	road bridge		SU1414829835; 51°04′04″N 1°47′58″W		1240793	Crane Bridge More images	Q17529703
1-6, De Vaux Place	II	1-6, De Vaux Place			SU1430029219; 51°03′44″N 1°47′50″W		1023643	Upload Photo	Q26274601
7, De Vaux Place	II	7, De Vaux Place			SU1435729232; 51°03′44″N 1°47′47″W		1023644	Upload Photo	Q26274603
De Vaux Lodge	II	9, De Vaux Place			SU1433329187; 51°03′43″N 1°47′49″W		1023645	Upload Photo	Q26274604
Rear Garden Wall of No 9	II	De Vaux Place			SU1431629166; 51°03′42″N 1°47′50″W		1260792	Upload Photo	Q26551785
109, Dolphin Street	II	109, Dolphin Street			SU1481829721; 51°04′00″N 1°47′24″W		1240910	Upload Photo	Q26533806
111-115, Dolphin Street	II	111-115, Dolphin Street			SU1481829716; 51°04′00″N 1°47′24″W		1023646	Upload Photo	Q26274605
117 and 119, Dolphin Street	II	117 and 119, Dolphin Street			SU1482129702; 51°03′59″N 1°47′24″W		1355824	Upload Photo	Q26638555
12, Endless Street	II	12, Endless Street			SU1450930145; 51°04′14″N 1°47′39″W		1023648	Upload Photo	Q26274607
Police Station	II	13, Endless Street			SU1448530127; 51°04′13″N 1°47′41″W		1260265	Upload Photo	Q26551300
14, Endless Street	II	14, Endless Street	building		SU1450630166; 51°04′14″N 1°47′40″W		1240919	14, Endless Street More images	Q26533815
Loder House	II*	16, Endless Street			SU1450730181; 51°04′15″N 1°47′40″W		1355825	Loder House	Q17546359
18 and 20, Endless Street	II	18 and 20, Endless Street			SU1449930196; 51°04′15″N 1°47′40″W		1260763	Upload Photo	Q26551757
19, Endless Street	II	19, Endless Street			SU1448030183; 51°04′15″N 1°47′41″W		1023653	Upload Photo	Q26274612
21, Endless Street	II	21, Endless Street			SU1448030190; 51°04′15″N 1°47′41″W		1023654	Upload Photo	Q26274613
22 and 24, Endless Street	II	22 and 24, Endless Street			SU1449830208; 51°04′16″N 1°47′40″W		1023649	Upload Photo	Q26274608
45, Endless Street	II	45, Endless Street			SU1446930259; 51°04′17″N 1°47′42″W		1241936	Upload Photo	Q26534776
47, Endless Street and 1 Fulford Place	II	1 Fulford Place, SP1 3BB			SU1446730271; 51°04′18″N 1°47′42″W		1355790	Upload Photo	Q26638531
52, Endless Street (see Details for Further Address Information)	II*	52, Endless Street			SU1449030292; 51°04′18″N 1°47′40″W		1023650	Upload Photo	Q17534874
56, Endless Street	II	56, Endless Street			SU1448530309; 51°04′19″N 1°47′41″W		1023651	Upload Photo	Q26274609
60-64, Endless Street	II	60-64, Endless Street			SU1448030315; 51°04′19″N 1°47′41″W		1260293	Upload Photo	Q26551325
66-70, Endless Street	II	66-70, Endless Street			SU1447730325; 51°04′19″N 1°47′41″W		1355788	Upload Photo	Q26638529
72, Endless Street	II	72, Endless Street			SU1447730341; 51°04′20″N 1°47′41″W		1241914	Upload Photo	Q26534755
74, Endless Street	II	74, Endless Street			SU1447430350; 51°04′20″N 1°47′41″W		1023652	Upload Photo	Q26274610
76, Endless Street	II	76, Endless Street			SU1445430401; 51°04′22″N 1°47′42″W		1355789	Upload Photo	Q26638530
26 Endless Street (including Former Nos 28 and 30)	II	Endless Street			SU1449530218; 51°04′16″N 1°47′40″W		1355826	Upload Photo	Q26638556
Garden Wall to East of No 26 Endless Street	II	Endless Street			SU1455830236; 51°04′17″N 1°47′37″W		1240930	Upload Photo	Q26533826
76 and 77, Exeter Street	II	76 and 77, Exeter Street			SU1456829585; 51°03′56″N 1°47′37″W		1023655	Upload Photo	Q26274614
81 and 82, Exeter Street	II	81 and 82, Exeter Street			SU1456429561; 51°03′55″N 1°47′37″W		1355791	Upload Photo	Q26638532
83-85, Exeter Street	II	83-85, Exeter Street			SU1456529557; 51°03′55″N 1°47′37″W		1241983	Upload Photo	Q26534822
86 and 87, Exeter Street	II	86 and 87, Exeter Street			SU1456229544; 51°03′54″N 1°47′37″W		1023656	Upload Photo	Q26274615
90 and 91, Exeter Street	II	90 and 91, Exeter Street			SU1455829526; 51°03′54″N 1°47′37″W		1023657	Upload Photo	Q26274616
95 and 96, Exeter Street	II*	95 and 96, Exeter Street			SU1455229482; 51°03′52″N 1°47′37″W		1023658	Upload Photo	Q17538943
99 and 100, Exeter Street	II	99 and 100, Exeter Street			SU1454729454; 51°03′51″N 1°47′38″W		1355793	Upload Photo	Q26638534
101-104, Exeter Street	II	101-104, Exeter Street			SU1454529446; 51°03′51″N 1°47′38″W		1023659	Upload Photo	Q26274617
105-107, Exeter Street	II	105-107, Exeter Street			SU1454929435; 51°03′51″N 1°47′38″W		1355794	Upload Photo	Q26638535
108, Exeter Street	II*	108, Exeter Street, SP1 2SF			SU1453729422; 51°03′50″N 1°47′38″W		1023660	Upload Photo	Q17538970
109a 109b and 109, Exeter Street	II*	109a 109b and 109, Exeter Street			SU1453129414; 51°03′50″N 1°47′38″W		1023661	Upload Photo	Q17538987
110, Exeter Street	II	110, Exeter Street			SU1454529405; 51°03′50″N 1°47′38″W		1023662	Upload Photo	Q26274618
111 and 112, Exeter Street	II	111 and 112, Exeter Street			SU1454429400; 51°03′50″N 1°47′38″W		1023663	Upload Photo	Q26274619
St Elizabeth's Convent and St Osmund's Roman Catholic Primary School	II*	131, Exeter Street			SU1450929217; 51°03′44″N 1°47′40″W		1023664	Upload Photo	Q17539002
Church of St Osmund (roman Catholic)	II	Exeter Street	church building		SU1455529498; 51°03′53″N 1°47′37″W		1241985	Church of St Osmund (roman Catholic) More images	Q26534824
Old Bell Inn St Ane's Garage	II	Exeter Street			SU1457429623; 51°03′57″N 1°47′36″W		1241964	Upload Photo	Q26534803
St Osmund's Church School	II	Exeter Street			SU1456329512; 51°03′53″N 1°47′37″W		1355792	Upload Photo	Q26638533
3, Fish Row	II*	3, Fish Row			SU1449929962; 51°04′08″N 1°47′40″W		1023665	3, Fish Row More images	Q17539021
The Wheatsheaf Inn	II	7 and 9, Fish Row			SU1448829957; 51°04′08″N 1°47′41″W		1023666	The Wheatsheaf Inn More images	Q26274620
36, Milford Street	II	34, Gigant Street			SU1469329921; 51°04′06″N 1°47′30″W		1242971	Upload Photo	Q26535689
The Anchor Inn	II	38, Gigant Street			SU1469829882; 51°04′05″N 1°47′30″W		1023673	Upload Photo	Q26274628
119-123, Gigant Street	II	119-123, Gigant Street			SU1474229761; 51°04′01″N 1°47′28″W		1242186	Upload Photo	Q26534999
Barley Mow Public House	II	71, Greencroft Street			SU1474030172; 51°04′14″N 1°47′28″W		1023674	Upload Photo	Q26274629
85, Greencroft Street	II	85, Greencroft Street			SU1472630246; 51°04′17″N 1°47′28″W		1023675	Upload Photo	Q26274630
1-5, Guilder Lane	II	1-5, Guilder Lane			SU1477830018; 51°04′09″N 1°47′26″W		1355801	Upload Photo	Q26638540
2-14, Guilder Lane (see Details for Further Address Information)	II	2-14, Guilder Lane			SU1476330020; 51°04′10″N 1°47′26″W		1242209	Upload Photo	Q26535021
15 and 17, Guilder Lane	II*	15 and 17, Guilder Lane			SU1478529988; 51°04′09″N 1°47′25″W		1243456	15 and 17, Guilder Lane	Q17543839
Barclays Bank	II	2-6, High Street			SU1428829926; 51°04′07″N 1°47′51″W		1355804	Upload Photo	Q26638543
8 and 10, High Street	II	8 and 10, High Street			SU1428829916; 51°04′06″N 1°47′51″W		1023680	Upload Photo	Q26274636
11 and 13, High Street	II*	11 and 13, High Street			SU1430729865; 51°04′05″N 1°47′50″W		1355805	11 and 13, High Street More images	Q17546345
14 and 16, High Street	II	14 and 16, High Street			SU1428529906; 51°04′06″N 1°47′51″W		1023681	Upload Photo	Q26274637
The Old George Inn	I	15 and 17, High Street	inn		SU1430329852; 51°04′04″N 1°47′50″W		1242383	The Old George Inn More images	Q17529708
18, High Street	II	18, High Street			SU1428429901; 51°04′06″N 1°47′51″W		1243544	Upload Photo	Q26536216
25, High Street	II	25, High Street			SU1430129829; 51°04′03″N 1°47′50″W		1023689	25, High Street More images	Q26274642
27, High Street	II	27, High Street			SU1430029824; 51°04′03″N 1°47′50″W		1260056	27, High Street More images	Q26551118
29 and 31, High Street	II	29 and 31, High Street			SU1429729817; 51°04′03″N 1°47′50″W		1023690	Upload Photo	Q26274643
32, High Street	II	32, High Street			SU1427029866; 51°04′05″N 1°47′52″W		1023682	Upload Photo	Q26274638
Mitre Corner	II	37, High Street			SU1429329791; 51°04′02″N 1°47′51″W		1355806	Mitre Corner More images	Q26638544
39, High Street	II	39, High Street			SU1428929789; 51°04′02″N 1°47′51″W		1260029	Upload Photo	Q26551093
High Street	II	40, High Street			SU1427129843; 51°04′04″N 1°47′52″W		1023683	High Street More images	Q26274639
41-45, High Street	II	41-45, High Street			SU1428629779; 51°04′02″N 1°47′51″W		1023691	Upload Photo	Q26274645
42 and 44, High Street	II	42 and 44, High Street			SU1426629835; 51°04′04″N 1°47′52″W		1023684	42 and 44, High Street More images	Q26274640
Close Gate	II*	47, High Street			SU1429729774; 51°04′02″N 1°47′50″W		1260032	Upload Photo	Q17544185
49 and 51, High Street	II	49 and 51, High Street			SU1427929764; 51°04′01″N 1°47′51″W		1355768	Upload Photo	Q26638510
50, High Street	II	50, High Street			SU1427029812; 51°04′03″N 1°47′52″W		1023685	50, High Street More images	Q26274641
52 and 54, High Street	II*	52 and 54, High Street	building		SU1426029795; 51°04′02″N 1°47′52″W		1023686	52 and 54, High Street More images	Q17539038
56 and 58, High Street	II*	56 and 58, High Street			SU1426529782; 51°04′02″N 1°47′52″W		1023687	56 and 58, High Street	Q17539066
64, High Street	II*	64, High Street			SU1426329762; 51°04′01″N 1°47′52″W		1023688	Upload Photo	Q17539086
2 and 4, Ivy Street	II	2 and 4, Ivy Street			SU1460729740; 51°04′01″N 1°47′34″W		1023692	Upload Photo	Q26274646
Queens Arms Public House	II	7, Ivy Street	pub		SU1461629764; 51°04′01″N 1°47′34″W		1242435	Queens Arms Public House More images	Q26535224
The City Arms Inn	II	10, Market Place	inn		SU1442329969; 51°04′08″N 1°47′44″W		1259882	The City Arms Inn More images	Q26550961
13, Market Place	II*	13, Market Place			SU1440229966; 51°04′08″N 1°47′45″W		1242773	13, Market Place More images	Q17543781
16 and 17, Market Place	II*	16 and 17, Market Place	building		SU1438229981; 51°04′08″N 1°47′46″W		1242726	16 and 17, Market Place More images	Q17543775
18 and 19, Market Place	II	18 and 19, Market Place			SU1438329993; 51°04′09″N 1°47′46″W		1242733	18 and 19, Market Place More images	Q26535485
Salisbury War Memorial and Railings	II	Market Place	war memorial		SU1448830028; 51°04′10″N 1°47′41″W		1400920	Salisbury War Memorial and Railings More images	Q26675454
Statue to Henry Fawcett	II	Market Place	statue		SU1442830042; 51°04′10″N 1°47′44″W		1039133	Statue to Henry Fawcett More images	Q26290918
The Guildhall	II*	Market Place	building		SU1449729985; 51°04′08″N 1°47′40″W		1242739	The Guildhall More images	Q17543778
New Sarum House	II	Market Square			SU1438030027; 51°04′10″N 1°47′46″W		1245580	New Sarum House More images	Q26538096
The Oldfellows Arms	II	6, Milford Street	pub		SU1458129931; 51°04′07″N 1°47′36″W		1259808	The Oldfellows Arms More images	Q26550895
11, Milford Street	II	11, Milford Street			SU1457129966; 51°04′08″N 1°47′36″W		1242982	Upload Photo	Q26535699
13, Milford Street	II	13, Milford Street			SU1457629966; 51°04′08″N 1°47′36″W		1242983	Upload Photo	Q26535700
14 and 16, Milford Street (see Details for Further Address Information)	II	14 and 16, Milford Street			SU1460129937; 51°04′07″N 1°47′35″W		1242914	Upload Photo	Q26535635
15 and 17, Milford Street	II	15 and 17, Milford Street			SU1458929966; 51°04′08″N 1°47′35″W		1242993	Upload Photo	Q26535710
20, Milford Street	II	20, Milford Street			SU1462829935; 51°04′07″N 1°47′33″W		1242924	Upload Photo	Q26535644
21 21a and 21b, Milford Street	II*	21 21a and 21b, Milford Street			SU1463129960; 51°04′08″N 1°47′33″W		1258040	21 21a and 21b, Milford Street	Q17544112
22 and 24, Milford Street	II	22 and 24, Milford Street			SU1463529934; 51°04′07″N 1°47′33″W		1259810	Upload Photo	Q26550897
The Milford Arms	II*	23 and 25, Milford Street			SU1464629958; 51°04′08″N 1°47′32″W		1258053	The Milford Arms	Q17544115
26, Milford Street	II	26, Milford Street			SU1464329931; 51°04′07″N 1°47′33″W		1242939	Upload Photo	Q26535657
27 and 29, Milford Street	II	27 and 29, Milford Street			SU1465929956; 51°04′08″N 1°47′32″W		1259776	Upload Photo	Q26550869
28, Milford Street	II	28, Milford Street			SU1464929931; 51°04′07″N 1°47′32″W		1242940	Upload Photo	Q26535658
30, Milford Street	II	30, Milford Street			SU1465429934; 51°04′07″N 1°47′32″W		1242963	Upload Photo	Q26535681
Catherine Wheel Public House	II*	31, Milford Street			SU1467429952; 51°04′07″N 1°47′31″W		1259777	Upload Photo	Q17544173
William IV Public House	II*	32, Milford Street			SU1465829924; 51°04′06″N 1°47′32″W		1259805	William IV Public House	Q17544179
34, Milford Street	II	34, Milford Street			SU1466829928; 51°04′07″N 1°47′31″W		1259781	Upload Photo	Q26550872
35-39, Milford Street	II	35-39, Milford Street			SU1469129948; 51°04′07″N 1°47′30″W		1259756	Upload Photo	Q26550849
43, Pennyfarthing Street (see Details for Further Address Information)	II	41, Milford Street			SU1471429945; 51°04′07″N 1°47′29″W		1258072	Upload Photo	Q26549358
42, Milford Street	II	42, Milford Street			SU1471929920; 51°04′06″N 1°47′29″W		1242973	Upload Photo	Q26535691
44 and 46, Milford Street	II	44 and 46, Milford Street			SU1472829921; 51°04′06″N 1°47′28″W		1259782	Upload Photo	Q26550873
58, Milford Street (see Details for Further Address Information)	II	56, Milford Street			SU1475429909; 51°04′06″N 1°47′27″W		1259783	Upload Photo	Q26550874
57 57a and 59, Milford Street	II	57 57a and 59, Milford Street			SU1476529934; 51°04′07″N 1°47′26″W		1258077	Upload Photo	Q26549362
61, Milford Street	II	61, Milford Street			SU1477429933; 51°04′07″N 1°47′26″W		1258078	Upload Photo	Q26549363
65, Milford Street	II	65, Milford Street			SU1479429932; 51°04′07″N 1°47′25″W		1259761	Upload Photo	Q26550854
Cathedral Hotel	II	Milford Street	hotel		SU1455529970; 51°04′08″N 1°47′37″W		1259785	Cathedral Hotel More images	Q26550876
Elim Pentecostal Church and Attached Gate	II	Milford Street	architectural structure		SU1467929920; 51°04′06″N 1°47′31″W		1243577	Elim Pentecostal Church and Attached Gate More images	Q26536245
Freestanding Overthrow in Fornt of Entrance to Red Lion Hotel	II	Milford Street			SU1456629940; 51°04′07″N 1°47′37″W		1259811	Upload Photo	Q26550898
The Haunch of Venison	II*	1, Minster Street, SP1 1TB	pub		SU1436029961; 51°04′08″N 1°47′47″W		1273531	The Haunch of Venison More images	Q17545912
3 and 5, Minster Street	II*	3 and 5, Minster Street	building		SU1436129970; 51°04′08″N 1°47′47″W		1258203	3 and 5, Minster Street More images	Q17544119
7-17, Minster Street	II*	7-17, Minster Street	building		SU1436129992; 51°04′09″N 1°47′47″W		1258214	7-17, Minster Street More images	Q17544122
South Electricity	II	17, New Canal			SU1446029907; 51°04′06″N 1°47′42″W		1273524	Upload Photo	Q26563261
Southern Gas	II	19, New Canal			SU1444629910; 51°04′06″N 1°47′43″W		1258241	Upload Photo	Q26549497
35 and 37, New Canal	II	35 and 37, New Canal			SU1439029893; 51°04′05″N 1°47′46″W		1258246	35 and 37, New Canal More images	Q26549501
39, New Canal	II	39, New Canal			SU1438429892; 51°04′05″N 1°47′46″W		1258287	Upload Photo	Q26549538
45, New Canal	II	45, New Canal			SU1436729890; 51°04′05″N 1°47′47″W		1258295	Upload Photo	Q26549545
47, New Canal	II	47, New Canal			SU1436029883; 51°04′05″N 1°47′47″W		1258299	Upload Photo	Q26549548
49, New Canal (see Details for Further Address Information)	II*	49, New Canal			SU1435129880; 51°04′05″N 1°47′48″W		1258309	49, New Canal (see Details for Further Address Information)	Q17544124
John Halle's Hall (now Forming Entrance to the Odeon Cinema)	I	New Canal	movie theater		SU1447229911; 51°04′06″N 1°47′41″W		1258229	John Halle's Hall (now Forming Entrance to the Odeon Cinema) More images	Q17529775
Odeon Cinema (to Rear of John Halle's Hall)	II	New Canel			SU1448629865; 51°04′05″N 1°47′41″W		1243555	Upload Photo	Q26536225
1, New Street	II	1, New Street	pub		SU1448729756; 51°04′01″N 1°47′41″W		1258311	1, New Street More images	Q26549559
3 and 5, New Street	II	3 and 5, New Street			SU1447429758; 51°04′01″N 1°47′41″W		1258327	Upload Photo	Q26549575
School of Arts Annexe	I	4, New Street	school building		SU1451729781; 51°04′02″N 1°47′39″W		1366014	School of Arts Annexe More images	Q17530137
6 Bollards in Front of No 4	II	6 Bollards In Front Of No 4, New Street			SU1450629770; 51°04′01″N 1°47′40″W		1366020	Upload Photo	Q26647654
7, New Street	II	7, New Street			SU1446629762; 51°04′01″N 1°47′42″W		1258328	Upload Photo	Q26549576
9 and 11, New Street	II	9 and 11, New Street			SU1445829762; 51°04′01″N 1°47′42″W		1258334	Upload Photo	Q26549581
21-27, New Street	II	21-27, New Street			SU1437129798; 51°04′02″N 1°47′47″W		1273468	Upload Photo	Q26563212
29, New Street	II	29, New Street			SU1442129769; 51°04′01″N 1°47′44″W		1273475	Upload Photo	Q26563219
31, New Street	II	31, New Street			SU1441129769; 51°04′01″N 1°47′45″W		1258362	Upload Photo	Q26549607
33, New Street	II*	33, New Street			SU1440429769; 51°04′01″N 1°47′45″W		1258363	33, New Street	Q17544127
35, New Street	II	35, New Street			SU1439629770; 51°04′02″N 1°47′45″W		1258366	Upload Photo	Q26549610
37 and 39, New Street	II	37 and 39, New Street			SU1438729774; 51°04′02″N 1°47′46″W		1258367	Upload Photo	Q26549611
The New Inn	II*	41-45, New Street	inn		SU1437629776; 51°04′02″N 1°47′46″W		1258368	The New Inn More images	Q17544131
The Old House Restaurant	II	47 and 49, New Street			SU1436229778; 51°04′02″N 1°47′47″W		1258372	Upload Photo	Q26549615
61 and 63, New Street	II	61 and 63, New Street			SU1433029784; 51°04′02″N 1°47′49″W		1273457	Upload Photo	Q26563202
67 and 69, New Street	II	67 and 69, New Street			SU1431029788; 51°04′02″N 1°47′50″W		1258399	Upload Photo	Q26549636
71, New Street	II	71, New Street			SU1430429788; 51°04′02″N 1°47′50″W		1258406	Upload Photo	Q26549642
73, New Street	II	73, New Street			SU1430029789; 51°04′02″N 1°47′50″W		1258408	Upload Photo	Q26549643
75, New Street	II	75, New Street			SU1429729791; 51°04′02″N 1°47′50″W		1258417	Upload Photo	Q26549652
School of Arts and Crafts	II	New Street	school building		SU1434929776; 51°04′02″N 1°47′48″W		1273453	School of Arts and Crafts More images	Q26563198
International Stores, the Poultry Cross	II*	The Poultry Cross, 15, Market Place	architectural structure		SU1437929972; 51°04′08″N 1°47′46″W		1242725	International Stores, the Poultry Cross More images	Q17543767
53, Payne's Hill	II*	53, Payne's Hill			SU1481629738; 51°04′00″N 1°47′24″W		1258443	53, Payne's Hill	Q17544135
6, Pennyfarthing Street	II	6, Pennyfarthing Street			SU1468630024; 51°04′10″N 1°47′30″W		1258446	Upload Photo	Q26549679
8-14, Pennyfarthing Street	II	8-14, Pennyfarthing Street			SU1468630019; 51°04′10″N 1°47′30″W		1258448	Upload Photo	Q26549681
16, Pennyfarthing Street	II	16, Pennyfarthing Street			SU1468630002; 51°04′09″N 1°47′30″W		1258449	Upload Photo	Q26549682
1, Queen Street	II*	1, Queen Street			SU1451329958; 51°04′08″N 1°47′39″W		1258452	1, Queen Street More images	Q17544138
6 and 7, Queen Street	II	6 and 7, Queen Street			SU1453529970; 51°04′08″N 1°47′38″W		1258510	6 and 7, Queen Street More images	Q26549736
8, Queen Street	II*	8, Queen Street	building		SU1453429978; 51°04′08″N 1°47′38″W		1273412	8, Queen Street More images	Q17545905
9, Queen Street	II	9, Queen Street			SU1453329985; 51°04′08″N 1°47′38″W		1258516	9, Queen Street More images	Q26549740
10, Queen Street	II	10, Queen Street			SU1453129991; 51°04′09″N 1°47′38″W		1258525	10, Queen Street More images	Q26549749
11 and 12, Queen Street	II	11 and 12, Queen Street			SU1452829997; 51°04′09″N 1°47′39″W		1273418	11 and 12, Queen Street More images	Q26563163
14, Queen Street	II*	14, Queen Street			SU1452830001; 51°04′09″N 1°47′39″W		1258661	14, Queen Street More images	Q17544141
15 and 16, Queen Street	II*	15 and 16, Queen Street			SU1454830014; 51°04′09″N 1°47′37″W		1258686	Upload Photo	Q17544143
17 and 18, Queen Street	II*	17 and 18, Queen Street	building		SU1452730014; 51°04′09″N 1°47′39″W		1258697	17 and 18, Queen Street More images	Q17544144
20, Queen Street (see Details for Further Address Information)	II*	19, Queen Street			SU1452430031; 51°04′10″N 1°47′39″W		1273319	20, Queen Street (see Details for Further Address Information)	Q17545898
21, Queen Street	II	21, Queen Street	house		SU1452730042; 51°04′10″N 1°47′39″W		1258721	21, Queen Street More images	Q26549927
Victoria Hall, 12 and 14, Rollestone Street	II*	12 and 14, Rollestone Street			SU1460030127; 51°04′13″N 1°47′35″W		1273287	Victoria Hall, 12 and 14, Rollestone Street	Q17545889
Salisbury Cycling Club	II	Rollestone Street			SU1456730162; 51°04′14″N 1°47′36″W		1243085	Upload Photo	Q26535792
2, Salt Lane	II*	2, Salt Lane			SU1455630162; 51°04′14″N 1°47′37″W		1243083	Upload Photo	Q17543790
9-15, Salt Lane	II	9-15, Salt Lane			SU1454230176; 51°04′15″N 1°47′38″W		1243115	Upload Photo	Q26535818
The Pheasant Inn and Crewe's Hall	II*	17 and 19, Salt Lane	inn		SU1455930177; 51°04′15″N 1°47′37″W		1243120	The Pheasant Inn and Crewe's Hall More images	Q17543804
51, Salt Lane	II	51, Salt Lane			SU1472430216; 51°04′16″N 1°47′28″W		1243125	Upload Photo	Q26535826
St Edmund's School	II*	School Lane			SU1458430349; 51°04′20″N 1°47′36″W		1273059	Upload Photo	Q17545830
36, Silver Street	II*	36, Silver Street	building		SU1436129954; 51°04′07″N 1°47′47″W		1243156	36, Silver Street More images	Q17543809
37, Silver Street	II	37, Silver Street			SU1439429930; 51°04′07″N 1°47′45″W		1273007	Upload Photo	Q26562797
38 and 40, Silver Street	II*	38 and 40, Silver Street			SU1435329951; 51°04′07″N 1°47′48″W		1243160	38 and 40, Silver Street	Q17543811
39, Silver Street	II	39, Silver Street			SU1438129934; 51°04′07″N 1°47′46″W		1273009	Upload Photo	Q26562799
41, Silver Street	II	41, Silver Street			SU1437429932; 51°04′07″N 1°47′46″W		1273010	41, Silver Street More images	Q26562800
42 and 44, Silver Street	II*	42 and 44, Silver Street			SU1434029949; 51°04′07″N 1°47′48″W		1243161	42 and 44, Silver Street	Q17543817
46 and 46a, Silver Street	II*	46 and 46a, Silver Street			SU1432929947; 51°04′07″N 1°47′49″W		1273027	46 and 46a, Silver Street	Q17545823
48-52, Silver Street	II*	48-52, Silver Street			SU1431529946; 51°04′07″N 1°47′49″W		1243171	48-52, Silver Street	Q17543820
51, Silver Street	II	51, Silver Street			SU1435029926; 51°04′07″N 1°47′48″W		1243177	Upload Photo	Q26535867
Stoke's Warehouse	II	53, Silver Street			SU1434329917; 51°04′06″N 1°47′48″W		1243192	Upload Photo	Q26535883
55-59, Silver Street	II	55-59, Silver Street			SU1432829921; 51°04′06″N 1°47′49″W		1272996	Upload Photo	Q26562787
The Poultry Cross	I	Silver Street	market cross		SU1438029956; 51°04′08″N 1°47′46″W		1243148	The Poultry Cross More images	Q15268323
1, St Ann Street	II	1, St Ann Street			SU1458529648; 51°03′58″N 1°47′36″W		1258728	Upload Photo	Q26549934
2, St Ann Street	II	2, St Ann Street			SU1458229622; 51°03′57″N 1°47′36″W		1258789	Upload Photo	Q26549992
3, St Ann Street	II	3, St Ann Street			SU1459329647; 51°03′58″N 1°47′35″W		1273300	Upload Photo	Q26563056
4, St Ann Street	II	4, St Ann Street			SU1458629622; 51°03′57″N 1°47′36″W		1273258	Upload Photo	Q26563018
5, St Ann Street	II	5, St Ann Street			SU1462929645; 51°03′57″N 1°47′33″W		1258748	Upload Photo	Q26549953
St Anne's Manor	II	6-10, St Ann Street			SU1459629621; 51°03′57″N 1°47′35″W		1258791	Upload Photo	Q26549994
97a, Brown Street	II	9, St Ann Street			SU1466129645; 51°03′57″N 1°47′32″W		1258751	Upload Photo	Q26549956
11, St Ann Street	II	11, St Ann Street			SU1466729644; 51°03′57″N 1°47′31″W		1273273	Upload Photo	Q26563032
12-16, St Ann Street	II	12-16, St Ann Street			SU1462029620; 51°03′57″N 1°47′34″W		1258809	Upload Photo	Q26550011
18, St Ann Street	II*	18, St Ann Street			SU1463329619; 51°03′57″N 1°47′33″W		1273272	Upload Photo	Q17545881
22, St Ann Street (see Details for Further Address Information)	II*	22, St Ann Street			SU1467829620; 51°03′57″N 1°47′31″W		1258815	22, St Ann Street (see Details for Further Address Information)	Q17544150
Albion Hotel	II	32, St Ann Street			SU1469529623; 51°03′57″N 1°47′30″W		1258821	Upload Photo	Q26550021
34 and 36, St Ann Street (see Details for Further Address Information)	II*	34 and 36, St Ann Street			SU1470929635; 51°03′57″N 1°47′29″W		1258823	Upload Photo	Q17544151
Salisbury Museum	II*	40 and 42, St Ann Street			SU1474329612; 51°03′56″N 1°47′28″W		1258828	Upload Photo	Q106916351
Vale House	II*	44, St Ann Street			SU1476129648; 51°03′58″N 1°47′27″W		1273247	Vale House	Q17545874
46, St Ann Street	II	46, St Ann Street			SU1477029652; 51°03′58″N 1°47′26″W		1258865	Upload Photo	Q26550058
48, St Ann Street	II	48, St Ann Street			SU1477729656; 51°03′58″N 1°47′26″W		1273232	Upload Photo	Q26562997
St Martin's House	II*	49, St Ann Street			SU1476829681; 51°03′59″N 1°47′26″W		1258755	St Martin's House	Q17544146
Conservative Club	II	50 and 52, St Ann Street			SU1478729641; 51°03′57″N 1°47′25″W		1258868	Upload Photo	Q26550061
Dolphin's Cottage	II	51, St Ann Street			SU1477729682; 51°03′59″N 1°47′26″W		1258758	Upload Photo	Q26549962
53-69, St Ann Street	II	53-69, St Ann Street			SU1484529702; 51°03′59″N 1°47′22″W		1258765	Upload Photo	Q26549969
54, St Ann Street	II*	54, St Ann Street			SU1479829664; 51°03′58″N 1°47′25″W		1258869	54, St Ann Street	Q17544152
Joiners Hall	I	56 and 58, St Ann Street	house		SU1480629667; 51°03′58″N 1°47′24″W		1258872	Joiners Hall More images	Q17529779
60-66, St Ann Street	II*	60-66, St Ann Street			SU1482229663; 51°03′58″N 1°47′23″W		1273236	Upload Photo	Q17545865
68, St Ann Street	II	68, St Ann Street			SU1483229672; 51°03′58″N 1°47′23″W		1258887	Upload Photo	Q26550075
70-74, St Ann Street	II	70-74, St Ann Street			SU1484029673; 51°03′58″N 1°47′23″W		1258895	Upload Photo	Q26550079
78 and 80, St Ann Street	II	78 and 80, St Ann Street			SU1485529684; 51°03′59″N 1°47′22″W		1258899	Upload Photo	Q26550083
The Old Surgery and Spire View	II*	84, St Ann Street, SP1 2DX			SU1487229688; 51°03′59″N 1°47′21″W		1273228	Upload Photo	Q17545859
Old Porch in Garden of No 44	II	St Ann Street			SU1477729606; 51°03′56″N 1°47′26″W		1258858	Upload Photo	Q26550051
The Blackmore Museum to the Rear of the Salsbury Museum	II	St Annes Street			SU1473829586; 51°03′56″N 1°47′28″W		1272832	Upload Photo	Q26562639
2-6, St Edmund's Church Street	II	2-6, St Edmund's Church Street			SU1469930062; 51°04′11″N 1°47′30″W		1258926	Upload Photo	Q26550105
8 and 10, St Edmund's Church Street	II	8 and 10, St Edmund's Church Street			SU1469830073; 51°04′11″N 1°47′30″W		1258928	Upload Photo	Q26550107
16-22, St Edmund's Church Street	II	16-22, St Edmund's Church Street			SU1469630090; 51°04′12″N 1°47′30″W		1273206	Upload Photo	Q26562974
24, St Edmund's Church Street	II*	24, St Edmund's Church Street			SU1469230112; 51°04′13″N 1°47′30″W		1273211	24, St Edmund's Church Street	Q17545853
58 and 60, St Edmund's Church Street	II	58 and 60, St Edmund's Church Street			SU1466830208; 51°04′16″N 1°47′31″W		1258953	Upload Photo	Q26550130
65, St Edmund's Church Street	II	65, St Edmund's Church Street, SP1 1EF			SU1466030166; 51°04′14″N 1°47′32″W		1258956	Upload Photo	Q26550133
93-95, St Edmund's Church Street	II	93-95, St Edmund's Church Street, SP1 1EQ			SU1464530248; 51°04′17″N 1°47′32″W		1273183	Upload Photo	Q26562956
Methodist Community Church	II	St Edmund's Church Street	church building		SU1469630131; 51°04′13″N 1°47′30″W		1258943	Methodist Community Church More images	Q26550121
White Hart Hotel	II*	1, St John's Street	hotel		SU1457129722; 51°04′00″N 1°47′36″W		1258980	White Hart Hotel More images	Q17544158
The Cloisters	II*	3 and 5, St John's Street			SU1457429685; 51°03′59″N 1°47′36″W		1273188	Upload Photo	Q17545841
7 and 7a, St John's Street	II*	7 and 7a, St John's Street			SU1457629678; 51°03′59″N 1°47′36″W		1273190	7 and 7a, St John's Street	Q17545847
The Chapter House	I	9, St Johns Street, SP1 2SB	pub		SU1457829661; 51°03′58″N 1°47′36″W		1273159	The Chapter House More images	Q17529855
Part of the Chapter House	II*	11, St Johns Street, SP1 2SB			SU1457329657; 51°03′58″N 1°47′36″W		1259028	Part of the Chapter House More images	Q17544159
13, St Johns Street	II	13, St Johns Street			SU1457429649; 51°03′58″N 1°47′36″W		1259034	13, St Johns Street More images	Q26550197
2 and 4, St Thomas's Square	II	2 and 4, St Thomas's Square			SU1431730022; 51°04′10″N 1°47′49″W		1259099	Upload Photo	Q26550251
8, St Thomas's Square	II	8, St Thomas's Square			SU1429829991; 51°04′09″N 1°47′50″W		1243065	Upload Photo	Q26535776
Church of St Thomas	I	St Thomas's Square	church building		SU1433229985; 51°04′08″N 1°47′49″W		1273123	Church of St Thomas More images	Q17529846
Salisbury Generating Station	II	St Thomas's Square	watermill		SU1428229960; 51°04′08″N 1°47′51″W		1243066	Salisbury Generating Station More images	Q26535777
Craddock House Friars Cottage Friary Cottage Friary Court	II*	The Friary			SU1464729590; 51°03′56″N 1°47′32″W		1355799	Upload Photo	Q17546339
Trinity Almshouses Trinity Hospital	I	1-13, Trinity Street	almshouse		SU1468029765; 51°04′01″N 1°47′31″W		1243305	Trinity Almshouses Trinity Hospital More images	Q17529717
13-17, Trinity Street	II	13-17, Trinity Street			SU1466929752; 51°04′01″N 1°47′31″W		1243304	Upload Photo	Q26535988
14-20, Trinity Street	II	14-20, Trinity Street			SU1466329736; 51°04′00″N 1°47′32″W		1243264	Upload Photo	Q26535948
22 and 24, Trinity Street	II	22 and 24, Trinity Street			SU1467429733; 51°04′00″N 1°47′31″W		1243265	Upload Photo	Q26535949
26-40, Trinity Street	II	26-40, Trinity Street			SU1469529731; 51°04′00″N 1°47′30″W		1243288	Upload Photo	Q26535972
42-46, Trinity Street	II	42-46, Trinity Street			SU1471229730; 51°04′00″N 1°47′29″W		1243303	Upload Photo	Q26535987
Terrace Wall, Rails, Steps and Gate Piers of Blechyndens Almshouses	II	Winchester Street			SU1477130038; 51°04′10″N 1°47′26″W		1272886	Upload Photo	Q26562688
1, Winchester Street	II	1, Winchester Street			SU1451730074; 51°04′11″N 1°47′39″W		1023647	1, Winchester Street More images	Q26274606
Blechyndens Almshouses	II	1-6, Winchester Street			SU1478530047; 51°04′10″N 1°47′25″W		1243412	Upload Photo	Q26536091
3 5 and 5b, Winchester Street	II	3 5 and 5b, Winchester Street			SU1452830070; 51°04′11″N 1°47′39″W		1272915	Upload Photo	Q26562716
17, Winchester Street	II	17, Winchester Street			SU1457930065; 51°04′11″N 1°47′36″W		1243376	Upload Photo	Q26536057
18-22, Winchester Street	II	18-22, Winchester Street			SU1460930048; 51°04′10″N 1°47′34″W		1243344	Upload Photo	Q26536027
19 and 21, Winchester Street	II*	19 and 21, Winchester Street	building		SU1458430068; 51°04′11″N 1°47′36″W		1243384	19 and 21, Winchester Street More images	Q17543833
24, Winchester Street	II	24, Winchester Street			SU1463430040; 51°04′10″N 1°47′33″W		1243347	Upload Photo	Q26536030
26 and 30, Winchester Street	II	26 and 30, Winchester Street			SU1463730034; 51°04′10″N 1°47′33″W		1243348	Upload Photo	Q26536031
31-35, Winchester Street	II	31-35, Winchester Street			SU1462830066; 51°04′11″N 1°47′33″W		1243385	Upload Photo	Q26536065
32-44, Winchester Street	II	32-44, Winchester Street			SU1466530040; 51°04′10″N 1°47′31″W		1272925	Upload Photo	Q26562725
37, Winchester Street	II	37, Winchester Street			SU1463230065; 51°04′11″N 1°47′33″W		1272894	Upload Photo	Q26562696
47, Winchester Street	II*	47, Winchester Street			SU1468330060; 51°04′11″N 1°47′31″W		1243388	47, Winchester Street	Q17543836
51-55, Winchester Street	II	51-55, Winchester Street			SU1469830057; 51°04′11″N 1°47′30″W		1243389	Upload Photo	Q26536068
56-60, Winchester Street	II	56-60, Winchester Street			SU1471130030; 51°04′10″N 1°47′29″W		1243358	Upload Photo	Q26536040
57, Winchester Street	II	57, Winchester Street			SU1471230056; 51°04′11″N 1°47′29″W		1243404	Upload Photo	Q26536083
62 and 64, Winchester Street	II	62 and 64, Winchester Street			SU1472330025; 51°04′10″N 1°47′28″W		1243366	Upload Photo	Q26536047
66-76, Winchester Street	II	66-76, Winchester Street			SU1473730027; 51°04′10″N 1°47′28″W		1272913	Upload Photo	Q26562714
77-85, Winchester Street	II	77-85, Winchester Street			SU1479130041; 51°04′10″N 1°47′25″W		1272887	Upload Photo	Q26562689
Anchor and Hope Public House	II	Winchester Street	pub		SU1471730057; 51°04′11″N 1°47′29″W		1243410	Anchor and Hope Public House More images	Q26536089
Coach and Horses Public House	II	Winchester Street	pub		SU1463630076; 51°04′11″N 1°47′33″W		1243386	Coach and Horses Public House More images	Q26536066

== See also ==
- Grade I listed buildings in Wiltshire
- Grade II* listed buildings in Wiltshire

== Sources ==
- Orbach, Julian; Pevsner, Nikolaus; Cherry, Bridget (2021), Wiltshire, The Buildings of England, New Haven and London: Yale University Press, ISBN 978-0-300-25120-3
