= Bath, Somerset =

City in Somerset, England

Coordinates: 51°22′53″N 2°21′35″W

Bath
- City
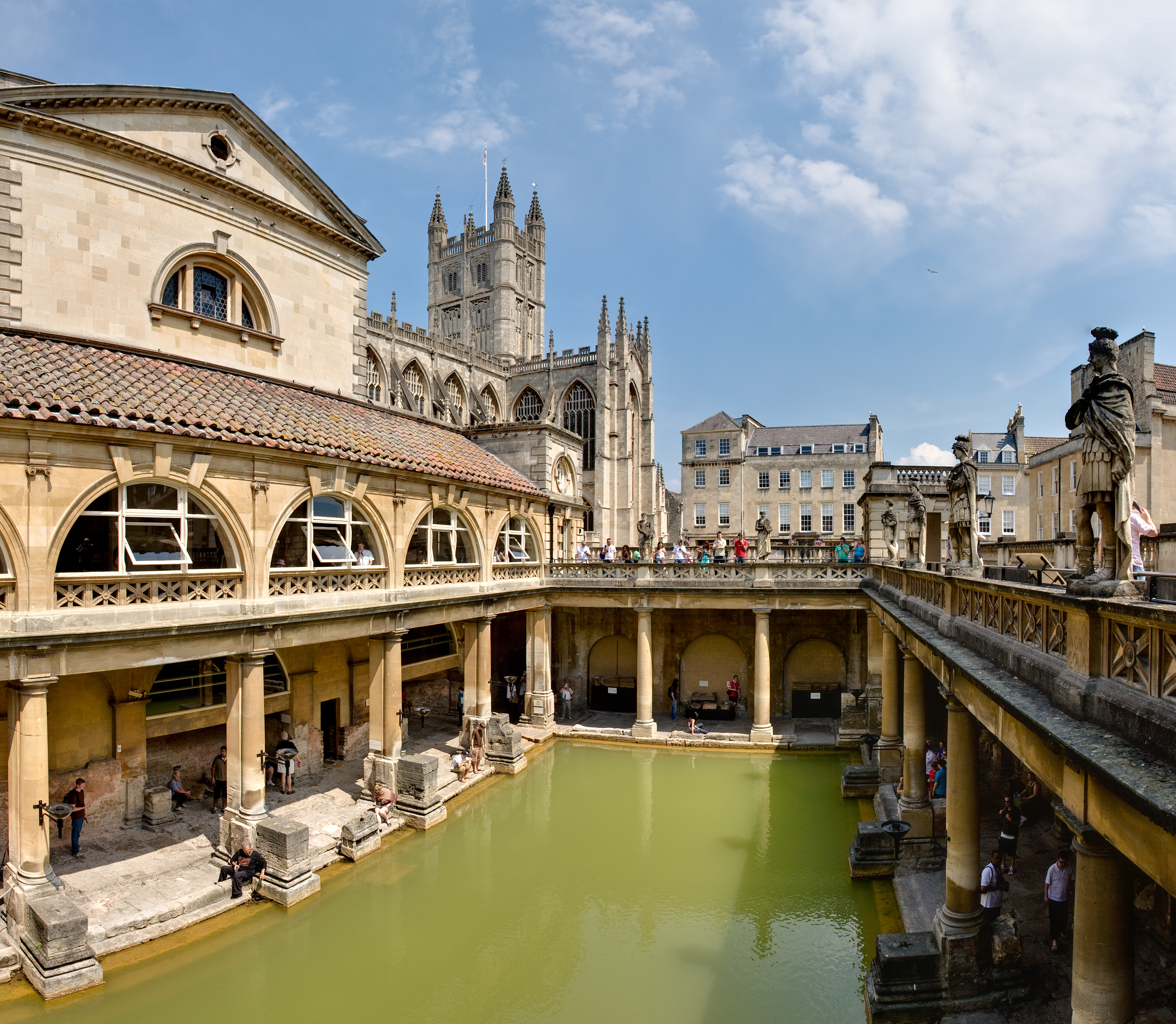
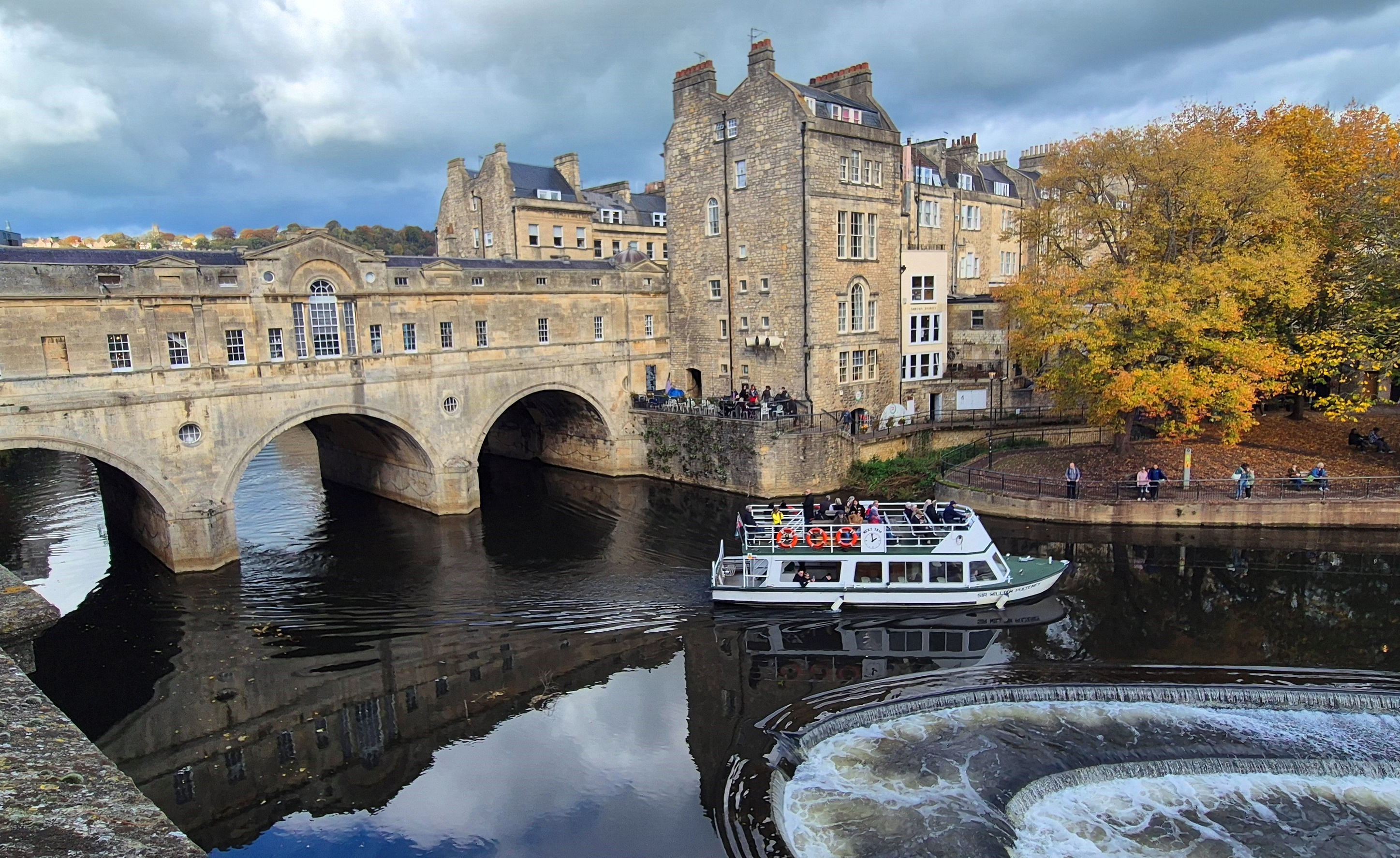
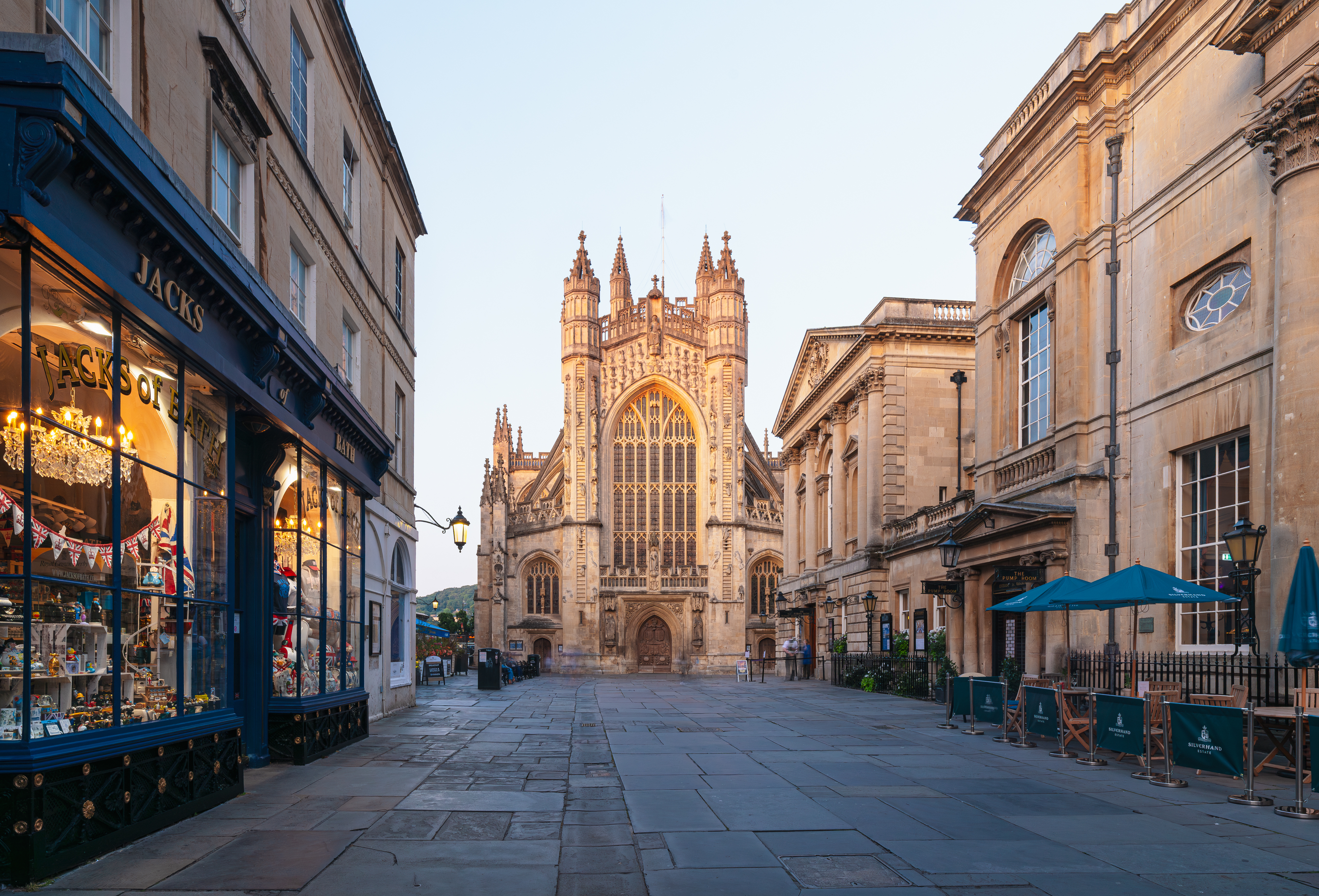
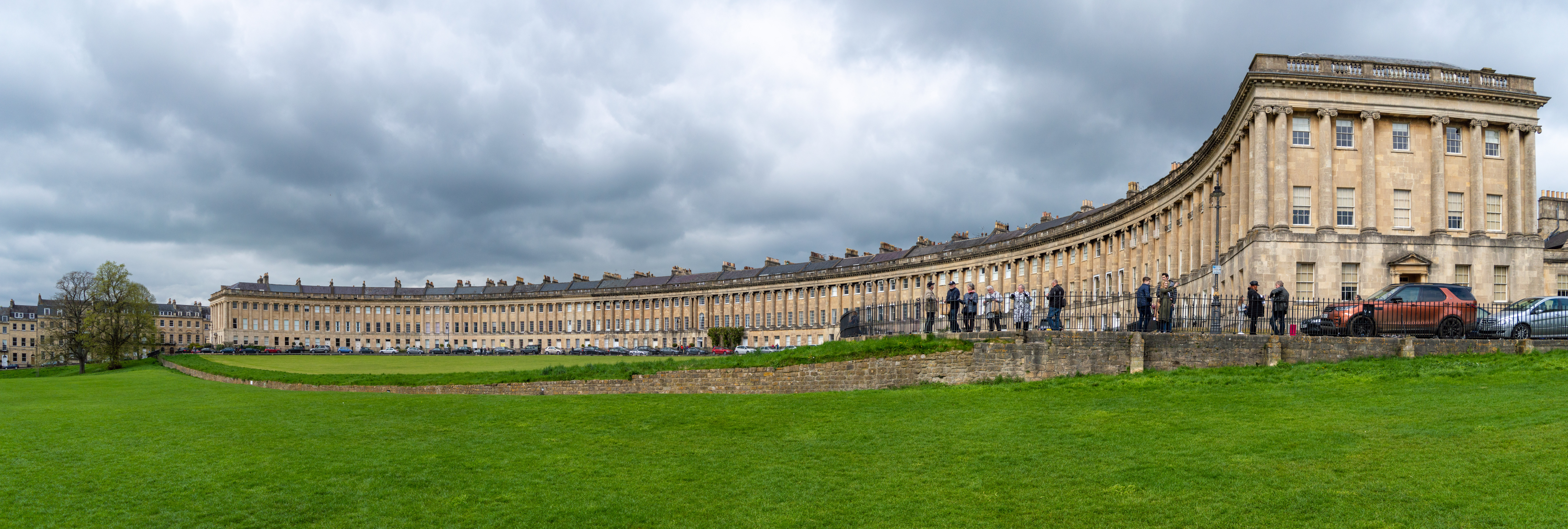
- Roman Baths Pulteney Bridge Bath Abbey Royal Crescent

- Location within Somerset
- Population: 94,080 (2021 Census)
- Demonym: Bathonian
- OS grid reference: ST750645
  - London: 97 mi (156 km) E
- Unitary authority: Bath and North East Somerset
- Ceremonial county: Somerset
- Region: South West
- Country: England
- Sovereign state: United Kingdom
- Post town: Bath
- Postcode district: BA1, BA2
- Dialling code: 01225
- Police: Avon and Somerset
- Fire: Avon
- Ambulance: South Western
- UK Parliament: Bath

UNESCO World Heritage Site
- Official name: City of Bath
- Criteria: Cultural: i, ii, iv
- Reference: 428
- Inscription: 1987 (11th Session)
- Area: 2,900 ha (7,200 acres)

UNESCO World Heritage Site
- Part of: Great Spa Towns of Europe
- Criteria: Cultural: ii, iii
- Reference: 1613
- Inscription: 2021 (44th Session)
- Website: bathnes.gov.uk

Bath (RP: /bɑːθ/, locally [ba(ː)θ]) is a city in Somerset, England, known for and named after its Roman-built baths. The city became a UNESCO World Heritage Site in 1987, and was later listed as one of the "Great Spa Towns of Europe". Bath is situated in the valley of the River Avon, 97 miles (156 km) west of London and 11 miles (18 km) southeast of Bristol, and is the largest city and urban settlement in Somerset. At the 2021 census, the population of the city was 94,080.

The city became a spa with the Latin name Aquae Sulis ("the waters of Sulis") c. 60 AD when the Romans built baths and a temple in the Avon valley, although hot springs were known even before then. Bath Abbey was founded in the 7th century and became a religious centre; the building was rebuilt in the 12th and 16th centuries. In the 17th century, the spring water was claimed to have curative properties, and Bath became a popular spa town in the Georgian era. Georgian architecture, crafted from Bath stone, includes the Royal Crescent, Circus, Grand Pump Room, and the Assembly Rooms, where Beau Nash presided over the city's social life from 1705 until his death in 1761. Many of the streets and squares were laid out by John Wood, the Elder, and in the 18th century the city became fashionable and the population grew. Further building was undertaken in the 19th century and following the Bath Blitz in World War II.

Bath has over six million yearly visitors, which made it the ninth most-visited English city in 2019. Attractions include the spas, canal boat tours, Royal Crescent, Bath Skyline, Parade Gardens, Sydney Gardens and the Royal Victoria Park. Shopping areas include the SouthGate shopping centre, the Corridor arcade among various artisan shops. Bath is also home to theatres including the Theatre Royal, as well as several museums including the Museum of Bath Architecture, the Victoria Art Gallery, the Museum of East Asian Art, the Herschel Museum of Astronomy, the Fashion Museum, and the Holburne Museum. The city has two universities, the University of Bath and Bath Spa University, with Bath College providing further education. Sporting clubs from the city include Bath Rugby and Bath City F.C.

== Toponymy ==
The Roman name for the settlement that is now the city of Bath was Aquae Sulis, meaning "the waters of Sulis" in Latin. Sulis was a Celtic deity to which the Britons had dedicated the natural hot spring in the area. The Romans made the city a spa town in c. 60 AD, as part of which they built the Roman Baths, from which the modern name of the city is derived. After the Anglo-Saxon settlement of Britain, the settlement was given the name of Hat Bathu, meaning "hot waters", though after the spring rather than the Roman baths.

Victorian churchman Edward Churton wrote that during the Anglo-Saxon era, Bath was known as Acemannesceastre ('Akemanchester'), or 'aching men's city', because the natural spring was seen as being able to heal the sick. During the reign of Edward the Elder, coins were minted in Bath with 'BAD' on the obverse, suggesting that the Anglo-Saxon name for the town at the time was Baðum, Baðan, or Baðon, meaning "at the baths". An inhabitant of Bath is known as a Bathonian (/bəˈθəʊ.ni.ən/).

== History ==
=== Pre-Roman and Roman ===
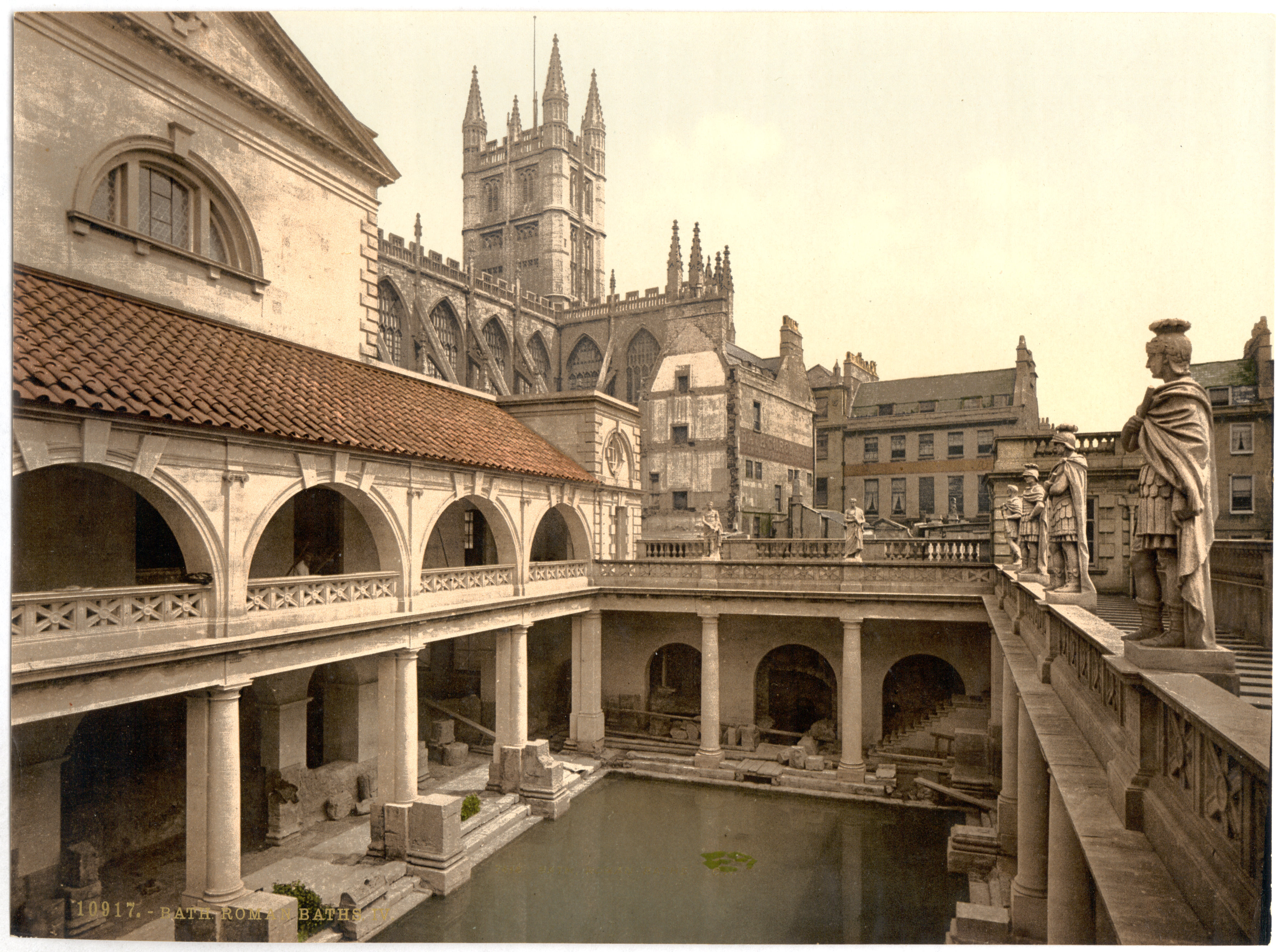
19th-century photochrom of the Great Bath at the Roman Baths. The entire structure above the level of the pillar bases is a later construction and was not a feature of the building in Roman days.

The hills in the locality such as Bathampton Down saw human activity from the Mesolithic period. Several Bronze Age round barrows were opened by John Skinner in the 18th century. A long barrow site, believed to be from the Beaker people of the Early Bronze Age, was flattened to make way for RAF Charmy Down. Solsbury Hill, which overlooks the current city, was an Iron Age hill fort, as well as possibly the adjacent Bathampton Camp.

Archaeological evidence shows that the site of the main spring for the Roman Baths may have been treated as a shrine by the Britons, and was dedicated to the water deity Sulis, equivalent to the Roman goddess Minerva; the name Sulis continued to be used after the Roman invasion, appearing in the town's Roman name, Aquae Sulis (literally, "the waters of Sulis"). Messages to her scratched onto metal, known as curse tablets, have been recovered from the sacred spring by archaeologists. The tablets were written in Latin, and laid curses on personal enemies.

A temple was constructed in 60–70 AD, and a bathing complex was built up over the next 300 years. Engineers drove oak piles into the mud to provide a stable foundation, and surrounded the spring with an irregular stone chamber lined with lead. In the second century, the spring was enclosed within a wooden barrel-vaulted structure that housed the caldarium (hot bath), tepidarium (warm bath), and frigidarium (cold bath). The town was later given defensive walls, probably in the third century. After the end of Roman rule in Britain, the baths fell into disrepair and were eventually lost as a result of rising water levels and silting. In March 2012, archaeologists unearthed a hoard of 30,000 silver Roman coins about 150 metres (490 ft) from the Roman Baths. The hoard is believed to date from the third century is one of the largest discovered in Britain.

=== Anglo-Saxon and medieval ===
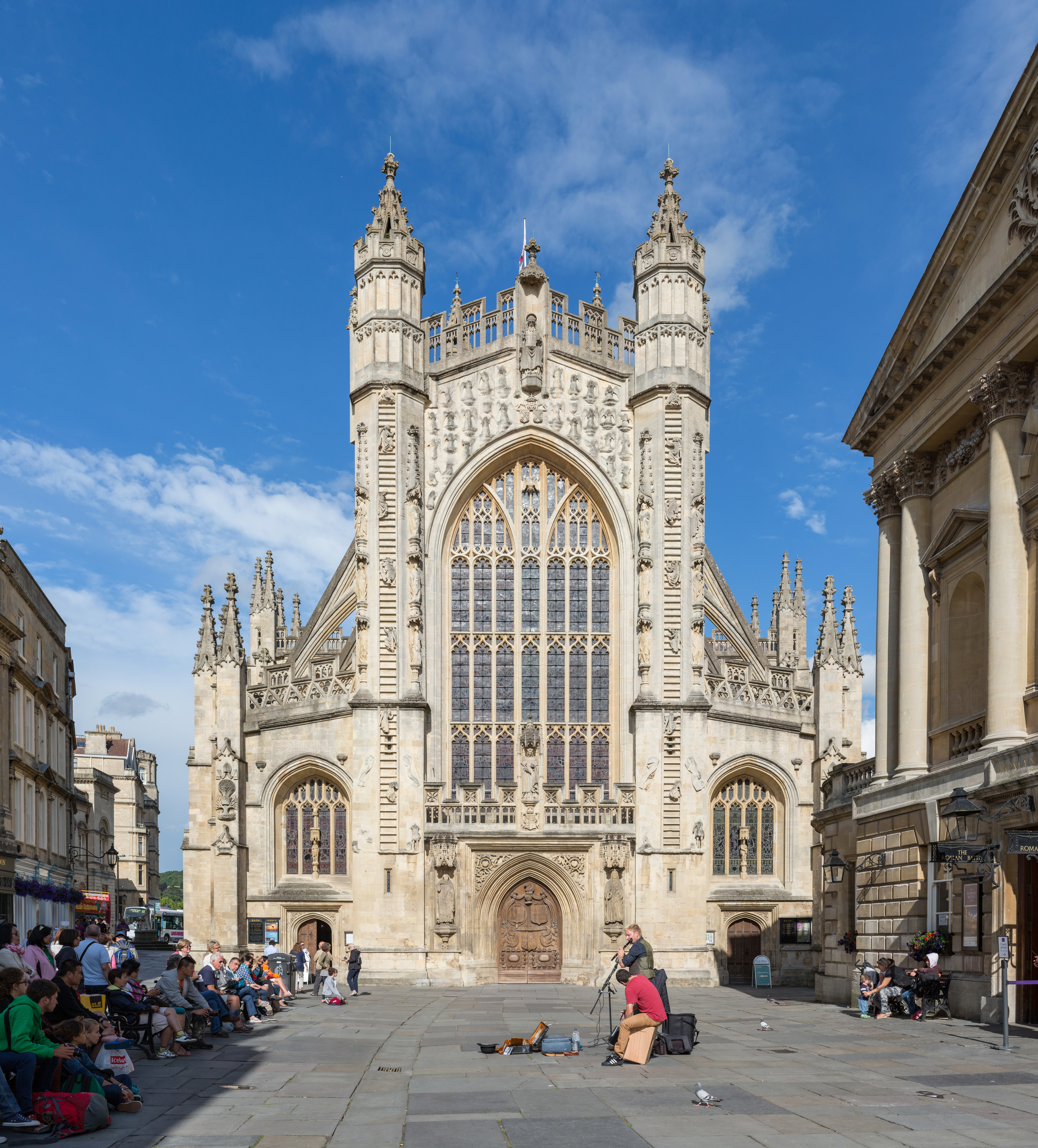
Bath Abbey

It was suggested by Geoffrey of Monmouth that a hillfort on the outskirts of Bath was the site of the 6th century Battle of Badon, in which King Arthur defeated the Anglo-Saxons, though that is not accepted by the majority of modern historians. The town was captured by the West Saxons in 577 after the Battle of Deorham; the Anglo-Saxon poem The Ruin may describe the appearance of the Roman site about this time. A monastery was founded at an early date, reputedly by Saint David although more probably in 675 by Osric, King of the Hwicce, perhaps using the walled area as its precinct. Other sources refer to the order founded by Osric as a nunnery, with a date of 676.

Nennius, a 9th-century historian, mentions a "hot lake" in the land of the Hwicce along the River Severn, and adds that "it is surrounded by a wall, made of brick and stone, and men may go there to bathe at any time, and every man can have the kind of bath he likes. If he wants, it will be a cold bath; and if he wants a hot bath, it will be hot". Bede described hot baths in the geographical introduction to the Ecclesiastical History in terms very similar to those of Nennius. King Offa of Mercia gained control of the monastery in 781 and rebuilt the church, which was dedicated to Saint Peter. By the 9th century, the old Roman street pattern had been lost and Bath was a royal possession. King Alfred laid out the town afresh, leaving its south-eastern quadrant as the abbey precinct. In the Burghal Hidage, Bath is recorded as a burh (borough), described as having walls of 1,375 yards (1,257 m), allocated 1000 men for defence. King Edgar of England was crowned in Bath Abbey in 973, in a ceremony that formed the basis of all future English coronations.

William Rufus granted the town, abbey and mint to a royal physician, John of Tours, who, following the sacking of the town during the Rebellion of 1088, became Bishop of Wells and Abbot of Bath. It was papal policy for bishops to move to more urban seats, and John of Tours translated his own from Wells to Bath. The bishop planned and began a much larger church as his cathedral, to which was attached a priory, with the bishop's palace beside it. New baths were built around the three springs. Later bishops returned the episcopal seat to Wells while retaining the name Bath in the title, thus becoming the Bishop of Bath and Wells. St John's Hospital was founded around 1180 by Bishop Reginald Fitz Jocelin and is among the oldest almshouses in England. The 'hospital of the baths' was built beside the hot springs of the Cross Bath, for their health-giving properties and to provide shelter for the poor infirm. Administrative systems fell within the hundreds. The Bath Hundred had various names including the Hundred of Le Buri. The Bath Foreign Hundred or Forinsecum covered the area outside the city and was later combined into the Bath Forum Hundred. Wealthy merchants had no status within the hundred courts and formed guilds to gain influence. Around 1200, the first mayor was appointed, and the first guildhall was probably built in the same century

=== Early modern period ===
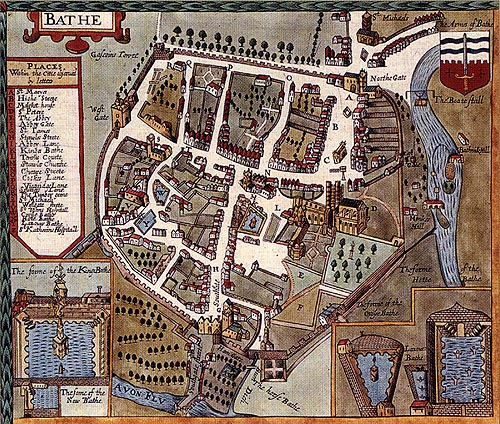
Map of Bath by John Speed published in 1610

By the 15th century, Bath's abbey church was dilapidated, and Oliver King, Bishop of Bath and Wells, decided to rebuild it on a smaller scale in 1500. The new church was completed just a few years before Bath Priory was dissolved in 1539 by Henry VIII. The abbey church became derelict before being restored as the city's parish church in the Elizabethan era, when the city experienced a revival as a spa. The baths were improved and the city began to attract the aristocracy. A royal charter granted by Queen Elizabeth I in 1590 confirmed city status. James Montagu, Bishop of Bath and Wells from 1608, spent considerable sums in restoring Bath Abbey and actively supported the Baths themselves, aware that the "towne liveth wholly by them". In 1613, perhaps at his behest, Queen Anne visited the town to take the waters: the Queen's Bath was named after her. The cue for the visit may have been the completion of the restoration work to Bath Abbey, the last instalment of which had been paid for two years previously. Anne of Denmark also visited Bath in 1613 and 1615.

By the beginning of the English Civil War, the city was a first-class resort. However, it lost much of this trade in 1642 upon the outbreak of war, when fiddlers, "ladies who are there", and ale-house guides lost their customers. The city was initially garrisoned for Charles I, and £7000 (equivalent to £1,430,000 in 2025) was spent on fortifications, but upon the appearance of parliamentary forces the gates were thrown open and the city surrendered. It became a significant post for the Western Association army under William Waller. Bath was retaken by the royalists in July 1643 following the Battle of Lansdowne and occupied for two years until 1645. The city was spared events such as widespread destruction of property, overcrowding, bubonic plague, or mass starvation, unlike the nearby cities of Bristol and Gloucester, and safe water was piped in from the surrounding hills. Nevertheless, soldiers who were billeted in private houses contributed to disorder and vandalism, though this never caused the general destruction and plundering seen in Marlborough and other towns. Bath remained a health resort, often for wounded soldiers, its markets continued open and well-regulated, and its shopkeepers and craftsmen continued busy. Nevertheless, council spending, rents and grants all decreased and the finances of the Bath City Council were seriously affected.

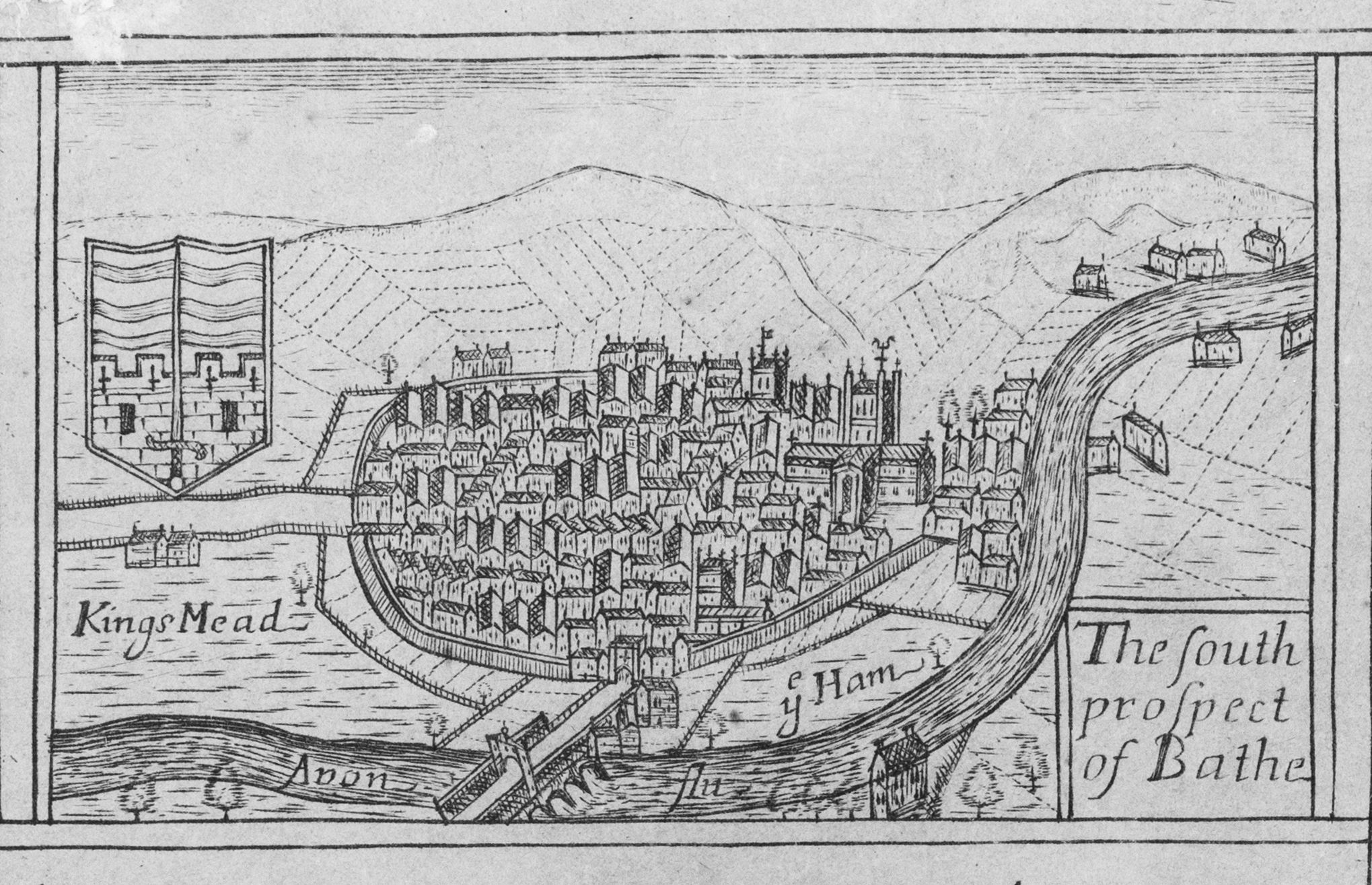
The South Prospect of Bath as depicted in Millerd's 1673 map of Bristol

Normality to the city quickly recovered after the war when the city council achieved a healthy budget surplus. Thomas Guidott, a student of chemistry and medicine at Wadham College, Oxford, set up a practice in the city in 1668. He was interested in the curative properties of the waters, and he wrote A discourse of Bathe, and the hot waters there. Also, Some Enquiries into the Nature of the water in 1676. It brought the health-giving properties of the hot mineral waters to the attention of the country, and the aristocracy arrived to partake in them.

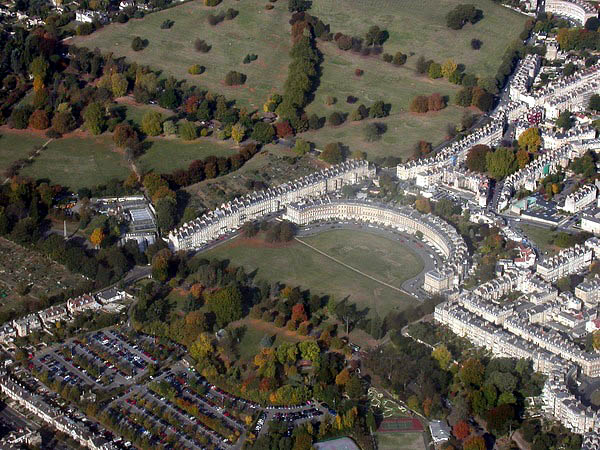
The Royal Crescent and Circus from the air

Several areas of the city were developed in the Stuart period, and more building took place during Georgian times in response to the increasing number of visitors who required accommodation. Architects John Wood the Elder and his son laid out the new quarters in streets and squares, the identical façades of which gave an impression of palatial scale and classical decorum. Much of the creamy gold Bath stone, a type of limestone used for construction in the city, was obtained from the Combe Down and Bathampton Down Mines owned by Ralph Allen. Allen, to advertise the quality of his quarried limestone, commissioned the elder John Wood to build a country house on his Prior Park estate between the city and the mines. Allen was also a member of the Bath Corporation for many years, and was elected mayor for a single term in 1742.

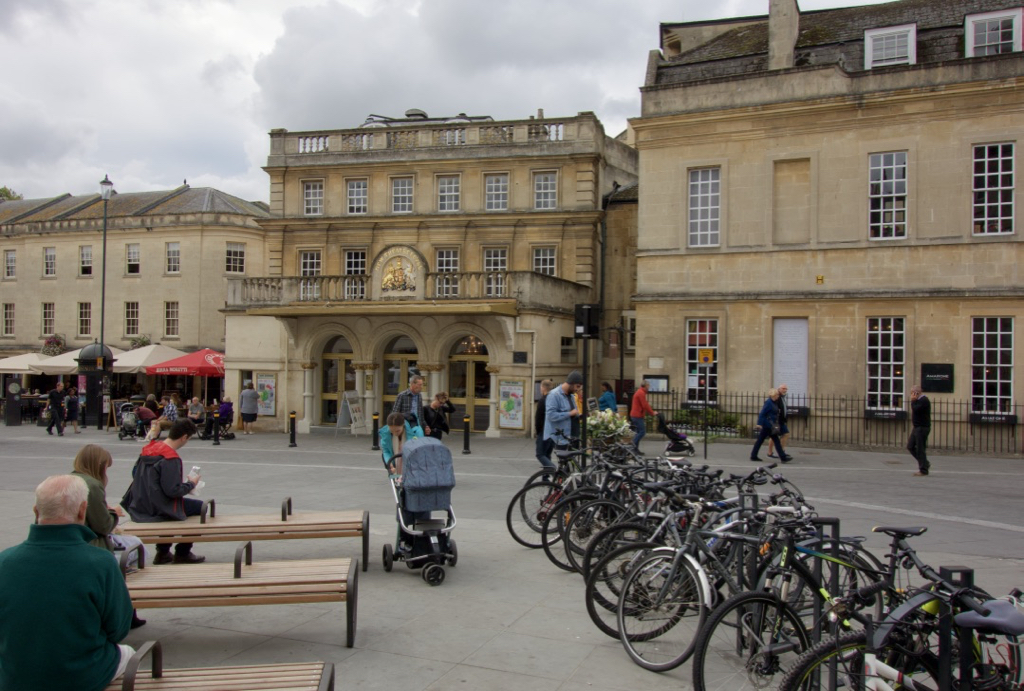
The Theatre Royal

In the early 18th century, Bath acquired its first purpose-built theatre, the Old Orchard Street Theatre. It was rebuilt as the Theatre Royal, along with the Grand Pump Room attached to the Roman Baths and assembly rooms. Master of ceremonies Beau Nash, who presided over the city's social life from 1704 until his death in 1761, drew up a code of behaviour for public entertainments. Bath was, at this time, one of the most fashionable British spa towns, and it attracted many notable visitors. In 1816, it was described as "a seat of amusement and dissipation", where "scenes of extravagance in this receptacle of the wealthy and the idle, the weak and designing" were habitual.

=== Modern period ===
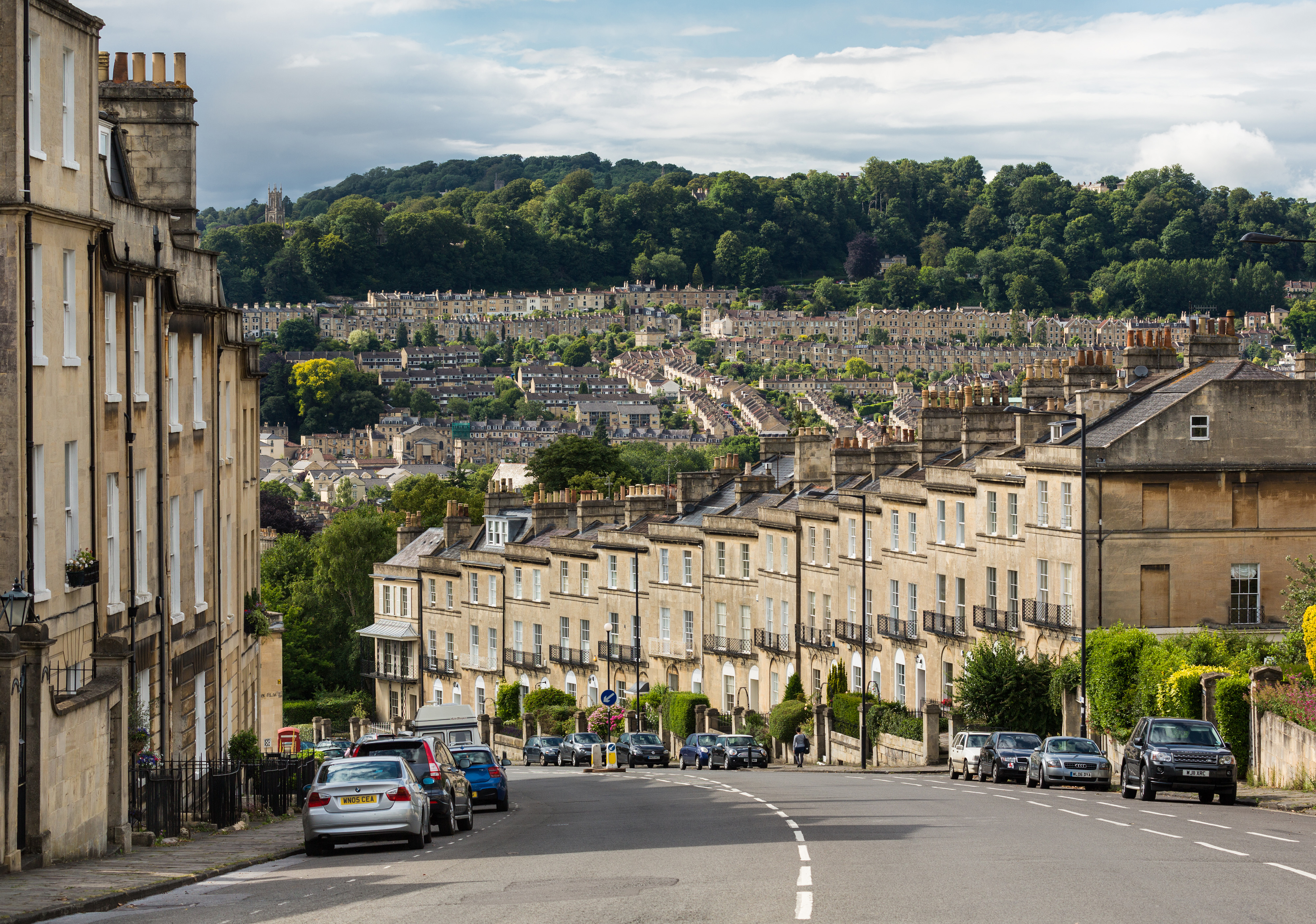
Looking north-west from Bathwick Hill towards the northern suburbs, showing the variety of housing typical of Bath

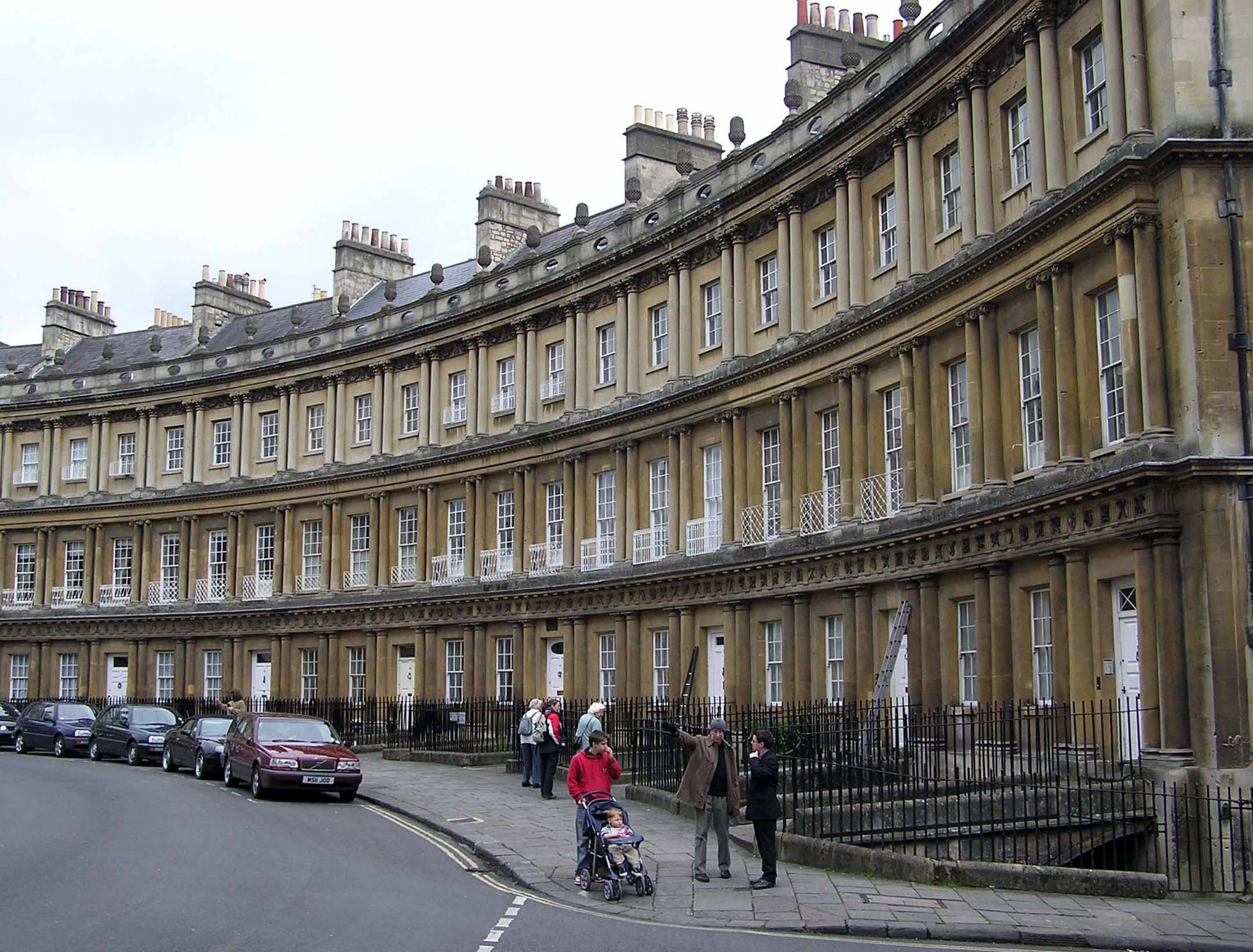
The Circus

The population of the city grew rapidly, from 2,000 in 1700, to 28,000 in 1801, to 57,000 in 1831. This made it one of the largest cities in Britain by the early 1800s. William Thomas Beckford had bought a house in Lansdown Crescent in 1822, and subsequently two adjacent houses to form his residence. Having acquired all the land between his home and the top of Lansdown Hill, he created a garden more than 1/2 mile (800 m) in length with the eponymous Beckford's Tower at the top.

Emperor Haile Selassie of Ethiopia spent four years in exile, from 1936 to 1940, at Fairfield House in Bath. During World War II, between the evening of 25 April and the early morning of 27 April 1942, Bath suffered three air raids in reprisal for RAF raids on the German cities of Lübeck and Rostock, part of the Luftwaffe campaign popularly known as the Baedeker Blitz. During the Bath Blitz, more than 400 people were killed, and more than 19,000 buildings damaged or destroyed. Houses in Royal Crescent, Circus and Paragon were burnt out along with the Assembly Rooms. A 500-kilogram (1,100 lb) high explosive bomb landed on the east side of Queen Square, resulting in houses on the south side being damaged and the Francis Hotel losing 24 metres (79 ft) of its frontage. The buildings have all been restored but signs of the bombing remain.

A post-war review of inadequate housing led to the clearance and redevelopment of areas of the city in a postwar style, often at variance with the local Georgian style. In the 1950s, the nearby villages of Combe Down, Twerton and Weston were incorporated into the city to enable the development of housing, much of it council housing. In 1965, town planner Colin Buchanan published Bath: A Planning and Transport Study, which to a large degree sought to better accommodate the motor car, including the idea of a traffic tunnel underneath the centre of Bath. Adam Fergusson points out in his book The Sack of Bath that the maps given to Buchanan were inadequate and did not show all listed buildings, jeapordising the utility of the report, which the council seemed to simultaneously support and undermine. In the 1970s and 1980s, it was recognised that conservation of historic buildings was inadequate, leading to more care and reuse of buildings and open spaces. In 1987, the city was selected by UNESCO as a World Heritage Site, recognising its international cultural significance.

Between 1991 and 2000, Bath was the scene of a series of rapes committed by an unidentified man dubbed the "Batman rapist". The attacker remains at large and is the subject of Britain's longest-running serial rape investigation. He is said to have a tights fetish, have a scar below his bottom lip and resides in the Bath area or otherwise knows it very well. He has also been linked to the unsolved murder of Melanie Hall, which occurred in the city in 1996. Although the offender's DNA is known and several thousand men in Bath were DNA tested, the attacker continues to evade police.

Since 2000, major developments have included the Thermae Bath Spa, the SouthGate shopping centre, the residential Western Riverside project on the Stothert & Pitt factory site, and the riverside Bath Quays office and business development. In 2021, Bath become part of a second UNESCO World Heritage Site, a group of spa towns across Europe known as the "Great Spas of Europe". This makes it one of the only places to be formally recognised twice as a World Heritage site.

== Governance ==
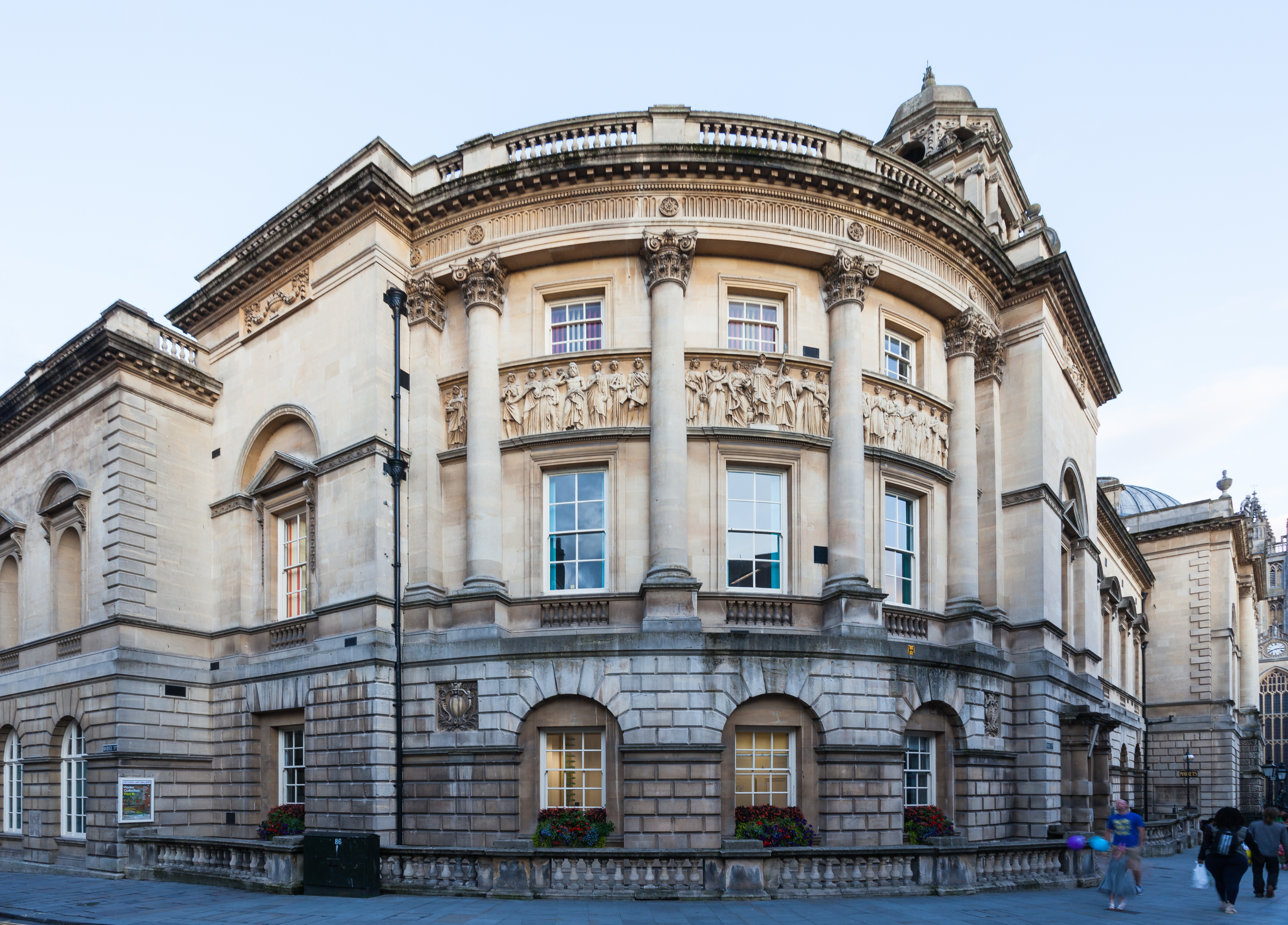
The Guildhall, where Bath and North East Somerset Council meets

There is one main tier of local government covering Bath, at unitary authority level: Bath and North East Somerset Council, which also covers extensive surrounding areas. The council is a member of the West of England Combined Authority, which is led by the directly elected Mayor of the West of England. The council meets at Bath Guildhall on the High Street, the oldest part of which was completed in 1778. The council also has offices at 3-4 Manvers Street in Bath, as well as offices outside Bath at Keynsham and Midsomer Norton.

For national elections, the city forms part of the Bath constituency, which also includes adjoining rural areas and villages to the north of the city.

=== Administrative history ===
Bath was an ancient borough which formed part of the Bath Forum hundred of Somerset. The borough developed from a burh (fortified settlement) established by Alfred the Great (reigned 871–899) using the old Roman defences. In 1090, Bath Abbey became one of the seats of the Diocese of Bath and Wells, after which the borough also held city status. Bath retained its city status even after the diocese reverted to using Wells Cathedral as its sole seat following the dissolution of Bath Abbey in 1539, when the building was demoted to being a parish church.

The city included several parishes, the number of which fluctuated over time. A government survey of boroughs in 1835 recorded that at that time the city comprised the three parishes of St Peter and St Paul (Bath Abbey), St James, and St Michael, and part of the parish of Walcot. The same survey found that the date Bath had been made a borough was unknown, and that the city's oldest known municipal charter dated from the first year of the reign of Richard I.

The city was a parliamentary borough (constituency) from 1295, returning two members of parliament.

In 1832, the constituency was enlarged to take in the neighbouring parishes of Bathwick, Lyncombe, Widcombe, and the remainder of Walcot parish (with the exception of a detached rural exclave of Walcot parish which lay north of Charlcombe). In 1836, the borough was reformed to become a municipal borough under the Municipal Corporations Act 1835, which standardised how most boroughs operated across the country. As part of the 1836 reforms, the borough boundaries were enlarged to match the constituency.

When elected county councils were established in 1889, Bath was considered large enough for its existing council to provide county-level functions. Bath was therefore made a county borough, administratively independent from Somerset County Council, whilst remaining part of the geographical county of Somerset. The civil parishes within the city were merged into a single parish of Bath, matching the city, in 1900. The city boundaries were enlarged in 1911, 1951 and 1967 to take in the growing suburbs.

The county borough of Bath was abolished in 1974 under the Local Government Act 1972. A non-metropolitan district called Bath was created in its place, with the same boundaries as the old county borough. The district inherited Bath's borough status (allowing the chair of the council to take the title of mayor) and its city status. As part of the 1974 reforms, the city was transferred to the new county of Avon, and the city council as reconstituted in 1974 was a lower-tier district council subordinate to Avon County Council.

The county of Avon and the district of Bath were abolished in 1996. A new district called Bath and North East Somerset was then created covering the combined area of the abolished Bath and Wansdyke districts. The district council also performs county council functions, making it a unitary authority. For ceremonial purposes, the district was restored to Somerset at the same time.

Since 1996, Bath has therefore not had a council just for the city. To preserve Bath's city status and to oversee its civic traditions and twinning arrangements, the Bath and North East Somerset councillors who represent the fifteen wards which cover the city act as charter trustees. They choose one of their number each year to serve as Mayor of Bath, which is now a ceremonial role. The mayor for 2026–2027 is Ruth Malloy, the 799th mayor of the city.

=== Coat of arms ===
The coat of arms includes a depiction of the city wall, and two silver stripes representing the River Avon and the hot springs. The sword of St. Paul is a link to Bath Abbey. The supporters, a lion and a bear, stand on a bed of acorns, a link to Bladud, the subject of the Legend of Bath. The knight's helmet indicates a municipality and the crown is that of King Edgar (referencing his coronation at the Abbey). The Arms bear the motto "Aqvae Svlis", the Roman name for Bath in Latin script.

Coat of arms of Bath, Somerset
Notes Granted 1971. Crest On a Wreath Argent and Azure issuant a dexter and sinister Cubit Arm habited holding aloft a representation of the Crown of King Edgar proper. Escutcheon Per fesse embattled Azure and Gules the base masoned Sable in chief two Bars wavy over all a Sword erect Argent pomel and hilt Or between in base two Crosses bottonee of the third. Supporters On the dexter side a Lion and on the sinister side a Bear each standing upon a Branch of Oak fructed proper and charged on the shoulder with a Sword in bend proper hilt and pomel enfiling two Keys in bend sinister addorsed Or.

== Geography ==
=== Physical geography ===
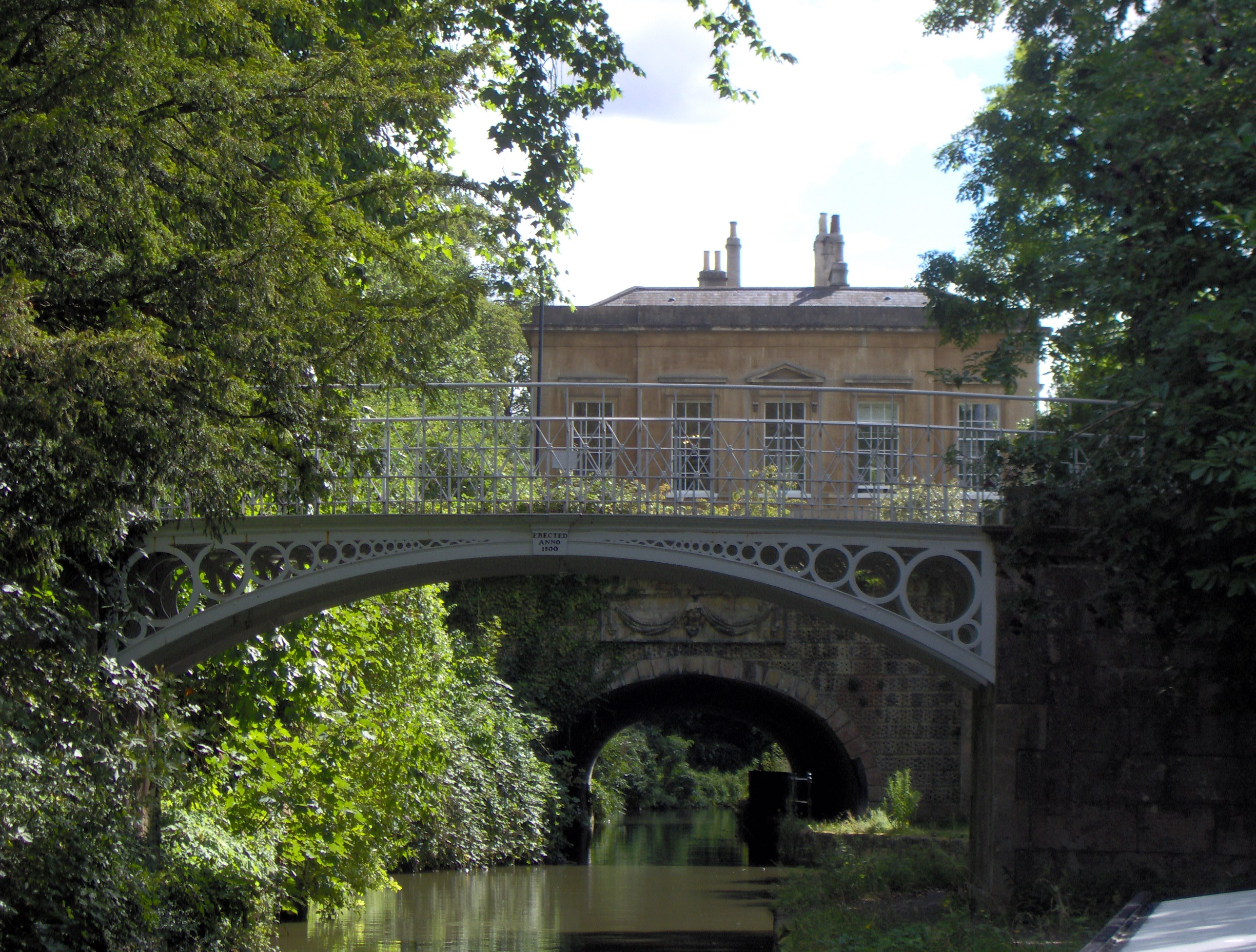
Cleveland House and the cast iron bridges of Sydney Gardens over the Kennet and Avon Canal

Bath is in the Avon Valley and is surrounded by limestone hills as it is near the southern edge of the Cotswolds, a designated Area of Outstanding Natural Beauty, and the Mendip Hills rise around 7 miles (11 km) south of the city. The hills that surround and make up the city have a maximum altitude of 781 feet (238 metres) on the Lansdown plateau. Bath has an area of 11 square miles (28 square kilometres).

The floodplain of the Avon has an altitude of about 59 ft (18 m) above sea level, although the city centre is at an elevation of around 25 metres (82 ft) above sea level. The river, once an unnavigable series of braided streams broken up by swamps and ponds, has been controlled by weirs into a single channel. Periodic flooding, which shortened the life of many buildings in the lowest part of the city, was normal until major flood control works were completed in the 1970s. Kensington Meadows is an area of mixed woodland and open meadow next to the river which has been designated as a local nature reserve.

Water bubbling up from the ground as geothermal springs originates as rain on the Mendip Hills. The rain percolates through limestone aquifers to a depth of 9,000–14,000 ft (2,700–4,300 m) where geothermal energy raises the water's temperature to 64–96 °C. Under pressure, the heated water rises to the surface along fissures and faults in the limestone. Water at a temperature of 46 °C rises at 1,170,000 litres per day (257,364 imp gal/d) daily, originating from the Pennyquick geological fault. In 1983, a new spa-water bore-hole was sunk, providing a clean and safe supply for drinking in the Pump Room. There is no universal definition to distinguish a hot spring from a geothermal spring, although, by several definitions, the Bath springs can be considered the only hot springs in the UK. Three of the springs feed the thermal baths.

=== Climate ===
Along with the rest of South West England, Bath has a temperate climate which is generally wetter and milder than the rest of the country. The annual mean temperature is approximately 11 °C (51.8 °F). Seasonal temperature variation is less extreme than most of the United Kingdom because of the adjacent sea temperatures. The summer months of July and August are the warmest, with mean daily maxima of approximately 22 °C (71.6 °F). In winter, mean minimum temperatures of 2 or 3 °C (35.6 or 37.4 °F) are common. In the summer, the Azores high pressure affects the south-west of England bringing fair weather; however, convective cloud sometimes forms inland, reducing the number of hours of sunshine. Annual sunshine rates are slightly less than the regional average of 1,600 hours.

Most of the rainfall in the south-west is caused by Atlantic depressions or by convection. In summer, a large proportion of the rainfall is caused by sun heating the ground, leading to convection and to showers and thunderstorms. Average rainfall is around 830 mm (33 in). About 8–15 days of snowfall is typical. November to March have the highest mean wind speeds, and June to August have the lightest winds. The predominant wind direction is from the southwest.

Climate data for Bath (1991–2020 normals, extremes 1959–2005)
Month	Jan	Feb	Mar	Apr	May	Jun	Jul	Aug	Sep	Oct	Nov	Dec	Year
Record high °C (°F)	14.5 (58.1)	18.4 (65.1)	20.6 (69.1)	25.5 (77.9)	26.7 (80.1)	32.2 (90.0)	33.0 (91.4)	34.2 (93.6)	27.3 (81.1)	25.0 (77.0)	17.2 (63.0)	15.0 (59.0)	34.2 (93.6)
Mean daily maximum °C (°F)	8.0 (46.4)	8.5 (47.3)	10.9 (51.6)	14.0 (57.2)	17.1 (62.8)	20.0 (68.0)	21.8 (71.2)	21.6 (70.9)	19.1 (66.4)	14.9 (58.8)	11.2 (52.2)	8.5 (47.3)	14.7 (58.5)
Daily mean °C (°F)	5.1 (41.2)	5.4 (41.7)	7.2 (45.0)	9.6 (49.3)	12.5 (54.5)	15.3 (59.5)	17.3 (63.1)	17.1 (62.8)	14.8 (58.6)	11.4 (52.5)	8.1 (46.6)	5.5 (41.9)	10.8 (51.4)
Mean daily minimum °C (°F)	2.2 (36.0)	2.2 (36.0)	3.5 (38.3)	5.1 (41.2)	7.8 (46.0)	10.6 (51.1)	12.7 (54.9)	12.6 (54.7)	10.4 (50.7)	7.9 (46.2)	4.9 (40.8)	2.5 (36.5)	6.9 (44.4)
Record low °C (°F)	−14.0 (6.8)	−9.0 (15.8)	−6.8 (19.8)	−5.0 (23.0)	−0.6 (30.9)	1.1 (34.0)	4.4 (39.9)	4.9 (40.8)	−0.1 (31.8)	−3.2 (26.2)	−7.2 (19.0)	−10.0 (14.0)	−14.0 (6.8)
Average precipitation mm (inches)	83.3 (3.28)	57.0 (2.24)	58.0 (2.28)	57.8 (2.28)	58.8 (2.31)	54.6 (2.15)	57.7 (2.27)	73.9 (2.91)	63.0 (2.48)	86.5 (3.41)	88.7 (3.49)	90.7 (3.57)	829.9 (32.67)
Average precipitation days (≥ 1.0 mm)	13.2	10.8	10.2	10.0	10.0	9.5	9.7	10.7	9.5	12.2	13.7	13.6	132.9
Mean monthly sunshine hours	56.2	68.3	128.8	161.3	197.3	192.2	210.1	198.0	146.7	104.1	67.0	51.2	1,582
Source 1: Met Office
Source 2: Starlings Roost Weather

=== Green belt ===
Bath is fully enclosed by green belt as a part of a wider environmental and planning policy first designated in the late 1950s, and this extends into much of the surrounding district and beyond, helping to maintain local green space, prevent further urban sprawl and unplanned expansion towards Bristol and Bradford-on-Avon, as well as protecting smaller villages in between.

Parts of the Cotswolds Area of Outstanding Natural Beauty's southern extent overlaps the green belt north of the city, with other nearby landscape features and facilities within the green belt including the River Avon, Kennet and Avon Canal, Bath Racecourse, Bath Golf Club, Bathampton Down, Bathampton Meadow Nature Reserve, Bristol and Bath Railway Path, the Cotswold Way, Limestone Link route, Pennyquick Park, Little Solsbury Hill, and Primrose Hill.

== Demographics ==
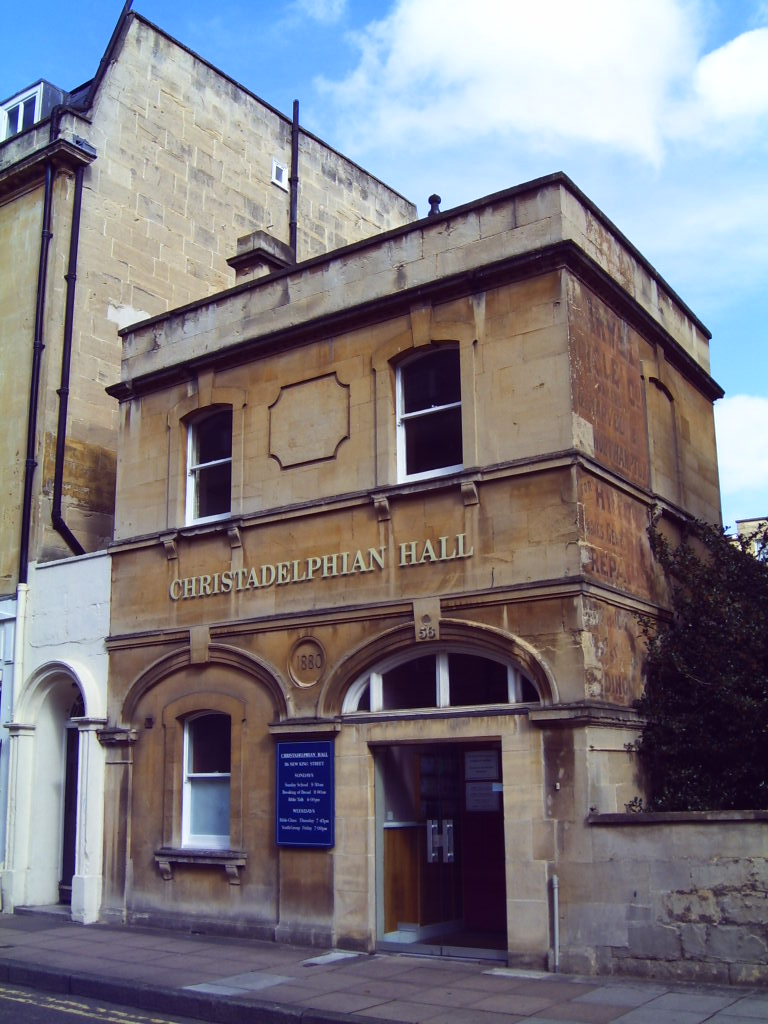
Christadelphian Hall, New King Street

Bath is covered by a number of Middle Layer Super Output Areas (MSOAs) in the 2021–22 United Kingdom census, namely Newbridge, Weston, Central Bath and Lansdown, Lambridge and Fairfield Park, Walcot, Kingsmead, Oldfield Park West, Oldfield Park East, Southdown, Twerton, Bloomfield, Combe Down, and Widcombe, Bathwick Hill and Claverton Down.

The population density of Bath's MSOAs ranged between 1,873 inhabitants per square kilometre (4,850 inhabitants per square mile) (Widcombe, Bathwick Hill and Claverton Down) and 8,888/km^{2} (23,020/sq mi) (Oldfield Park West), compared to 559/km^{2} (1,450/sq mi) for B&NES. The male–female divide ranged from 49.3% female (Widcombe, Bathwick Hill and Claverton Down) and 53.4% female (Newbridge), compared to 51.2% female for B&NES. Only 22.6% of residents in Oldfield Park West were married or in a registered civil partnership compared to 53.7% in Bloomfield, and 43.4% for the whole of B&NES. The proportion of residents living in a family household ranged from 45.5% (Oldfield Park West) to 66.8% (Bloomfield), compared to 61.9% for B&NES. Between 29.9% (Bloomfield) and 52.2% (Oldfield Park West) have a maximum qualification level of 1–3 (secondary school equivalent), and between 24.6% (Twerton) and 58.1% (Bloomfield) have level 4 or above (i.e. a university-level equivalent).

The MSOAs in Bath and their respective Indices of Multiple Deprivation

The MSOA with the lowest proportion of households owning their property (either outright or with debt) was Twerton at 36.9%, with the highest being 77.3% in Bloomfield; the figure for the whole of B&NES was 66.3%. Homeownership with debt has decreased in all of Bath's MSOAs since the 2011 census except Central Bath and Lansdown (+0.6pp) and Combe Down (+1.6pp), decreasing by as much as –6.0pp in Oldfield Park West. However, outright home ownership has increased in all MSOAs except Weston (–2.2pp), Oldfield Park West (–6.7pp), and Combe Down (–0.3pp), increasing as much as +4.5pp in Lambridge and Fairfield Park. In all of Bath's MSOAs, over 75% of residents were born in the UK, except Bath Central and Lansdown, where it was 74.3%, with the figure as high as 88.1% in Southdown. Throughout B&NES, where 87.9% of residents were born in the UK, the highest other proportion was 5.4% for those born in Europe outside the British Isles. The Indices of Multiple Deprivation for the town's households show that less than 1% in all MSOAs are deprived in four dimensions, Twerton being the highest at 0.8%. Only in Twerton, Southdown, and Oldfield Park East is the median household deprived in one dimension; in all other MSOAs, the median household is not deprived in any dimension.

=== Population change ===
The table and graph below details the population change since 1851, including the percentage change per annum. Percentage change per year is calculated as an average between two data points.

Population growth in Bath since 1379
Year	1379	1700	1801	1831	1841	1851	1881	1891	1901	1971	1991	2001	2011	2021
Population	1,100	2,000	28,000	57,000	53,196	54,240	52,557	52,000	49,839	84,670	78,689	83,992	88,859	94,080
% change / year	—	+0.3%	+12.9%	+3.5%	–0.7%	+0.2%	–0.1%	–0.1%	–0.4%	1.0%	–0.4%	+0.7%	+0.6%	+0.6%
Source														

View source data.

== Economy ==
=== Industry ===
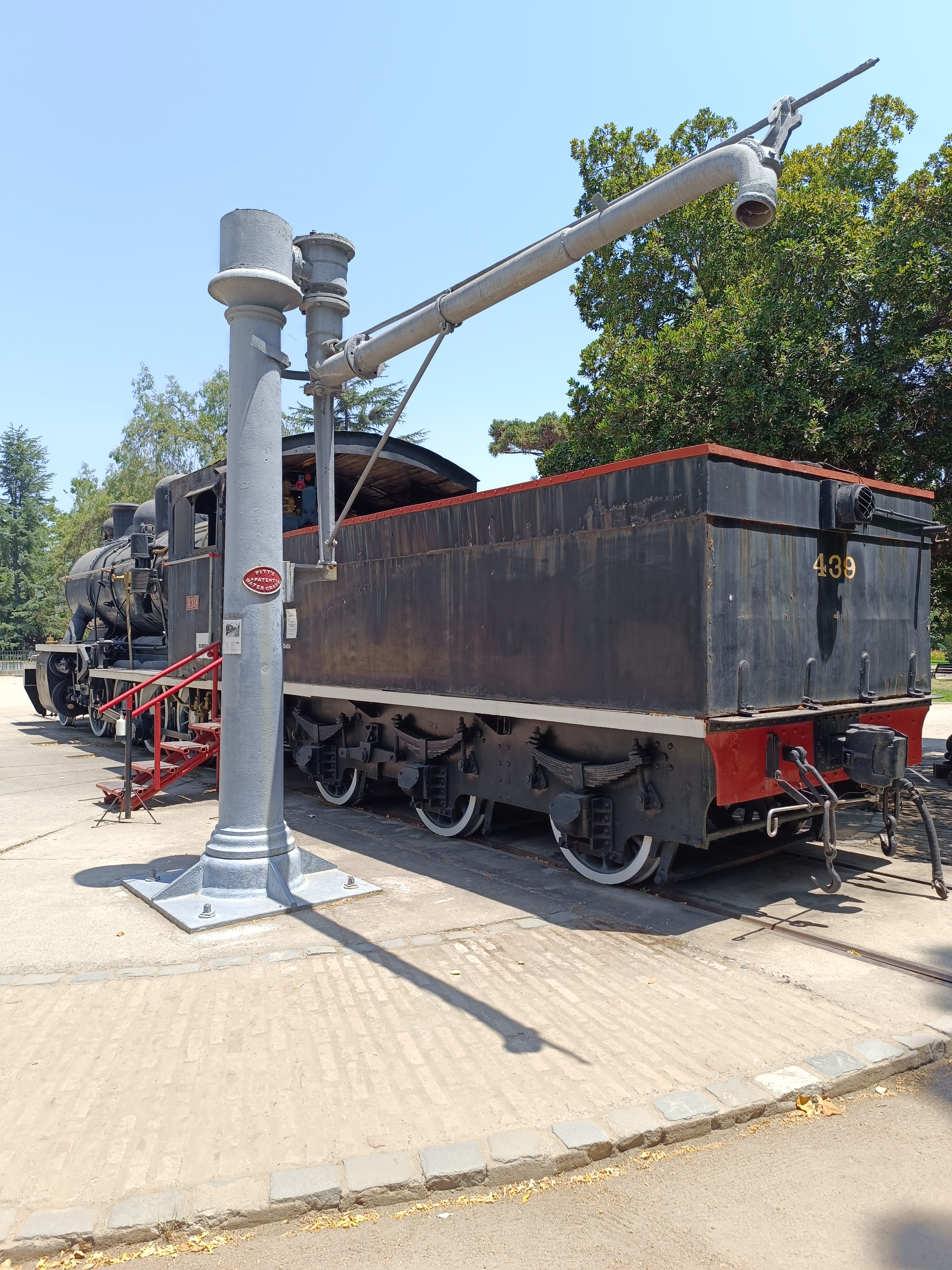
A water crane made by Stothert & Pitt Engineers in 1875, now at the Santiago Railway Museum

Bath once had an important manufacturing sector, particularly in crane manufacture, furniture manufacture, printing, brass foundries, quarries, dye works and Plasticine manufacture, as well as many mills. In the modern day, industry is in decline, and the economy has pivoted towards advanced electronics, software, and service-oriented industries. This has included the Bath-based company Future Publishing moving from print to gaming and digital formats.

During and after World War II, Bath was home to Ministry of Defence offices, with three large sites on the outskirts (Ensleigh, Foxhill and Warminster Road) and a number of smaller central offices, including the Empire Hotel. After the end of the Cold War, staff numbers declined, and from 2010 to 2013 about 2,600 remaining staff were moved to MoD Abbey Wood in Bristol. In 2013 the three large sites were sold for the development of over 1,000 new houses.

Major employers are the National Health Service, Bath Spa University, the University of Bath, and Bath and North East Somerset Council. Significant employment sectors include information and communication technologies and creative and cultural industries where Bath is one of the recognised national centres for publishing, with the magazine and digital publisher Future plc employing around 650. Others include Buro Happold (400) and IPL Information Processing Limited (250). In 2011 the city had over 400 retail shops, half of them run by independent specialist retailers, and around 100 restaurants and cafes primarily supported by tourism.

=== Tourism ===
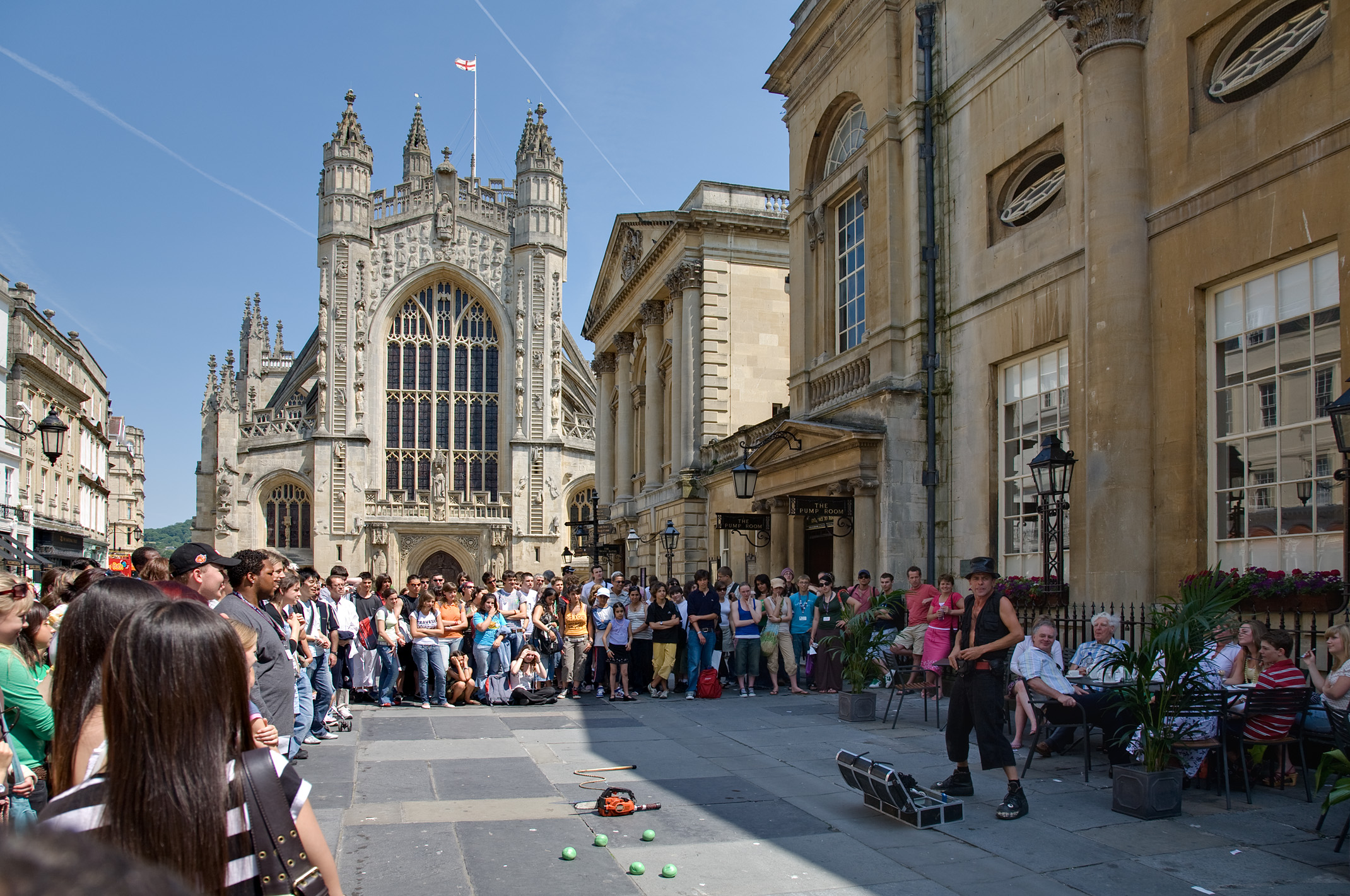
An entertainer performing in front of Bath Abbey

One of Bath's principal industries is tourism; by 2022 the city was hosting more than six million visitors per year. In 2019, there were 401,000 overnight visits to the city, the ninth-most in England. The visits mainly fall into the categories of heritage tourism and cultural tourism, aided by the city's World Heritage Site status. Bath was one of the first British cities to have open top bus tours. At least four operators offered different tours at one time but new regulations in 2006 left just the Bath Bus Company's two tours which use the international 'City Sightseeing' brand.

Since the opening of Thermae Bath Spa in 2006, the city has attempted to recapture its historical position as the only town or city in the United Kingdom offering visitors the opportunity to bathe in naturally heated spring waters. In the 2010 Google Street View Best Streets Awards, the Royal Crescent took second place in the "Britain's Most Picturesque Street" award, first place being given to The Shambles in York. Milsom Street was also awarded "Britain's Best Fashion Street".

== Architecture ==
There are many Roman archaeological sites throughout the central area of the city. The baths themselves are about 6 metres (20 ft) below the present city street level. Around the hot springs, Roman foundations, pillar bases, and baths can still be seen; however, all the stonework above the level of the baths is from more recent periods.

Bath Abbey was a Norman church built on earlier foundations. The present building dates from the early 16th century and shows a late Perpendicular style with flying buttresses and crocketed pinnacles decorating a crenellated and pierced parapet. The choir and transepts have a fan vault by Robert and William Vertue. A matching vault was added to the nave in the 19th century. The building is lit by 52 windows.

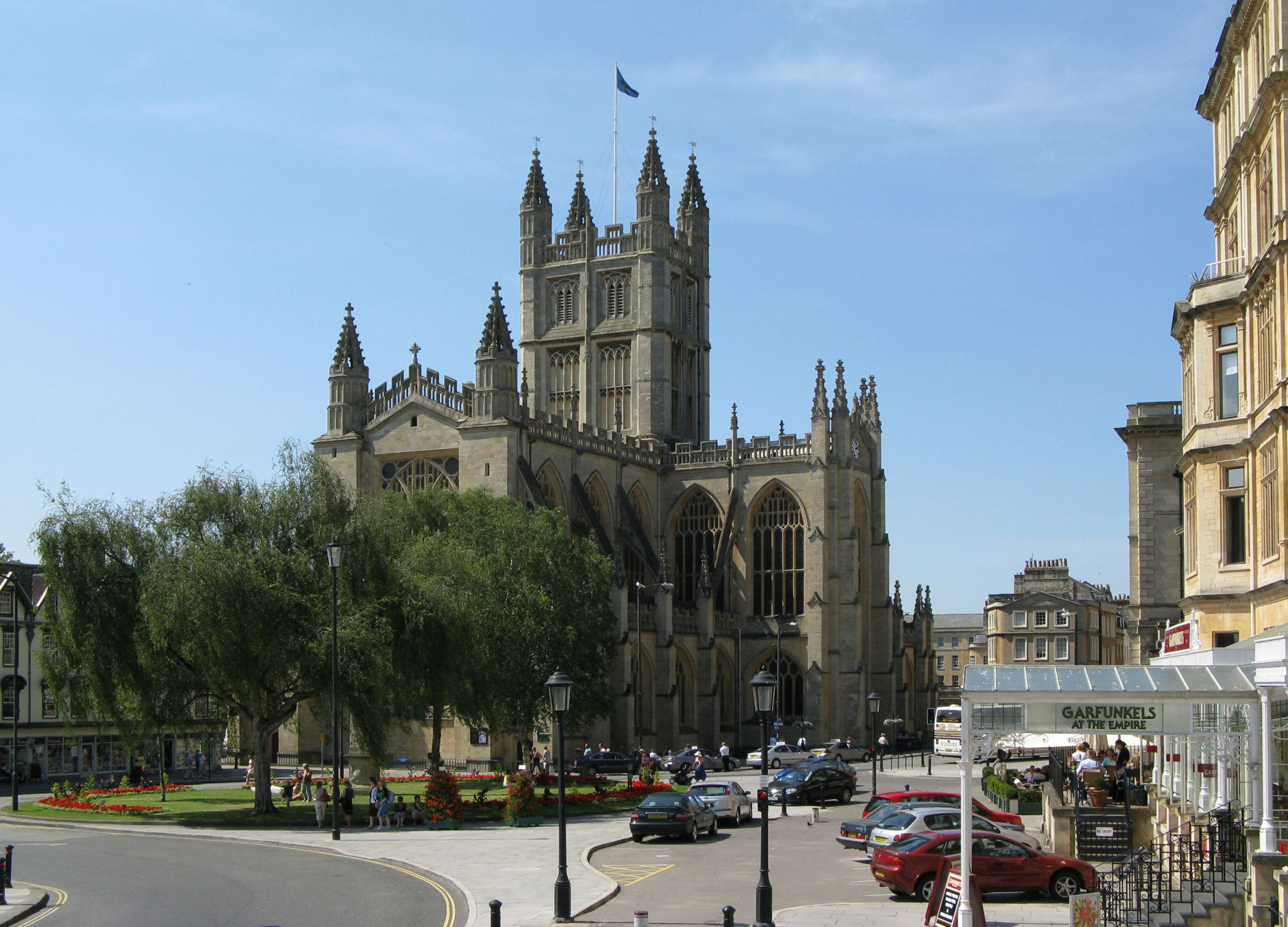
Bath Abbey seen from the east

Most buildings in Bath are made from the local, golden-coloured Bath stone, and many date from the 18th and 19th century. The dominant style of architecture in Central Bath is Georgian; this style evolved from the Palladian revival style that became popular in the early 18th century. Many of the prominent architects of the day were employed in the development of the city. The masons Reeves of Bath were prominent in the city from the 1770s to 1860s.

The Circus consists of three long, curved terraces designed by the elder John Wood to form a circular space or theatre intended for civic functions and games. The games give a clue to the design, the inspiration behind which was the Colosseum in Rome. Like the Colosseum, the three façades have a different order of architecture on each floor: Doric on the ground level, then Ionic on the piano nobile, and finishing with Corinthian on the upper floor, the style of the building thus becoming progressively more ornate as it rises. Wood never lived to see his unique example of town planning completed as he died five days after personally laying the foundation stone on 18 May 1754.

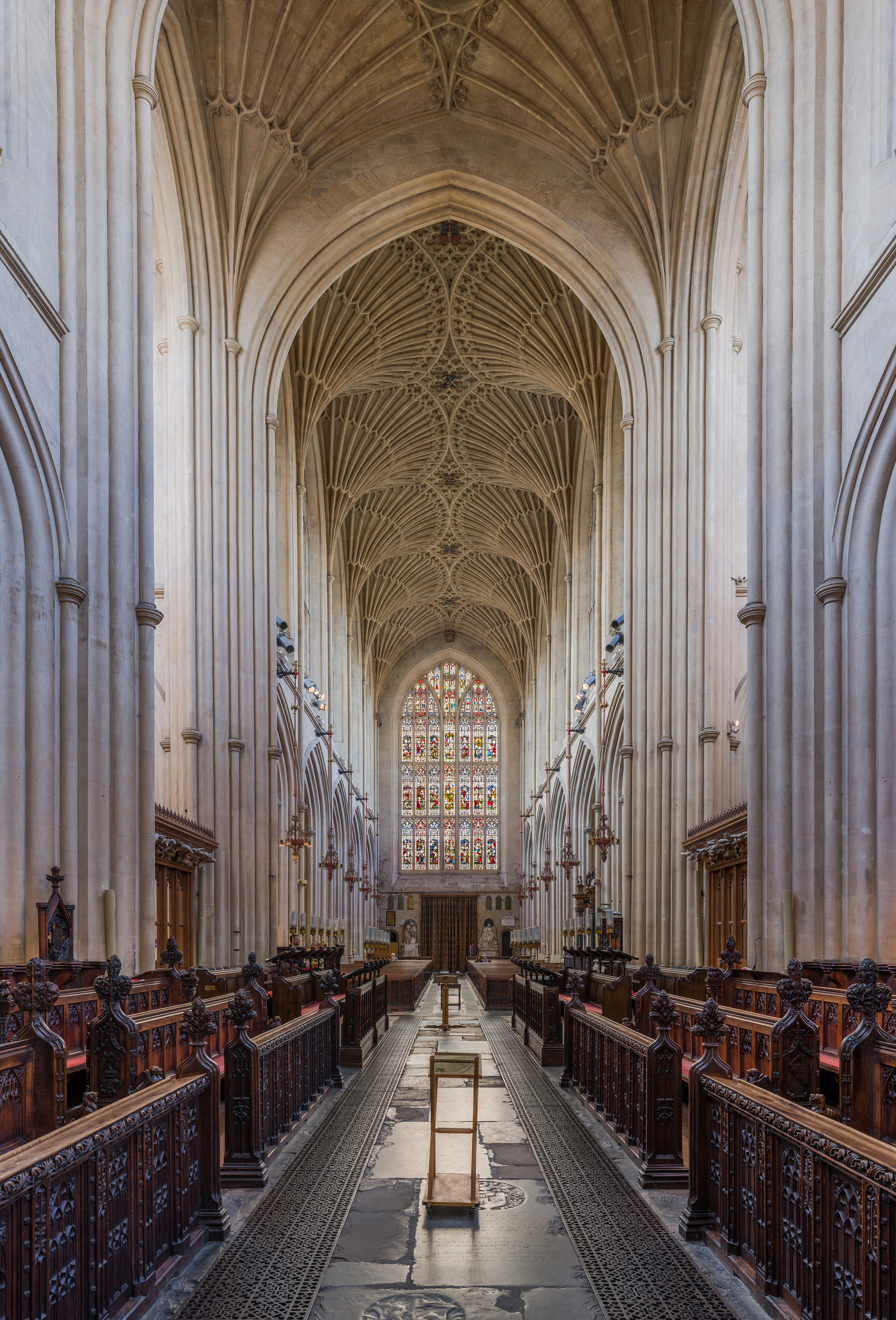
Fan vaulting over the nave at Bath Abbey

The most spectacular of Bath's terraces is the Royal Crescent, built between 1767 and 1774 and designed by the younger John Wood. Wood designed the great curved façade of what appears to be about 30 houses with Ionic columns on a rusticated ground floor, but that was the extent of his input: each purchaser bought a certain length of the façade, and then employed their own architect to build a house to their own specifications behind it; hence what appears to be two houses is in some cases just one. Thus, while the front is completely uniform and symmetrical, the rear is a mixture of differing dimensions and architecture. This so-called "Queen Anne fronts and Mary-Anne backs" architecture is common in Bath and was designed to keep hired women at the back of the house. Other fine terraces elsewhere in the city include Lansdown Crescent and Somerset Place on the northern hill.

Around 1770, the neoclassical architect Robert Adam designed Pulteney Bridge, using as the prototype for the three-arched bridge spanning the Avon an original, but unused, design by Andrea Palladio for the Rialto Bridge in Venice. Thus, Pulteney Bridge became not just a means of crossing the river, but also a shopping arcade. Along with the Rialto Bridge and the Ponte Vecchio in Florence, which it resembles, it is one of the very few surviving bridges in Europe to serve this dual purpose. It has been substantially altered since it was built. The bridge was named after Frances and William Pulteney, the owners of the Bathwick estate for which the bridge provided a link to the rest of Bath.

The heart of the Georgian city was the Grand Pump Room, which, together with its associated Lower Assembly Rooms, was designed by Thomas Baldwin, a local builder responsible for many other buildings in the city, including the terraces in Argyle Street and the Guildhall. In 1776, Baldwin was made the chief City Surveyor, and Bath City Architect. Great Pulteney Street, where he eventually lived, is another of his works: this wide boulevard, constructed around 1789 and over 1,000 feet (305 m) long and 100 feet (30 m) wide, is lined on both sides by Georgian terraces.

In the 1960s and early 1970s some parts of Bath were unsympathetically redeveloped, resulting in the loss of some 18th- and 19th-century buildings. This process was largely halted by a popular campaign which drew strength from the publication of Adam Fergusson's The Sack of Bath. Controversy has revived periodically, most recently with the demolition of the 1930s Churchill House, a neo-Georgian municipal building originally housing the Electricity Board, to make way for a new bus station. This is part of the Southgate redevelopment in which an ill-favoured 1960s shopping precinct, bus station and multi-storey car park were demolished and replaced by a new area of neo-Georgian shopping streets.

As a result of this and other changes, notably plans for abandoned industrial land along the Avon, the city's status as a World Heritage Site was reviewed by UNESCO in 2009. The decision was made to let Bath keep its status, but UNESCO asked to be consulted on future phases of the Riverside development, saying that the density and volume of buildings in the second and third phases of the development need to be reconsidered. It also demanded Bath do more to attract world-class architecture in new developments. In 2021, Bath received its second UNESCO World Heritage inscription, becoming part of a group of 11 spa towns across 7 countries that were listed by UNESCO as the "Great Spas of Europe".

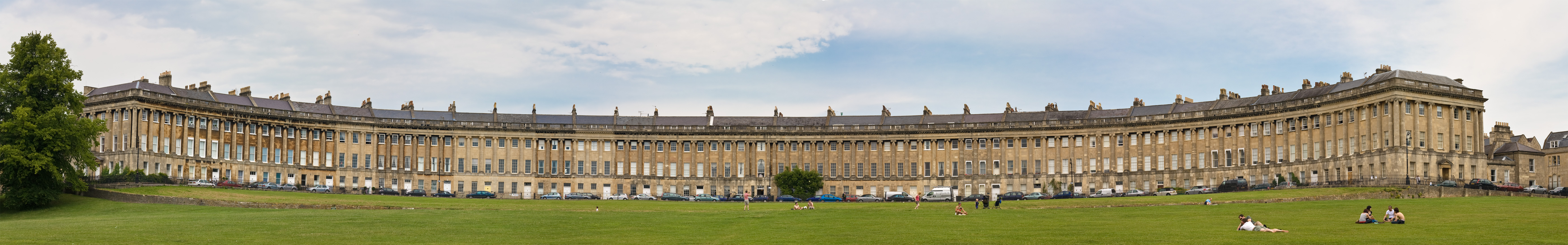
Panoramic view of the Royal Crescent

== Culture ==
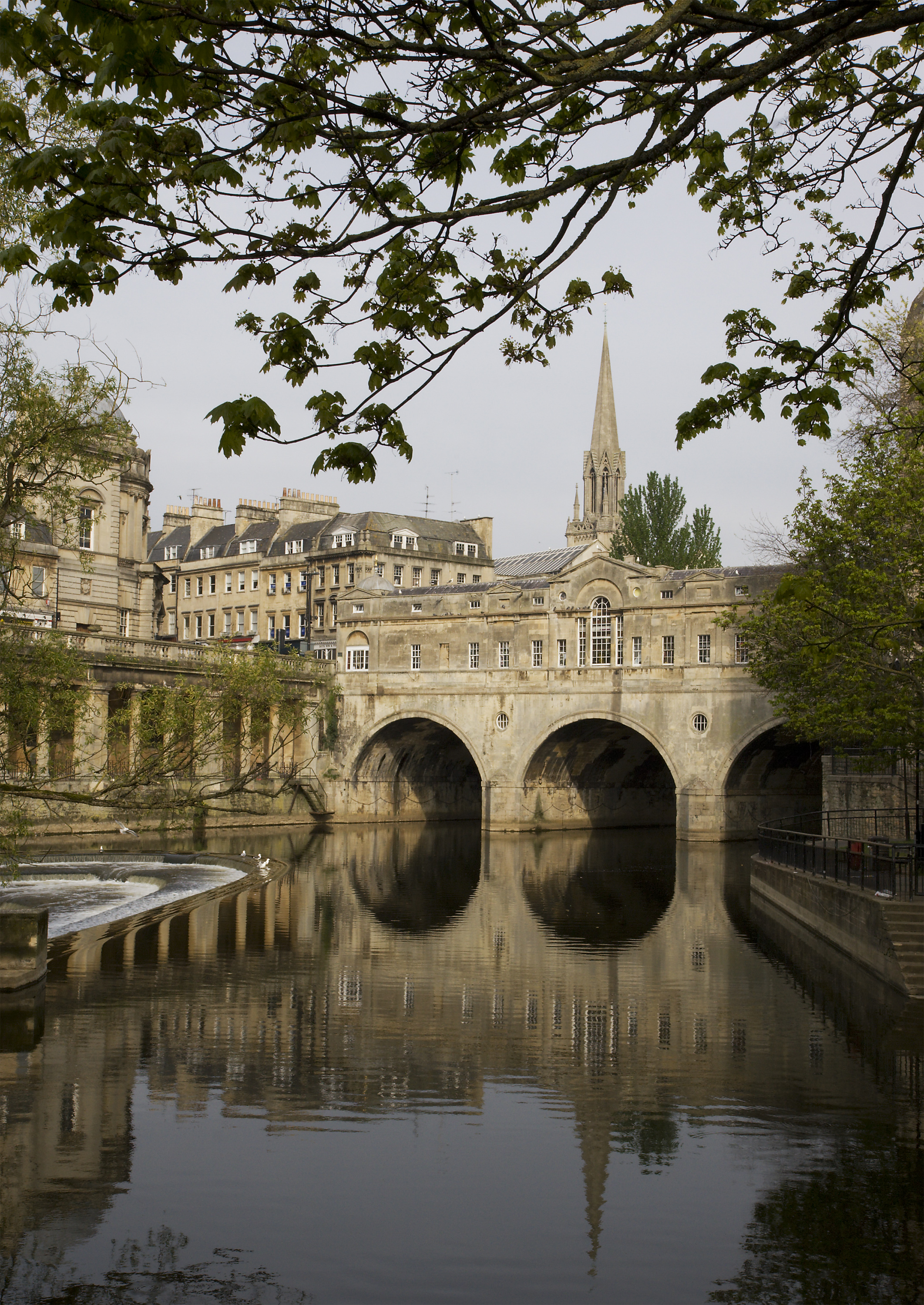
18th-century Pulteney Bridge, designed by Robert Adam

Bath became the centre of fashionable life in England during the 18th century when its Old Orchard Street Theatre and architectural developments such as Lansdown Crescent, the Royal Crescent, The Circus, and Pulteney Bridge were built.

Bath's five theatres – Theatre Royal, Ustinov Studio, the Egg, the Rondo Theatre, and the Mission Theatre – attract internationally renowned companies and directors and an annual season by Sir Peter Hall. The city has a long-standing musical tradition; Bath Abbey, home to the Klais Organ and the largest concert venue in the city, stages about 20 concerts and 26 organ recitals each year. Another concert venue, the art deco-style 1,600-seat The Forum, originated as a cinema. The city holds the annual Bath International Music Festival and Mozartfest, the annual Bath Literature Festival (and its counterpart for children), the Bath Film Festival, the Bath Digital Festival, the Bath Fringe Festival, the Bath Beer Festival and the Bath Chilli Festival. The Bach Festivals occur at two and a half-year intervals. An annual Bard of Bath competition aims to find the best poet, singer or storyteller.

The city is home to the Victoria Art Gallery, the Museum of East Asian Art, and Holburne Museum, numerous commercial art galleries and antique shops, as well as a number of other museums, among them Bath Postal Museum, the Fashion Museum, the Jane Austen Centre, the Herschel Museum of Astronomy and the Roman Baths. The Bath Royal Literary and Scientific Institution (BRLSI) in Queen Square was founded in 1824 from the Society for the encouragement of Agriculture, Planting, Manufactures, Commerce and the Fine Arts founded in 1777. In September 1864, BRLSI hosted the 34th annual meeting of the British Science Association, which was attended by explorers David Livingstone, Sir Richard Francis Burton, and John Hanning Speke. The history of the city is displayed at the Museum of Bath Architecture, which is housed in a building built in 1765 as the Trinity Presbyterian Church. It was also known as the Countess of Huntingdon's Chapel, as she lived in the attached house from 1707 to 1791.

=== The arts ===
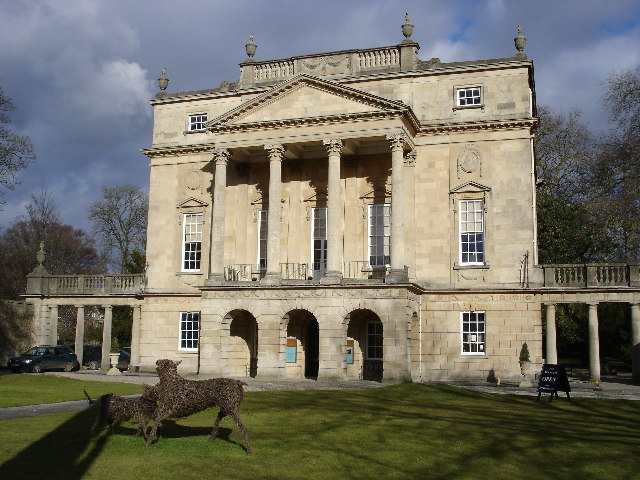
Holburne Museum

During the 18th century Thomas Gainsborough and Sir Thomas Lawrence lived and worked in Bath. John Maggs, a painter best known for coaching scenes, was born and lived in Bath with his artistic family. Satirist and political journalist William Hone was born in Bath in 1780. William Friese-Greene experimented with celluloid and motion pictures in his studio in the 1870s, developing some of the earliest movie camera technology. He is credited as being one of the inventors of cinematography.

Jane Austen lived at four addresses in the city between 1801 and 1806 with her mother, sister Cassandra, and father until his death in 1805. Some accounts say Jane Austen did not like the city, later writing to Cassandra that "it will be two years tomorrow since we left Bath for Clifton, with what happy feelings of escape". However, the two novels Austen set in the city, Northanger Abbey and Persuasion, come with fond descriptions of its "eager delights".

Charles Dickens mentions the city in The Pickwick Papers, in which Pickwick's servant, Sam Weller, comments that the waters of Bath have "a very strong flavour o' warm flat irons". The Royal Crescent is the venue for a chase between two characters, Dowler and Winkle. Moyra Caldecott's novel The Waters of Sul is set in Roman Bath in AD 72, and The Regency Detective, by David Lassman and Terence James, revolves around the exploits of Jack Swann investigating deaths in the city during the early 19th century. Richard Brinsley Sheridan's play The Rivals takes place in the city, as does Roald Dahl's chilling short story, The Landlady.

Many films and television programmes have been filmed using its architecture as the backdrop. In 2012, Pulteney Weir was used as a replacement location during post production of the film adaptation of Les Misérables. Stunt shots were filmed in October 2012 after footage acquired during the main filming period was found to have errors. The ITV police drama McDonald & Dodds is set and mostly filmed in Bath using many of the city's famous sites. In 2008, 104 decorated pigs were displayed around the city in a public art event called "King Bladud's Pigs in Bath". It celebrated the city, its origins and artists. Decorated pig sculptures were displayed throughout the summer and were auctioned to raise funds for Two Tunnels Greenway.

=== Parks ===
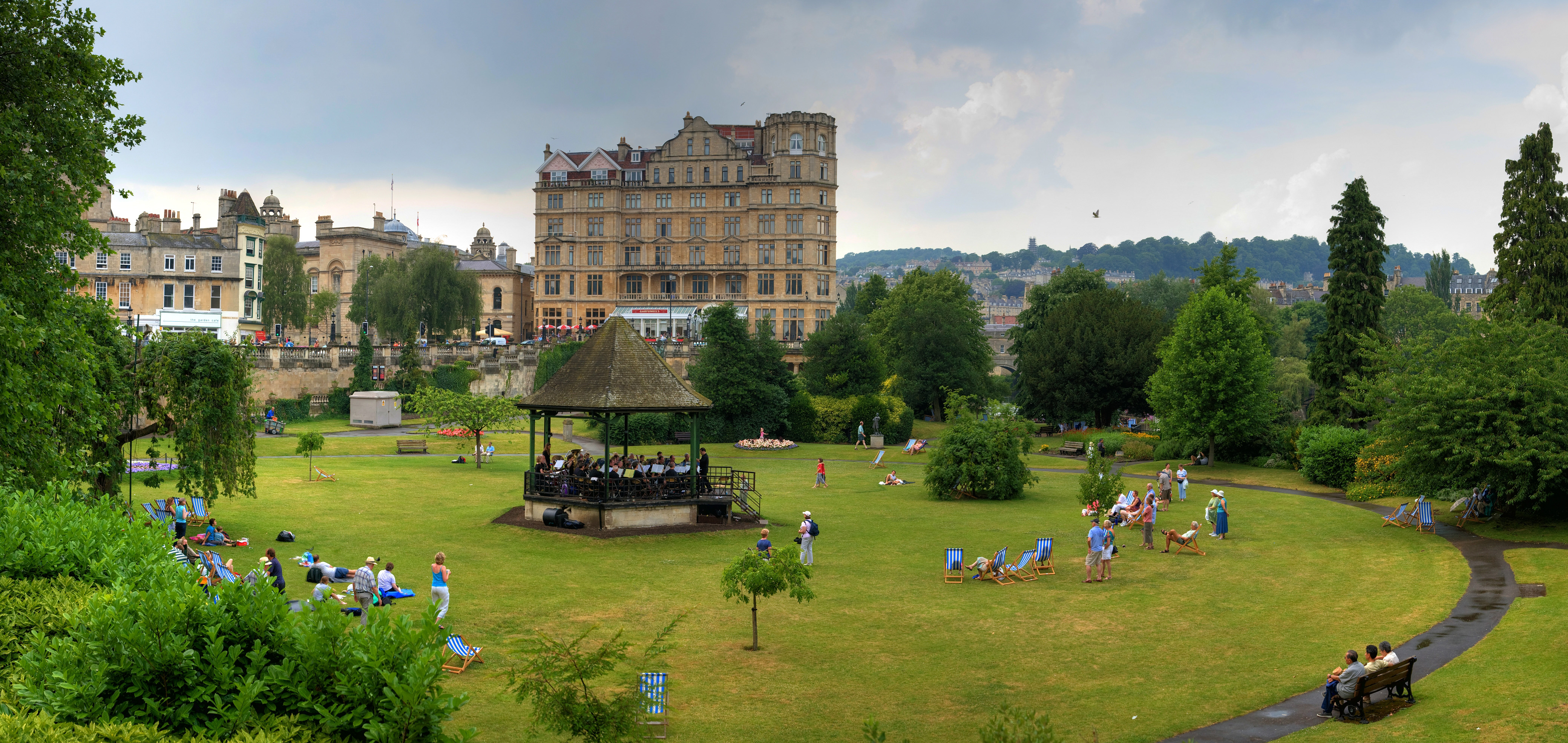
Parade Gardens and the Empire Hotel

Royal Victoria Park, a short walk from the city centre, was opened in 1830 by the 11-year-old Princess Victoria, and was the first park to carry her name. The public park is overlooked by the Royal Crescent and covers 23 hectares (57 acres). It has a skatepark, tennis courts, a bowling green, a putting green and a 12- and 18-hole golf course, a pond, open-air concerts, an annual travelling funfair at Easter, and a children's play area. Much of its area is lawn; a notable feature is a ha-ha that segregates it from the Royal Crescent while giving the impression from the Crescent of uninterrupted grassland across the park to Royal Avenue. The park has received the Green Flag Award, the national standard for parks and green spaces in England and Wales, and is registered by English Heritage as of National Historic Importance. The 3.84-hectare (9.5-acre) botanical gardens were founded in 1887 and contain one of the finest collections of plants on limestone in the West Country.

A replica Roman Temple was built at the British Empire Exhibition at Wembley in 1924, and, following the exhibition, was dismantled and rebuilt in Victoria Park in Bath. In 1987, the gardens were extended to include the Great Dell, a disused quarry with a collection of conifers.

Other parks include Alexandra Park on a hill overlooking the city; Parade Gardens, along the river near the abbey in the city centre; Sydney Gardens, an 18th-century pleasure garden; Henrietta Park; Hedgemead Park; and Alice Park. Jane Austen wrote "It would be pleasant to be near the Sydney Gardens. We could go into the Labyrinth every day." Alexandra, Alice and Henrietta parks were built into the growing city among the housing developments. Linear Park is built on the old Somerset and Dorset Joint Railway line, and connects with the Two Tunnels Greenway which contains the longest cycling and walking tunnel in the UK. Cleveland Pools were built around 1815 close to the River Avon, now the oldest surviving public outdoor lido in England. Restoration was completed in 2023, after a 20-year fund-raising campaign, with the lido opening for the first time in 40 years on 10 September.

Victoria Art Gallery and Royal Victoria Park are named after Queen Victoria, who wrote in her journal in 1837, "The people are really too kind to me." This feeling seemed to have been reciprocated by the people of Bath: "Lord James O'Brien brought a drawing of the intended pillar which the people of Bath are so kind as to erect in commemoration of my 18th birthday."

=== Food ===
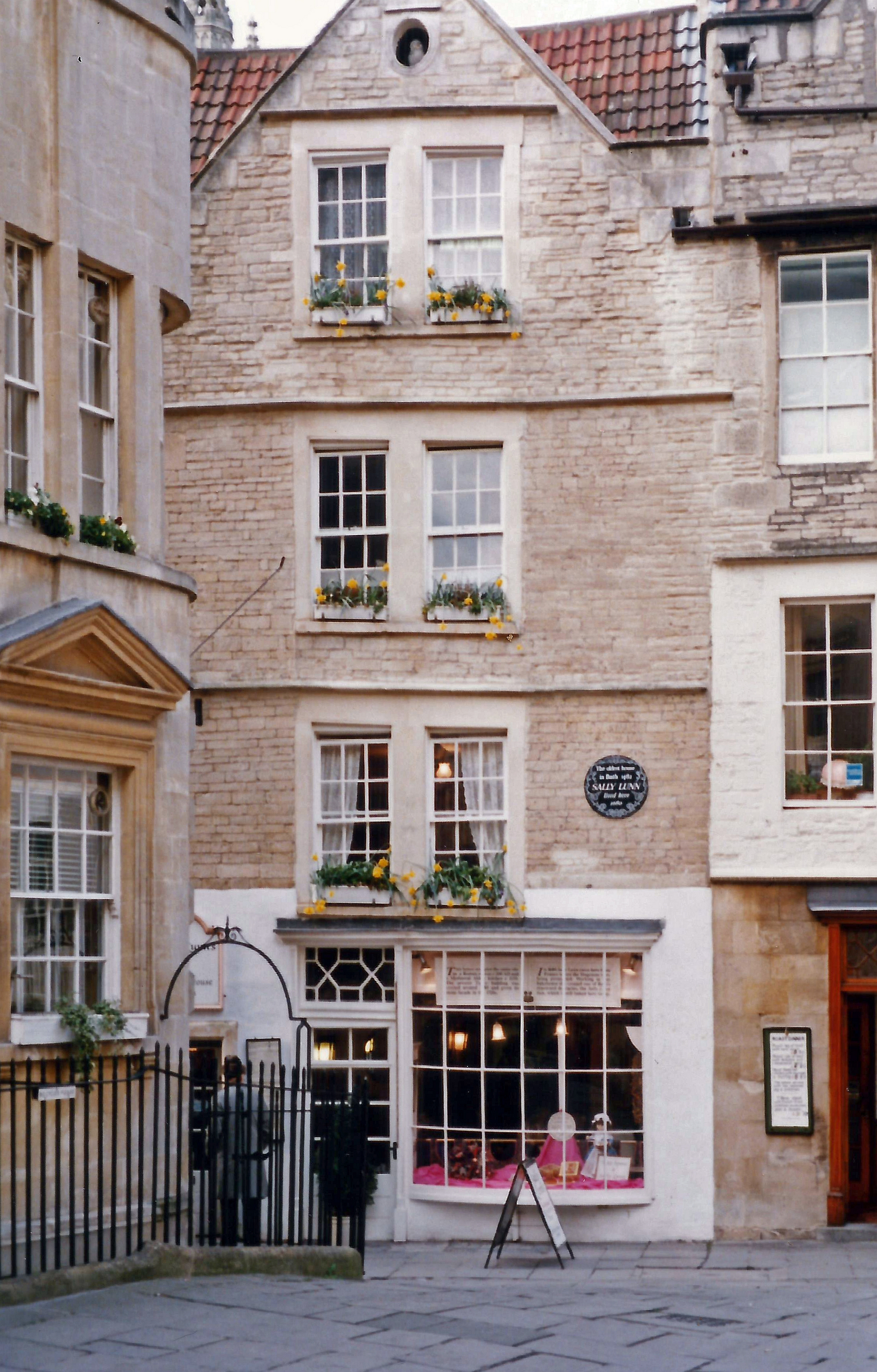
Sally Lunn's, home of the Sally Lunn bun

Several foods have an association with the city. Sally Lunn buns (a type of teacake) have long been baked in Bath. They were first mentioned by name in verses printed in the Bath Chronicle in 1772. At that time they were eaten hot at public breakfasts in Spring Gardens. They can be eaten with sweet or savoury toppings and are sometimes confused with Bath buns, which are smaller, round, very sweet and very rich. The latter were associated with the city following the Great Exhibition. Bath buns were originally topped with crushed comfits created by dipping caraway seeds repeatedly in boiling sugar; but today seeds are added to a 'London Bath Bun' (a reference to the bun's promotion and sale at the Great Exhibition). The seeds may be replaced by crushed sugar granules or 'nibs'.

Bath has also lent its name to Bath Olivers, a dry baked biscuit invented by Dr William Oliver, physician to the Mineral Water Hospital in 1740. Oliver was an anti-obesity campaigner and author of A Practical Essay on the Use and Abuse of warm Bathing in Gluty Cases. In more recent years, Oliver's efforts have been traduced by the introduction of a version of the biscuit with a plain chocolate coating. Bath chaps, the salted and smoked cheek and jawbones of the pig, takes its name from the city and is available from a stall in the daily covered market. Bath Ales brewery is located in Warmley and Abbey Ales are brewed in the city.

=== Twinning ===
City twinning is the responsibility of the Charter Trustees and each twinning arrangement is managed by a Twinning Association. Bath is twinned with four other cities in Europe:

- Aix-en-Provence, France
- Alkmaar, Netherlands
- Braunschweig, Germany
- Kaposvár, Hungary

There is also a historic connection with Manly, New South Wales, Australia, which is referred to as a sister city; a partnership arrangement with Beppu, Ōita Prefecture, Japan; and a friendship agreement with Oleksandriia, Kirovohrad Oblast, Ukraine.

== Media ==
Bath's local newspaper is the Bath Chronicle, which is owned by Local World. Published since 1760, the Chronicle was a daily newspaper until mid-September 2007, when it became a weekly. Since 2018 its website has been operated by Trinity Mirror's SomersetLive platform. The BBC Bristol website has featured coverage of news and events within Bath since 2003. For television, Bath is served by the BBC West studios based at Broadcasting House in Bristol, and by ITV West Country, formerly HTV, also from studios in Bristol. Radio stations broadcasting to the city include BBC Radio Bristol, BBC Radio Somerset in Taunton, Greatest Hits Radio South West and Heart West, formerly GWR FM.

== Transport ==
=== Railways ===
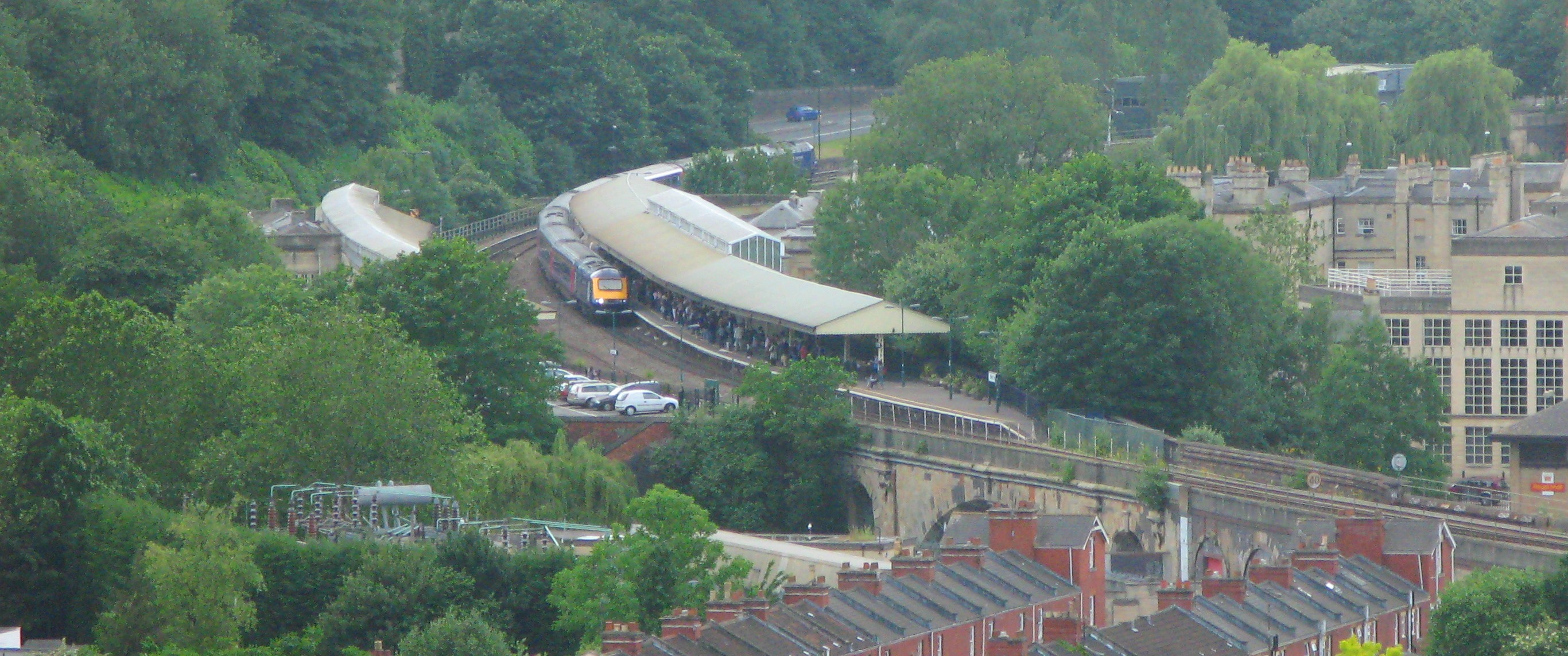
Bath Spa railway station

The city's principal railway station is Bath Spa, which opened in 1840 on the Great Western Main Line and was designed by Isambard Kingdom Brunel. Services are provided by Great Western Railway to cities such as London, Cardiff, Bristol, and Gloucester. The adjacent Royal Station Hotel was constructed by the GWR and opened five years after the station. It was designed as a luxury hotel whose guests included Queen Victoria. The hotel's first floor originally had a direct link to the station platforms via a footbridge.

Bath Spa station is notable for its wide spacing between the platforms because it originally had two carriage sidings in between, and all the lines were broad gauge. The original station featured a hammerbeam roof, but its was removed in 1897 when the platforms were extended.

A suburban station on the line towards Bristol opened in 1929 at Oldfield Park; it is only served by local trains. Green Park station was the terminus of the Midland Railway to Bristol and Gloucester from 1869, and of the Somerset and Dorset Joint Railway, which served the area to the south, from 1874. Passenger services ended in 1966 and goods traffic five years later. The main station building is now used by small shops and markets while a supermarket has been built on land beyond the station's train shed.

=== Trams ===
The Bath Tramways Company began operations on 24 December 1880. The 4 ft (1,219 mm) gauge cars were horse-drawn along a route from London Road to the railway station. The system closed in 1902 and was replaced by electric tramcars on a greatly expanded 4 ft 8 1/2 in (1,435 mm) gauge system that opened in 1904. This eventually extended to 18 miles (29 km) with routes to Combe Down, Oldfield Park, Twerton, Newton St Loe, Weston and Bathford. There was a fleet of 40 cars, all but six being double deck. The first line to close was replaced by a bus service in 1938, and the last went on 6 May 1939.

In 2005, a detailed plan was presented to the council to reintroduce trams to Bath, but was rejected in favour of a park-and-ride busway to Newbridge Park. In 2015, Bath Trams created interest in the idea of reintroducing trams with several public meetings and meetings with the council. In 2017, Bath and North East Somerset Council announced a feasibility study into a light rail or tram system. In November 2016, the West of England Local Enterprise Partnership began a consultation process on their proposals for light rail or tram routes in the region, one of them a route from Bristol city centre along the A4 road to Bath to relieve pressure on bus and rail services between the two cities. In July 2026, this metro system was backed by the prime minister, citing the Bath–Bristol region as the only city region in the UK without some kind of light transit system.

=== Buses ===
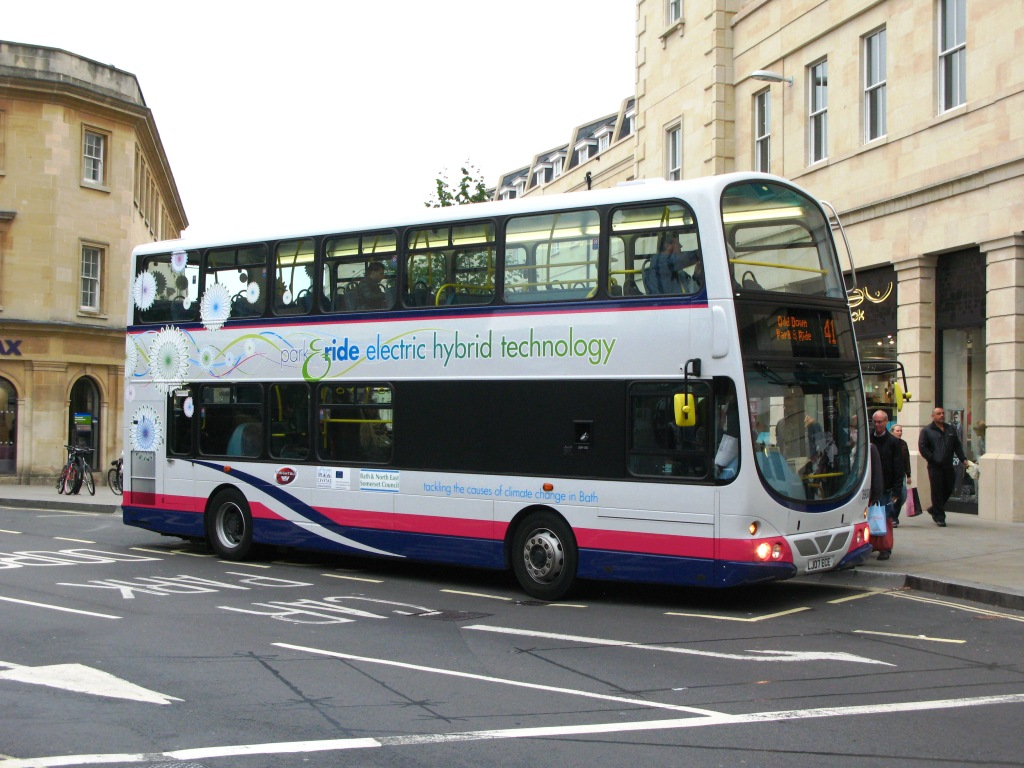
A diesel–electric hybrid bus in SouthGate on a Park and Ride service in 2010

Bath has a network of bus routes, operated by First West of England, with services to Bristol Airport and nearby towns and cities such as Bristol, Trowbridge, Frome and Wells. Faresaver Buses also operate services to surrounding towns. The suburbs of Bath are also served by the WESTlink on-demand minibus service.

National Express and FlixBus operate inter-city coach services from Bath bus station which is adjacent to Bath Spa railway station. The Bath Bus Company runs open top bus tours around the city.

=== Roads ===
Bath is approximately 11 miles (18 km) south-east of the larger city and port of Bristol, to which it is linked by the A4 road and is a similar distance south of the M4 motorway at junction 18. The potential new junction 18a linking the M4 with the A4174 Avon Ring Road could provide an additional direct route from Bath to the motorway. The 2004 Bristol/Bath to South Coast Study was initiated by the Government Office for the South West and Bath and North East Somerset Council and undertaken by WSP Global after the A36 and A46 were de-trunked in 1999. The study showed that an A36–A46 link road to the east of Bath would significantly reduce HGV traffic in Bath, Trowbridge, and Bradford on Avon. The proposed link road was costed at £40M.

In an attempt to reduce the level of car use, park and ride schemes have been introduced, with sites at Odd Down, Lansdown and Newbridge. A large increase in city centre parking was provided under the 2010 SouthGate shopping centre development, which introduced more car traffic. A bus gate scheme in Northgate aims to reduce private car use in the city centre. The Bath Clean Air Zone was introduced for central Bath on 15 March 2021. A Class C zone, it charges the most polluting commercial vehicles £9 per day (and up to £100 per day for coaches and HGVs). It is the first UK road pollution charging zone outside London, and reduced nitrogen dioxide levels in the city by 26% over the following two years, meeting legal standards.

=== Other modes of transport ===
Bath is on National Cycle Route 4, with one of Britain's first cycleways, the Bristol and Bath Railway Path, to the west, and an eastern route toward London on the canal towpath. Bath is about 20 miles (30 km) from Bristol Airport. Bath also benefits from several bridleways and byways.

Bath is connected to Bristol and the sea by the River Avon, navigable via locks by small boats. The river was connected to the Thames and London by the Kennet and Avon Canal in 1810 via Bath Locks; this waterway, closed for many years but restored in the last years of the 20th century, is now popular with narrowboat users.

== Education ==
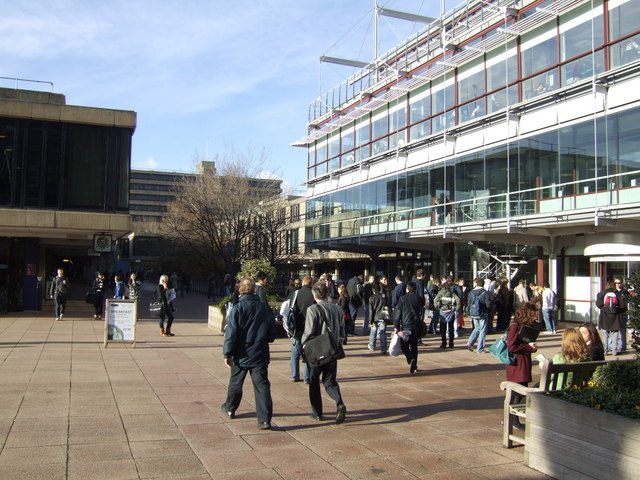
The University of Bath

Bath has two universities, the University of Bath and Bath Spa University. Bath College offers further education, and Norland College provides education and training in childcare.

Established in 1966, the University of Bath was named University of the Year by The Sunday Times in 2011. It offers programs in politics, languages, the physical sciences, engineering, mathematics, architecture, management and technology. The University of Bath has a single umbrella name for its sports teams: TeamBath. Sports for which TeamBath is noted are football, athletics, badminton, basketball, bob skeleton, bobsleigh, hockey, judo, modern pentathlon, netball, rugby union, swimming, tennis, triathlon and volleyball. The City of Bath Triathlon takes place annually at the university.

Bath Spa University grew from a post-World War II teacher training college to being granted university status in 2005. It offers courses leading to a Postgraduate Certificate in Education. It has schools in the following subject areas: Art and Design, Education, English and Creative Studies, Historical and Cultural Studies, Music and the Performing Arts, Science and the Environment and Social Sciences.

== Sport ==
Many cricket clubs are based in the city, including Bath Cricket Club, who are based at the North Parade Ground and play in the West of England Premier League. Cricket is also played on the Recreation Ground, just across from the rugby club. The Recreation Ground is also home to Bath Croquet Club, which was re-formed in 1976 and is affiliated with the South West Federation of Croquet Clubs. The Bath Half Marathon is run annually through the city streets, with over 10,000 runners.

=== Rugby ===
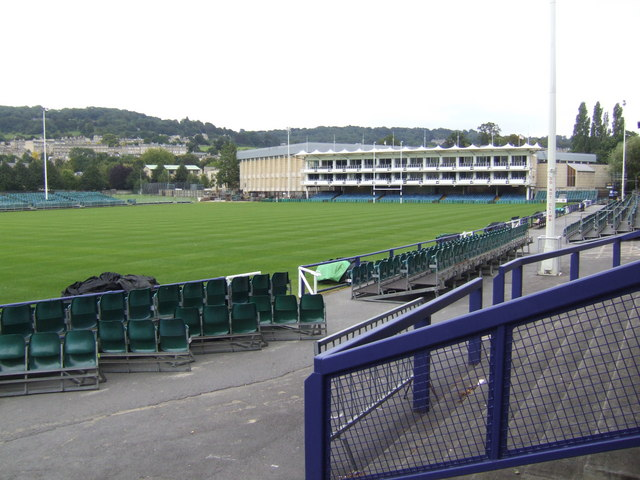
The Recreation Ground

Bath Rugby is a rugby union team who play in the Premiership, England's top division of rugby. It plays in blue, white and black kit at the Recreation Ground in the city, where it has been since the late 19th century, following its establishment in 1865. Bath Rugby is highly successful; this was especially the case between 1984 and 1998, when it won 10 Domestic Cups, 6 of its 7 League titles, and became the first English side to win the European Cup in 1998.

Bath was described by former head coach Jack Rowell as “a Georgian city, a Roman city, but more so than that, it’s a rugby city”. Bath Rugby routinely sell out matches at the 14,509-capacity Recreation Ground, and in 2024 the club submitted updated plans to redevelop it into a modern, 18,000-capacity stadium. In June 2025, Bath won their first Premiership Rugby title in 29 years, completing the third leg of a historic treble, having already secured the Premiership Rugby Cup and the European Rugby Challenge Cup earlier that season. The following day, thousands of supporters lined the streets for a victory parade. Players travelled on two open-top buses across Pulteney Bridge and up Milsom Street, before heading towards Bath Abbey and ending at The Recreation Ground, where a ticketed party was held.

=== Football ===
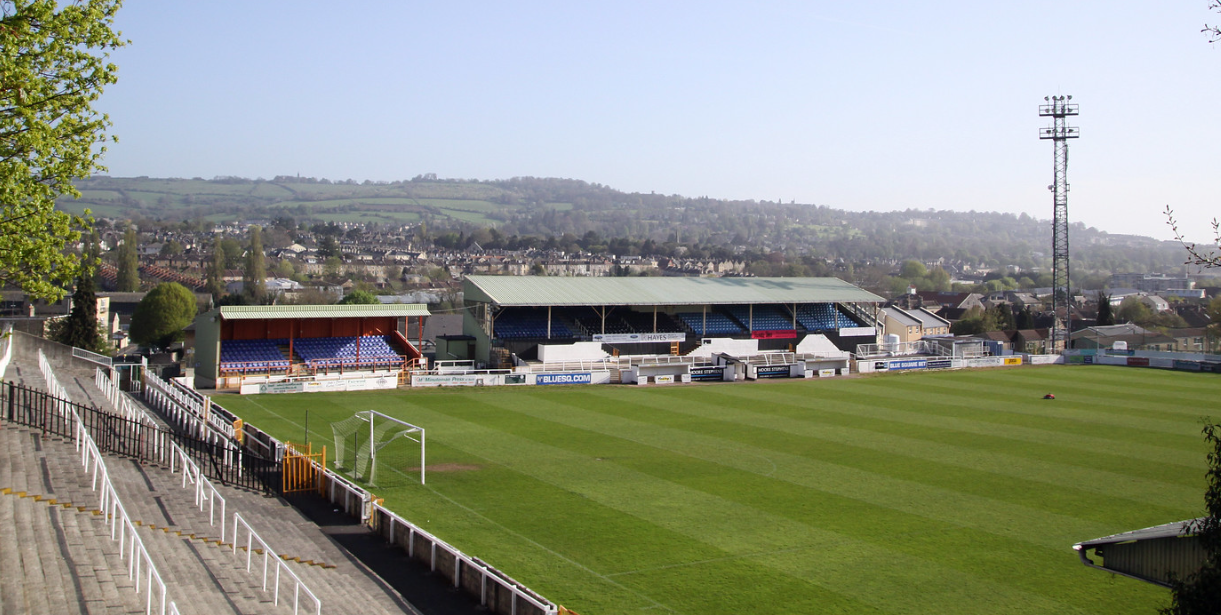
Twerton Park

Bath City F.C. is the semi-professional football team for the city. Founded in 1889, the club has played their home matches at Twerton Park since 1932. Bath City's history is entirely in non-league football, predominantly in the 5th tier. Bath narrowly missed out on election to the Football League by a few votes in 1978 and again in 1985. The club have a good history in the FA Cup, reaching the third round six times. The record attendance, 18,020, at the ground was in 1960 against Brighton. The club's colours are black and white and their official nickname is "The Romans", stemming from Bath's Ancient Roman history.

Until 2009, Team Bath F.C. operated as an affiliate to the University Athletics programme. In 2002, Team Bath became the first university team to enter the FA Cup in 120 years, and advanced through four qualifying rounds to the first round proper. The university's team was established in 1999 while the city team has existed since before 1908 (when it entered the Western League). However, in 2009, the Football Conference ruled that Team Bath would not be eligible to gain promotion to a National division, nor were they allowed to participate in Football Association cup competitions. This ruling led to the decision by the club to fold at the end of the 2008–09 Conference South competition. In their final season, Team Bath F.C. finished 11th in the league.

== See also ==
- The Bathonian Age (168.3 – 166.1 million years ago), a Jurassic Period of geological time named after Bath
- Grade I listed buildings in Bath and North East Somerset
- List of people from Bath
- List of Roman public baths
- List of spa towns in the United Kingdom
- Bath, Ontario, named after the city, and now part of Loyalist, Ontario
- Bath, North Carolina, also named after the city
