= Bard of Bath =

Poetry competition winner in Bath, England

The Bard of Bath is a prestigious title awarded to the winner of an annual competition designed to discover Bath's finest poet, singer, or storyteller. This competition takes place each year, featuring a different theme that invites participants to submit a manifesto alongside a performance piece.

The title revives an Iron Age Celtic Druid tradition, where Druids served as law-makers, judges, and ceremonial leaders; Ovates acted as mediums, healers, and prophets; Bards were poets, musicians and history-keepers. All of them held high status and a place in mystical/religious circles.

Each Chaired Bard becomes a member of the Gorsedd and retains their title (specified by year). The current Bard of Bath, as of November 2024, is Michelle Hawkins-Collins.

In 2025, the theme was “Home,” and Michelle won the competition with her performance titled "Home is Not a Place but a Presence." Her piece drew inspiration from the life of her grandmother, who lost her home at the age of 12 during World War II and grew up in a concentration camp in East Germany.

== Winners ==
- Tim Sebastian, 1996–97
- Richard Carder, 1997-8
- Kevan Manwaring, 1998-9
- Olivia Hicks, 1999–2000
- Julian Landau, 2000-1
- Brendan Georgeson, 2001-2
- Mark Lindsey Earley, 2002-3
- Helen Moore, 2003-4
- Jordan Ashley Hill 2004-5
- Mo the People's Nun, 2005-6
- Ash Mandrake, 2006–2007
- Thommie Gillow, 2007–2008
- Master Duncan, 2008–2009
- Jack Dean, 2009–2010
- Jennifer Walter 2010-2012 (re-elected)
- 2012-2013 No Chair awarded
- Mark Westmore 2013-2014
- Sheila Broun 2014-2015
- Conor Whelan, 2019–20
- Tick Rowley, 2020-2022 (re-elected)
- Annabelle Cormack, 2022-2023
- Connor Walker, 2023-2024
- Michelle Hawkins-Collins, 2024-2025
