= Bristol/Bath to South Coast Study =

UK transportation study

- Ratified: 2004
- Author: WSP Group
- Purpose: Transportation study

The Bristol/Bath to South Coast Study is a transportation study initiated by the United Kingdom's Government Office for the South West and Bath and North East Somerset Council in South West England. It was undertaken by WSP Group as a result of the de-trunking in 1999 of the A36/A46 trunk road network from Bath to Southampton. The final study reports were published in 2004.

== Findings ==
The study showed that an A36-A46 link road (to the east of Bath) would significantly reduce HGV traffic in Bath. It was also shown to reduce traffic volumes in Trowbridge and Bradford on Avon. The proposed link road was costed at £40M.
