= John Maggs =

English painter (1819–1896)

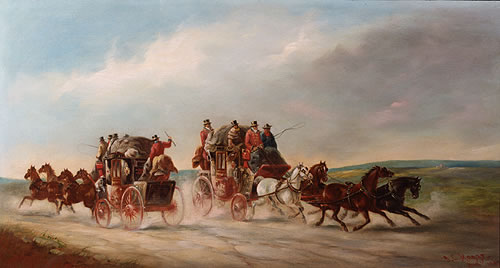
Brighton-London Mail

James Charles Maggs (17 September 1819 – 3 November 1896) was a painter best known for his coaching scenes. He has sometimes been referred to as John Maggs.

He was born and Baptized in London, England in 1819, his father being a furniture japanner from Bath. He painted a series of famous coaching inns, and also a series of 80 metropolitan inns, in which he exploited the picturesque and historical aspect of his subject, to which his talent was best suited. Other subjects he painted include Newmarket Races, Robbing the Mails, The News of Waterloo, The Market Place at Bath. The period he illustrated spans about two centuries; from the days before Hogarth, to the end of the reign of William IV. His work enjoyed great popularity at a time when there was much interest in such vivid reconstruction of the 'romantic past'.

James Maggs' father, also James, is recorded as an artist at Bath 1837–1841 and his uncle as a portrait painter 1846–1848. His daughter also assisted at his studio, known as the Bath Art Studio. Maggs lived in Bath his whole life, and died there on 3 November 1896, aged 77.
