= Bath Chilli Festival =

Cultural event in England

The Bath Chilli Festival is a chilli and music festival that takes place annually in the city of Bath.

== 2017 ==
The festival was held at the University of Bath on the weekend of the 15 and 16 July.

== 2015 ==
The 2015 event was held at the University of Bath campus on Saturday 26 September.

== 2014 ==
The 2014 event was held at the University of Bath on Saturday 27 September. The festival grew impressively from the previous year, with several thousand in attendance, including the Mayor of Bath who was there to hand out prizes in the awards ceremony.

- Music — Featured artists included Laz's Blues Band, The Counterpart, Jon Chouler, Amit Nathubhai, and the return of The Cadbury Sisters.
- Cookery Demo — Masterchef finalist Bini Ludlow entertained the audience with a 'Cooking on a Budget' cookery demonstration.
- Great Bath Curry Competition — Businesses from around the city were invited to go head to head in a Curry cook off. The winners were chosen by public vote and the GPT Smokehouse were declared winners in both hot and mild categories.
- Media — The event was covered by the Bath Chronicle.

== 2013 ==
The 2013 event was held at the University of Bath on the weekend of the 5 and 6 October.

- Music — Featured artists included Bite the Buffalo (who had appeared at the Glastonbury Festival 2013) and The Cadbury Sisters.
- Science — Dr Amit Nathubhai presented lectures on the subject of Chilli Science, with particular reference to the work of Späth and Darling who first synthesised capsaicin, and Wilbur Scoville who devised the Scoville Organoleptic test. Joy Michaud gave talks on Chilli 'Factoids' and Matt Simpson also presented talks on the history of chillies. Two chilli eating competitions took place, the first was hosted by Darth Naga and the second by The Clifton Chilli Club.
