= Thomas Guidott =

British physicist (1638–1706)

Thomas Guidott (September, 1638–1706), an English "doctor of physick" and writer, became one of the 17th century's most prolific physical scientists. He used the analytical techniques of his time to detail and document the properties of the hot mineral springs at Bath, Somerset, and touted the waters of Sadler's Wells.

== Early life ==
Guidott was born to Francis Guidott, in Lymington, Hampshire and attended Dorchester Free School before studying Chemistry, Physics and Medicine at Wadham College, Oxford.

== Bath, Somerset ==
In 1668, Guidott moved to Bath and set up an extensive medical practice there. In 1669, he published his first book on Bath, recording both the history of the city and some case studies of the curative properties of the hot spring mineral waters that rose in the city and which had since Roman times fed a spa complex there.

=== Bath's healing hot mineral springs ===
In 1676, Guidott published his famous work about the waters at Bath. This work brought the health-giving properties of Bath's waters to the attention of the aristocracy, among whom the town became a popular health resort.

== Works ==
- A Discourse of Bathe, and the Hot Waters There. Also, Some Enquiries into the nature of the Water of St. Vincent's Rock, near Bristol. London. 1676.
- A true and exact account of Sadlers Well, or, The new mineral-waters lately found out at Islington. London. 1698.
