= Mission Theatre =

Theatre in Bath, England

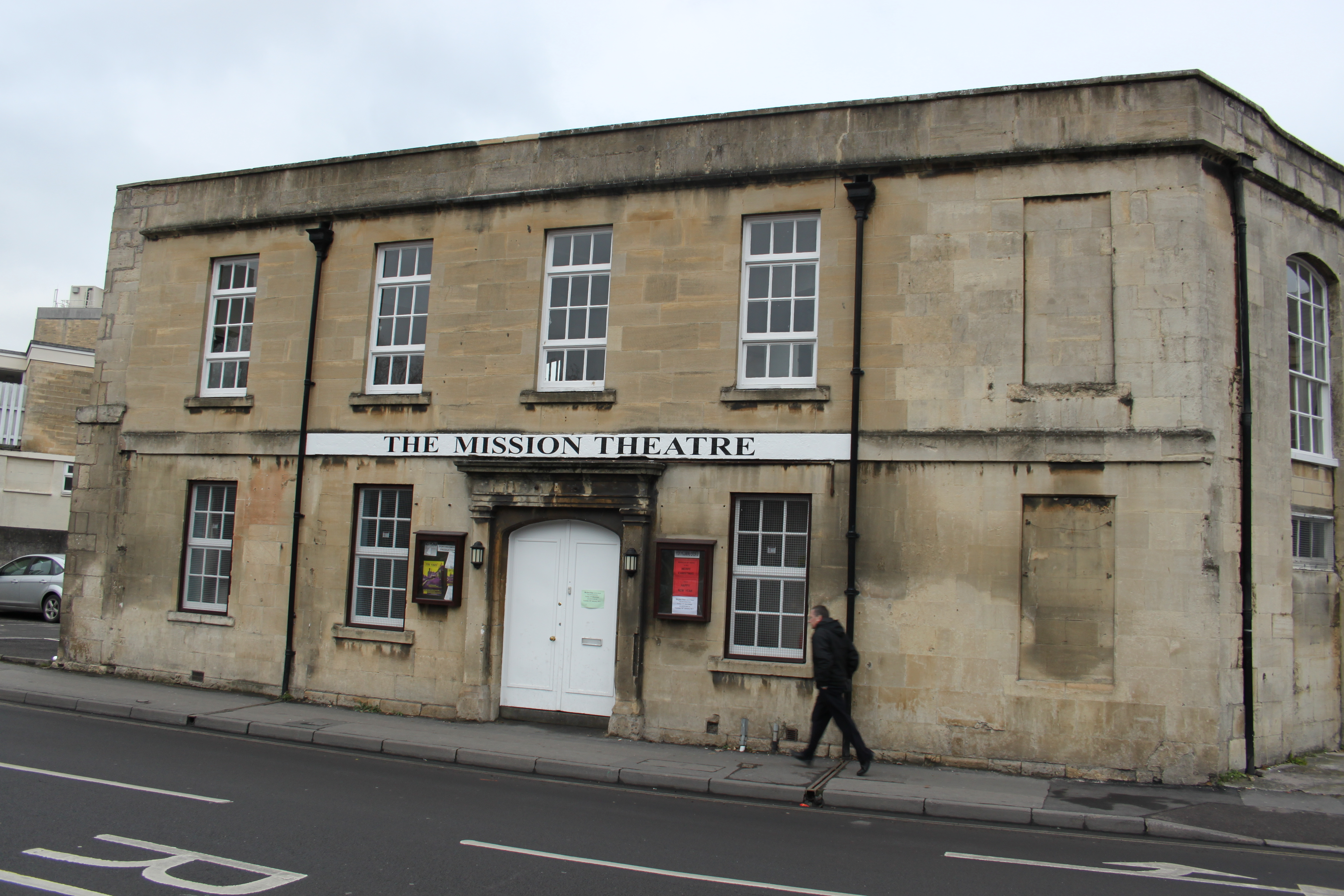
- Interactive map of Mission Theatre
- Address: 32 Corn Street; Bath; England
- Coordinates: 51.3807°N 2.3633°W
- Capacity: 100
- Designation: Listed Building Grade II

Website
- http://www.missiontheatre.co.uk

Mission Theatre is a theatre in Bath, England.

In 2004, Next Stage Theatre Company took possession of a grade II listed building originally built as a Congregational hall for various religious groups in 1797. During World War II the building was used by Air Raid Wardens. It was used by The People's Mission until 1998, when it was left derelict for a number of years before being sold to Next Stage Theatre Company in 2004, where building work began to convert it into a theatre.

It is now owned by the Bath and North East Somerset Council, which has granted a Community Asset Transfer to Next Stage Theatre Company to occupy and use the building as a 100-seat theatre, arts centre and multi-purpose facility for community use. Next Stage's Community Asset Transfer was guaranteed for a minimum of 99 years from 2021.

On the first floor there is a small 30-seat theatre (The Theatre Upstairs) and a bar/cafe that opens before performances in the theatre and provides drinks and snacks.
