= Bath chaps =

Cooked pork dish

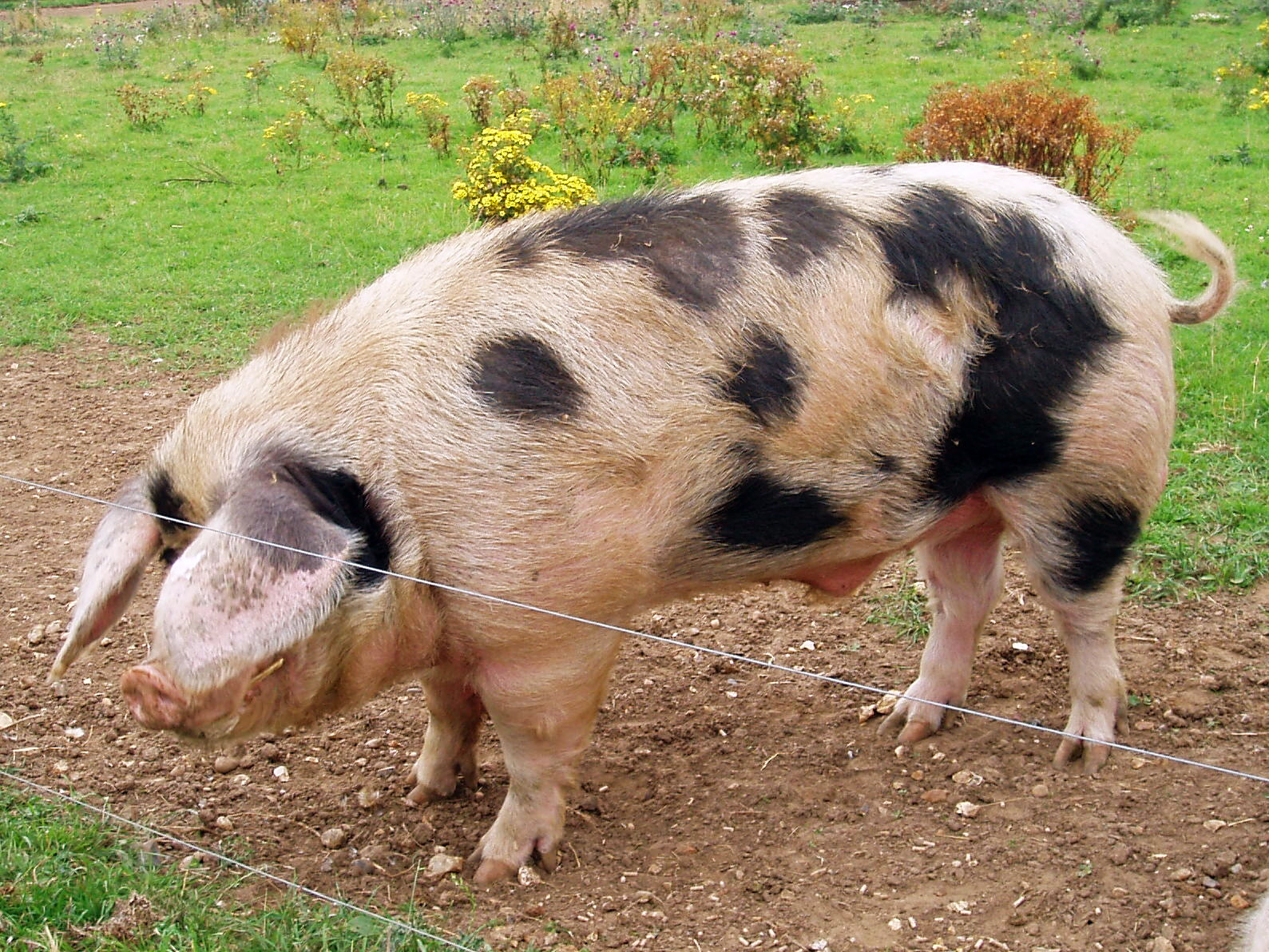
- A Gloucester Old Spot pig, from which Bath chaps are traditionally made
- Course: Main course
- Place of origin: United Kingdom
- Region or state: West Country
- Main ingredients: Pork jowl

Bath chaps are a traditional West Country meat dish, made from the lower pork jowl. They were originally made from Gloucestershire Old Spot pigs, until the breed became endangered. The meat is typically brined and then cooked, and is often served cold and sliced, similar to ham.
