= Hampton Row Halt railway station =

Former railway station in England

Hampton Row Halt

General information
- Location: Bathwick, Bath and North East Somerset; England
- Coordinates: 51.3906°N 2.3458°W
- Platforms: 2

Other information
- Status: Disused

History
- Pre-grouping: Great Western Railway

Key dates
- 1907: Station opened
- 1917: Station closed
Location

Hampton Row Halt railway station is a former railway station in Bath, Somerset, England.

== Description ==
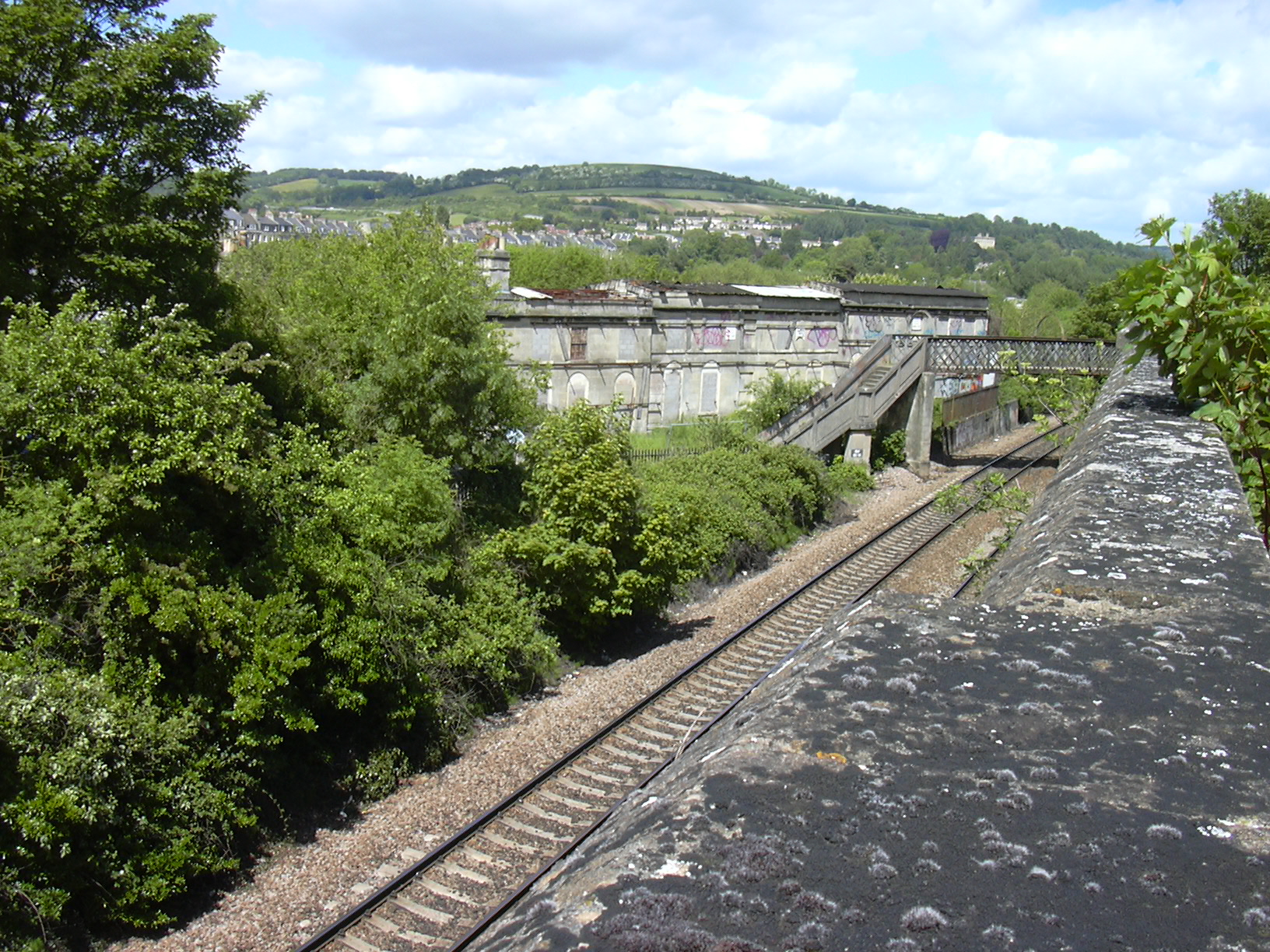
Hampton Row station from Kennet and Avon Canal

The station was built as a halt for the eastern suburbs of Bath, and named after the street that leads eastwards from Sydney Gardens. It opened in 1907 for Great Western Railway stopping train services from Bristol, Swindon and Westbury, Wiltshire.

The station had two platforms, linked by an iron foot bridge which still exists. Its site is on the south side of the River Avon, and to the north of the Kennet and Avon Canal which had to be diverted to the south when the railway was built.

== Accidents and incidents ==
On 15 August 1876 a freight train was derailed at Hampton Row after a bale of cotton fell off a wagon and derailed the one behind it.

== Closure ==
The station was open for only a short period, as at the same time trams and motor transport were becoming more commonplace. As a street, Hampton Row leads only on to the canal towpath, which limited the station's accessibility.

The station was closed on 25 April 1917 as an economy measure during the First World War, as was Twerton station, which served the west of the city. Neither station reopened when peace came.

== Present day ==
The station has been entirely dismantled, leaving a vacant space between the railway lines and the road or canal embankment. A section of rail forms a barrier between a turning/parking area at the end of Hampton Row and railway property. Numbers 9-14 Hampton Row became derelict after Buchanan's Plan for Bath was released in the 1960s, with a new road intended to pass through the site. The houses were compulsorily purchased, but the plan never came to fruition. In the recent years, the houses have now been developed and stand as liveable homes.

Preceding station	Historical railways	Following station
Bath Spa; Line and station open	Great Western Railway; Great Western Main Line	Bathampton; Line open, station closed
