= Saltford railway station =

Closed railway station in Somerset, England

Saltford
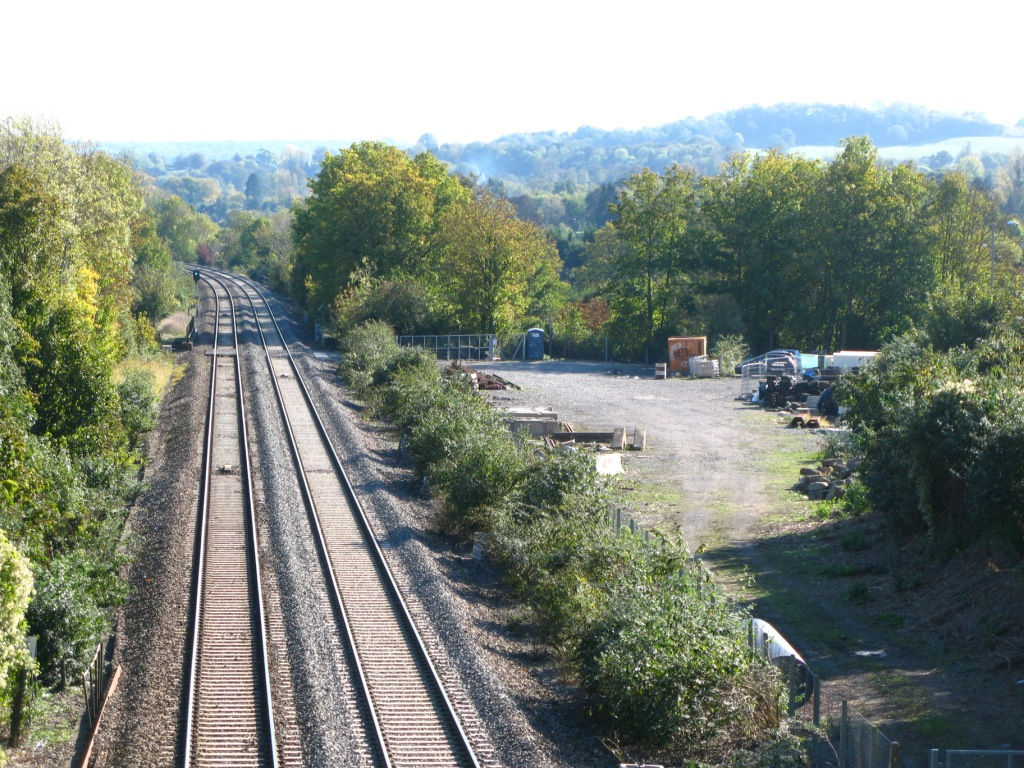
- Looking east over the station site in 2011

General information
- Location: Saltford, District of Bath and North East Somerset; England
- Coordinates: 51.3997°N 2.4501°W
- Platforms: 2

Other information
- Status: Disused

History
- Original company: Great Western Railway
- Pre-grouping: Great Western Railway
- Post-grouping: Great Western Railway

Key dates
- 16 December 1840: Opened
- c. August 1873: Rebuilt
- 10 September 1959: Closed to goods
- 5 January 1970: Closed entirely
Location

Saltford railway station was a small station on the Great Western Main Line between Bath and Bristol in use between 1840 and 1970. It served the village of Saltford, Somerset. A local group is campaigning to have the station reopened.

== History ==
The station was opened on 16 December 1840, four months after the Great Western Railway line opened between Bath and Bristol. The original timber building was destroyed by fire in August 1873; its replacement was constructed from stone. A rival station had opened in 1869 at Kelston on the nearby Mangotsfield and Bath Branch Line of the Midland Railway. The bridge carrying that line across the river Avon also carried a footpath from Saltford.

Goods traffic was withdrawn from Saltford on 10 September 1959, however passenger services continued until 5 January 1970 when the station was closed.

Proposals to reinstate Saltford station have not so far succeeded. Access to the old site from the A4 is awkward, but there are few other suitable sites in the village. The Saltford Environment Group is campaigning for the reopening of Saltford station. They hope to have the station reopened when the Great Western Main Line is electrified, including between Bath and Bristol Temple Meads.

Preceding station	Historical railways	Following station
Keynsham	Great Western Railway; Great Western Main Line	Twerton-on-Avon

== Description ==
The station was sited at the eastern end of the village at the foot of Saltford Hill, which is the present day A4 road between Bath and Bristol. The main building was on the down platform and there was also a small siding for goods. After the station closed the buildings and platforms were demolished. Much of the main line through Saltford runs in a deep cutting or in tunnel.
