= Keynsham railway station =

Railway station in Somerset, England

Keynsham
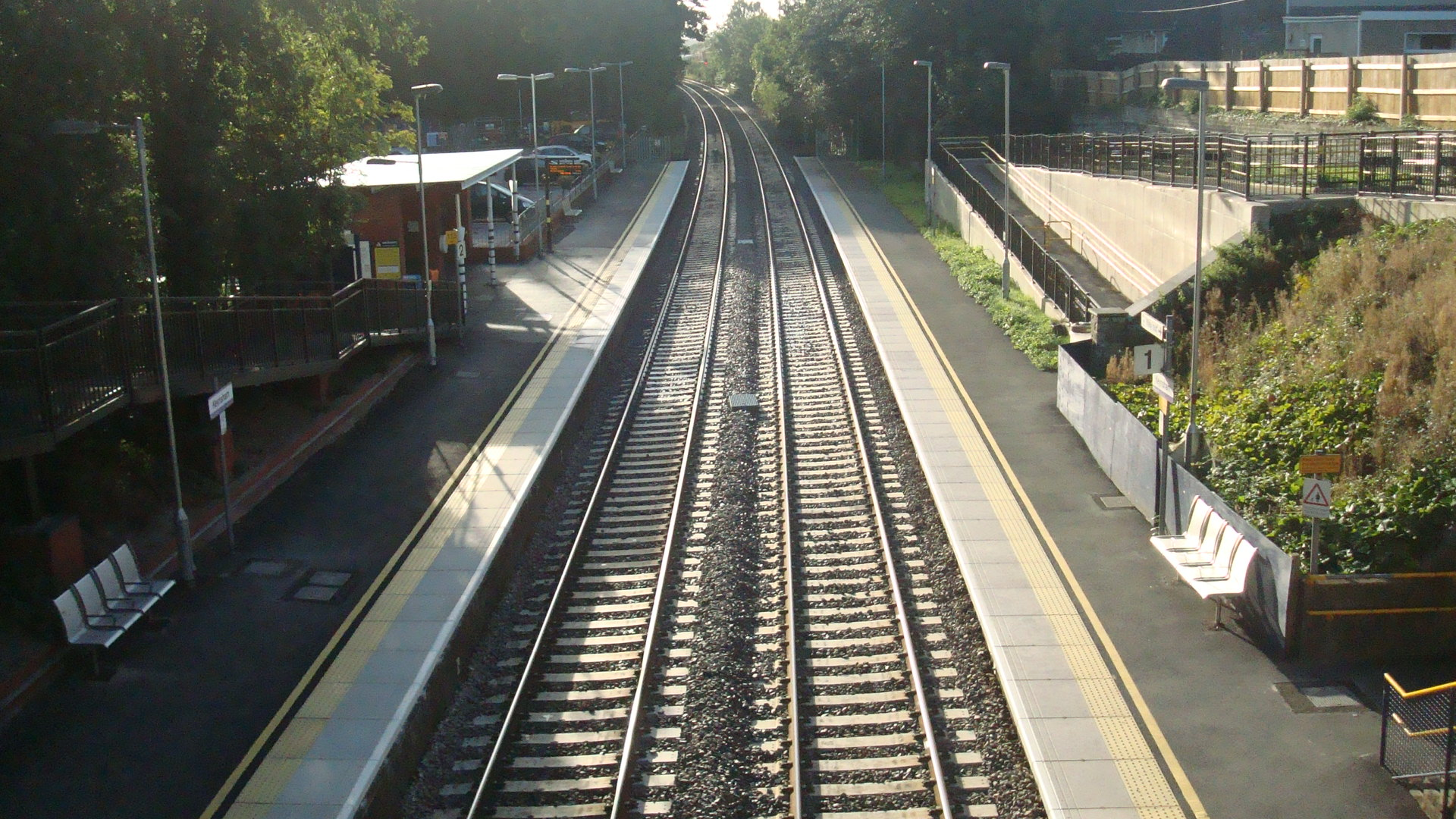
- Looking towards Bath from the station footbridge in September 2016.

General information
- Location: Keynsham, Bath and North East Somerset; England
- Coordinates: 51.4180°N 2.4954°W
- Grid reference: ST655689
- Manager: Great Western Railway
- Platforms: 2

Other information
- Station code: KYN
- Classification: DfT category F1

History
- Original company: Great Western Railway

Key dates
- 31 August 1840: Opened as Keynsham
- 1 February 1925: Renamed Keynsham and Somerdale
- 6 May 1974: Renamed Keynsham

Passengers
- 2021/22: ▲0.298 million
- 2022/23: ▲0.419 million
- 2023/24: ▲0.511 million
- 2024/25: ▲0.566 million
- 2025/26: ▲0.628 million
Location
Notes
- Passenger statistics from the Office of Rail and Road

Keynsham railway station is on the Great Western Main Line in South West England, serving the town of Keynsham, Somerset. It is 113 miles 63 chains (183.1 km) down the line from London Paddington and is situated between Oldfield Park and Bristol Temple Meads stations.

It is managed by Great Western Railway, who operate all services at this station.

== History ==
The station was opened on 31 August 1840 with the completion of the Great Western Railway line between Bristol and Bath. It was renamed Keynsham and Somerdale on 1 February 1925 with the opening of the Fry's chocolate factory at Somerdale, which had its own siding. The station was rebuilt in 1931 to accommodate longer trains bringing in workers who had transferred from a factory in Bristol belonging to the company.

Between 1841 and 1851 it had the possibly unique distinction, for a railway station, of featuring a Roman Orpheus mosaic set into a floor. This had been found at Newton St Loe, and is now in Bristol City Museum and Art Gallery.

Keynsham is the nearest station to the village of Saltford, which until 1970 had its own station.

The station's name reverted to Keynsham on 6 May 1974. By this time many workers had relocated to Keynsham, or commuted by car. The factory had its own rail system which was connected to the mainline. The connection to Fry's chocolate factory was taken out of use on 26–27 July 1980. The trackbed of this can still be seen opposite the entrance to the station car park, which is now a public walking route into the housing estate on what was the Somerdale sports fields.

The station was rebuilt in 1985 as a joint project between British Rail and Avon County Council. The rebuilding provided a new brick built shelter on platform 2, a new footbridge and the enlargement of the car park. Further construction work began in mid-2009. In 2011 a campaign group was formed to gain improved access for the disabled at the station. Recently a new disabled access ramp was built which provides wheelchair access between the footbridge and Platform 1. In addition to this, dot matrix display boards have been put up on both platforms. These displays are accompanied by audio announcements.

Preceding station	Historical railways	Following station
St Anne's Park	Great Western Railway; Great Western Main Line	Saltford

== Accidents and incidents ==
- On 6 march 1842, an elderly passenger was hit by a locomotive, killed immeadiatly. this prompted the construction of the footbridge to connect platforms.
- On 18 March 1849, a passenger train became divided approaching Keynsham. The rear portion then ran into the front portion when the latter stopped at the station. One person was injured.
- On 20 January 1853 a luggage train was derailed near Keynsham due to an axle failure on one of the carriages.
- On 7 June 1865, a passenger train ran into the rear of another near Keynsham. An empty stock train ran into the wreckage. At least three people were injured.

== Services ==
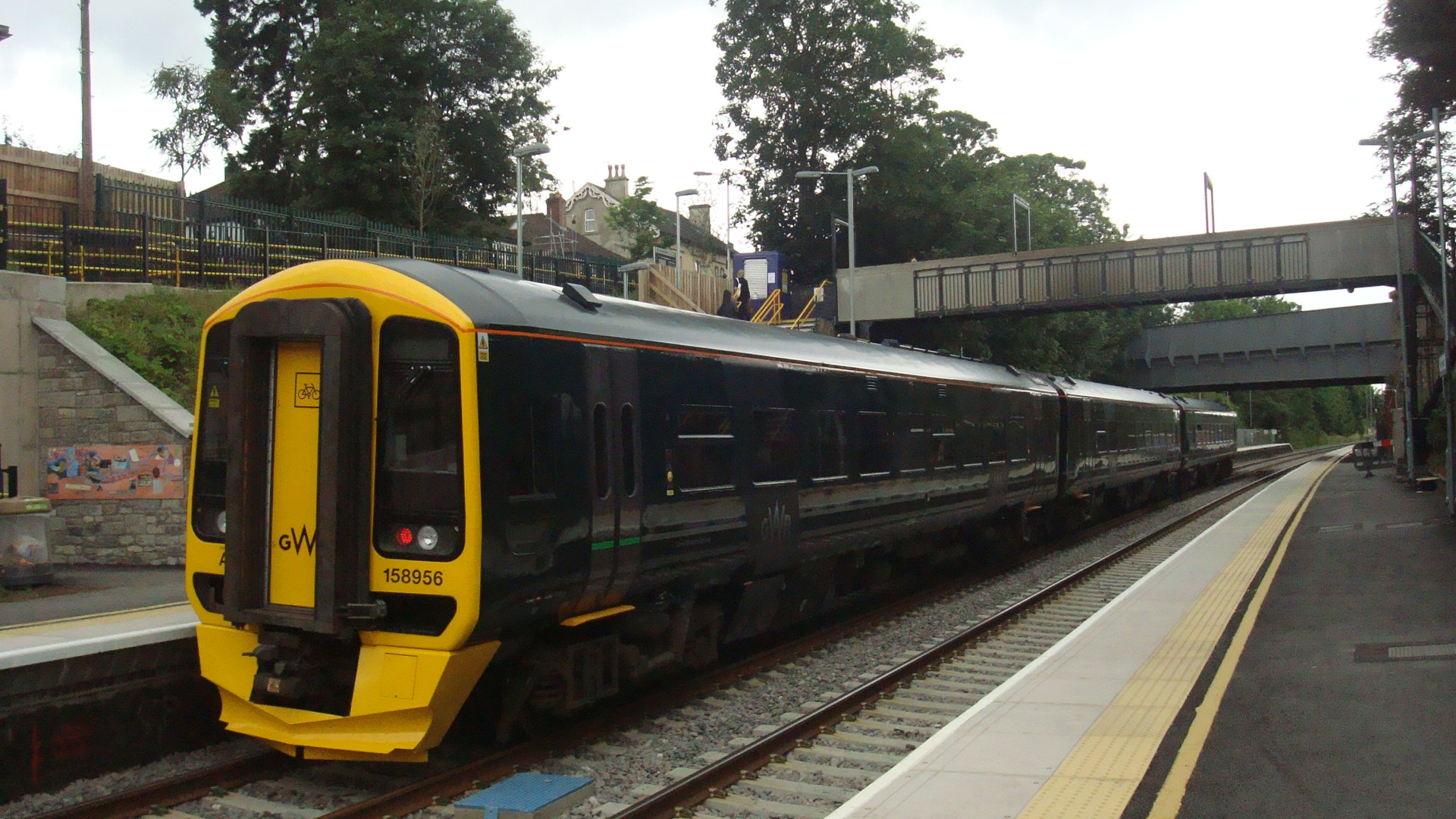
A Class 158 at Keynsham

Passenger services are operated by Great Western Railway.

Keynsham Station has at least an hourly service in each direction between Monday and Saturday, with roughly a 2 hourly service on Sunday. Direct destinations include: Brighton; Southampton Central; Weymouth; Cardiff; Bath Spa; Gloucester; and Bristol Temple Meads. The majority of its services are a combination of 2 hourly Weymouth trains and 2 hourly Southampton trains eastbound and an hourly service to Bristol and Gloucester in the other direction. On summer Saturdays an extra train is run between Bristol Temple Meads and Weymouth formed of either a Sprinter or a Class 166 Turbo, calling at Keynsham at 09:14, this train does not call at Freshford, Avoncliff, Bruton, Thornford, Yetminster, Chetnole or Upwey. There is one direct service from London Paddington on Monday to Friday that calls at Keynsham at 08:06. A return service to London was introduced in summer 2020, calling at Keynsham at 17:36. Passengers wishing to travel to London Paddington during the off peak hours should change at Bath Spa or Bristol Temple Meads. The typical journey times are approximately 7 minutes to Bristol and 10 minutes to Bath.

It is common to see a range of different train classes. These include Class 158s, Class 165s, Class 166s and Class 800s. Keynsham also used to be a stop on West Coast Railways' Weymouth Seaside Express on Summer Sundays from July to September, although this train has not run since the railway upgrade works east of Bath in August 2015.

Keynsham is also a stop on a Parliamentary train that runs on weekdays to Filton Abbey Wood from Bath Spa, via Bristol West Curve. It does not call at Bristol Temple Meads.

Until the December 2021 timetable change, Keynsham was a stop on South Western Railway's London Waterloo to Bristol services. These trains detached from the rear of Waterloo to Exeter services at Salisbury.

Preceding station	National Rail	Following station
Bristol Temple Meads	Great Western Railway; Great Malvern/Gloucester - Westbury/South Coast	Oldfield Park

== Electrification ==
As part of the electrification of the Great Western Main Line, the line through Keynsham closed for 1 week in April 2016 so that Network Rail could carry out preparation work for the installation of the overhead wires. This involved the lowering of the track under the road bridge and the replacement of the canopy on platform 1. Also the brick shelter on the Bath (up) platform was enlarged. The canopy on Platform 2 was removed between 14 and 18 March 2016.

== Bus links ==
The following bus service stops just outside the station on Station Road:

- 17 Keynsham to Bristol city centre via Hanham and Southmead Hospital

This service is operated by First West of England.
