= Westmoreland station =

Westmoreland station may refer to:

- Westmoreland station (DART), a light rail station in Dallas, Texas
- Westmoreland Road goods yard, a GWR goods station in Bath, England
- Westmoreland station (SEPTA), a station on the Chestnut Hill West Line in Philadelphia, Pennsylvania
