= Bathampton railway station =

Disused railway station in Bathampton, Somerset

Bathampton
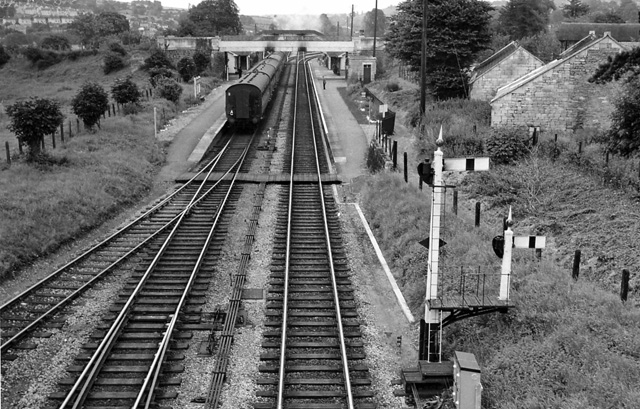
- The station in 1963, looking east

General information
- Location: Bathampton, District of Bath and North East Somerset; England
- Coordinates: 51.3983°N 2.3208°W
- Grid reference: ST777666
- Platforms: 2

Other information
- Status: Disused

History
- Original company: Great Western Railway
- Pre-grouping: Great Western Railway
- Post-grouping: Great Western Railway

Key dates
- 2 February 1857: Opened
- 10 June 1963: Closed to goods
- 3 October 1966: Closed
Location

Bathampton railway station is a former railway station in Bath, England, serving the community of Bathampton. The station opened on 2 February 1857 and closed on 3 October 1966. Very little remains, as the station site was replaced with improved trackwork for a nearby junction. The only significant remains are the gateposts at the head of the approach road.

== History ==
The main line of the Great Western Railway (GWR) opened in stages, and was completed on 30 June 1841 with the opening of the stretch between Chippenham and Bath; there were initially two intermediate stations, at Corsham and at Box. The Wilts, Somerset and Weymouth Railway (WS&WR) opened between Thingley Junction (west of Chippenham) and Westbury on 5 September 1848; it was absorbed by the GWR on 14 March 1850. The Act of Parliament authorising the WS&WR had stipulated that it should also build a branch line connecting its main line to Bath, in order to communicate with Bristol, but owing to difficulty in obtaining finance, this was not proceeded with. A lawsuit was successfully brought against the GWR in 1853, and on 31 July 1854, the GWR obtained a fresh Act of Parliament granting an extension of time for the completion of the branch, and this was opened on 2 February 1857 from Bradford Junction, a triangular junction at Trowbridge on the former WS&WR line, to a new station at Bathampton on the GWR main line. It had been planned that this station would be the interchange point for trains on the branch to Bradford-on-Avon, but once the Bradford-on-Avon service commenced, it normally ran through to Bath. Bathampton station was mainly used by the people who lived in eastern Bath.

The station had two platforms, used by both main line and branch trains; the junction of the two routes was at the eastern end of the station. The main and branch lines had been built to the broad gauge; during June 1874, the main line from the junction to the west was altered to mixed gauge, and the Bradford-on-Avon branch was converted to standard gauge; the main line from the junction to the east was altered to mixed gauge in March 1875; and the main line was altered from mixed gauge to standard gauge in May 1892. The main line was always double track, but the branch, which had been built as single-track, was doubled in May 1885. The station had several sidings, some of which served a timber works. There were two signal boxes, Bathampton and Bathampton West, which were replaced by a single signal box on 21 September 1956.

== Proposed reopening ==
The reopening of Bathampton station was initially proposed as part of the MetroWest project for local rail services in the West of England. A study into its reopening was undertaken in 2015, which concluded a cost of between £3 million and £11 million.

== Accidents and incidents ==
- On 11 June 1875, a passenger train was derailed at Bathampton Junction. One person was killed and six were injured, three seriously.
- On 2 July 1876, a freight train was derailed at Bathampton Junction.

Preceding station	Historical railways	Following station
Hampton Row Halt; Line open, station closed	Great Western Railway; Great Western Main Line	Bathford Halt; Line open, station closed
Hampton Row Halt; Line open, station closed	Great Western Railway; Wessex Main Line / Heart of Wessex Line	Limpley Stoke; Line open, station closed
