= Slough rail accident =

Collision at Slough, England in 1900

Coordinates: 51.51238°N 0.59358°W

Details
- Date: 16 June 1900; 13:41
- Location: Slough railway station
- Country: England
- Line: Great Western Main Line
- Operator: Great Western Railway
- Cause: Signal passed at danger

Statistics
- Trains: 2
- Deaths: 5
- Injured: 90 minor injuries and 35 serious injuries

The Slough rail accident happened on 16 June 1900 at Slough railway station on the Great Western Main Line when an express train from London Paddington to Falmouth Docks ran through two sets of signals at danger, and collided with a local train heading for Windsor & Eton Central. Five passengers were killed; 35 were seriously injured, and 90 complained of shock or minor injuries

Significant consequences of the accident were the adoption of improved vacuum braking systems on locomotives and passenger rolling stock, and the introduction of Automatic Train Control (ATC) in 1908.

== The trains ==
The local train pulled by a 'four-coupled bogie passenger engine' (i.e. a 4-4-0 tender engine) should have left London Paddington at 13:05. Due to the large crowds expected to travel to Windsor Racecourse it had been augmented by two extra coaches but an additional eighth coach was added at Paddington, delaying departure until 13:28. Its only stop before Windsor was Slough, and when it arrived at the down main platform at 13:37 it was eight minutes late. It was held there for longer than usual; tickets for Windsor trains had to be collected at Slough and there were many more passengers than normal. Signals were set to danger behind it.

Meanwhile, behind the local train, the 13:15 express from Paddington to Falmouth Docks was running a couple of minutes late. It comprised GWR 3031 Class engine No. 3015 Kennet pulling ten coaches and was not booked to stop at Slough; its first stop was to be at Reading. The lines through Slough are straight and level and it was travelling at full speed – between 50 and 60 mph (80 and 97 km/h) – when it approached Slough.

== Block working ==
Block working was in force on the line; one train was allowed to occupy each section of track. The section including the station was controlled by Slough East signal box; the previous section was controlled by Dolphin signal box. Both sets of signals were set at danger behind the Windsor train. A "warning arrangement" allows Slough East to accept a train from Dolphin by giving the "Section clear but station blocked" signal to Dolphin. The latter would then stop the train at his home signal and verbally warn the driver that the line through the station is blocked. The driver is then allowed to proceed.

== Collision ==
The driver of the 13:15 Falmouth express passed Dolphin box at full speed, ignoring the distant and home signals. The Dolphin signalman immediately tried to telephone Slough East but was unable to get a reply. The Slough East signalman said he had not heard the telephone; the first he knew of the problem was when he heard the 13:15 approaching, much sooner than he had expected. He waved a red flag from the window and shouted to the platform to get the passengers off the Windsor train.

The subsequent investigation found that Henry Woodman, the driver of the express had failed to see the Dolphin signals. He also missed the Slough East distant signal. It was the fireman who finally noticed the Slough East home signal was at danger and applied the brakes. The train managed to slow to between 25 and 30 mph when it struck the rear of the standing train, driving it forwards 15 yards. The two rear carriages were "completely destroyed", "the last but one being thrown up to the roof of the station and falling back on to the engine of the second train". Two compartments of the next carriage were "completely smashed".

Five passengers were killed; 35 were seriously injured, and 90 complained of shock or minor injuries. The death toll would have been far higher had most of the 450 passengers on board not managed to jump clear in response to the shouted warnings. In addition the brakes of the standing train had been released in preparation for its imminent departure, so the shock of the collision was lessened.

== Investigation ==
In the subsequent enquiry Woodman could offer no explanation for his inattention: "I cannot say in what position the Dolphin signals were. I did not see them. I am at a loss to say how it was that I failed to do so", "I cannot recollect passing Dolphin signal-box. I do not remember seeing the distant signal for Slough East box", "I was in my usual health, I did not feel the least sleepy. I had nothing particular to occupy my thoughts that I am aware of", "I can give no explanation other than that I seem to have lost myself".

The enquiry ruled that a primary cause of the accident was the poor physical condition of the driver, due to his age (59 years) and fatigue; he had started duty at 05:00 that morning. It recommended that drivers be medically examined at age 55 (rather than 60) and each succeeding year thereafter.

The fireman and guard of the express were also criticised. To the fireman's credit he did act decisively when he spotted the Slough East home signal at danger; but it was one of his duties to "carefully observe all signals" which he did not do earlier. The guard claimed that he was too busy attending to luggage and mailbags to look out for signals; his priorities were supported by the officers of the company but the enquiry pointed out that according to the regulations the "safe working of the train" should have been his first consideration.

Inquests held at Slough and Paddington absolved the driver of blame, but the jury at Windsor found him culpably negligent; he was charged with manslaughter and sent for trial at Reading assizes where the jury verdict of not guilty was met with cheers from the public gallery.

== Automatic Train Control ==
The enquiry concluded with a response to press suggestions that "some mechanical contrivance working in conjunction with the semaphore signals should be adopted, to render it impossible for a driver to pass a danger signal without becoming aware of the fact". It warned that the introduction of such a system would lead drivers to rely on it, so paying less heed to the signals themselves. At the time of the accident, several such systems were under consideration by railway companies but had "not yet emerged from the experimental stage".

As a result of this accident the Great Western Railway worked to introduce by 1908 a system of Automatic Train Control in which a horn was sounded on the footplate when a Distant signal was passed at caution. If the driver did not acknowledge the warning then the brakes were automatically applied.

== Braking systems ==
As a direct result of the accident, the prototype Saint class locomotive no. 100 – the first of the GWR's many successful 4-6-0 designs – was fitted with vacuum brakes on all wheels of the locomotive and tender, rather than just the locomotive's steam brake. While the steam brake on a locomotive was very powerful, it took time to build up pressure on the initial application when the metal surfaces were cold; on a second application it was far more rapid, but this would not occur in an emergency.

The GWR had prided itself on their version of the vacuum brake, considering it superior to any other than in use. However, the findings of the accident enquiry dented this pride and the company immediately started experiments into improved vacuum braking systems. In 1903 a revised brake cylinder was introduced, that included 'accelerating valves' allowing air directly into the cylinder in an emergency application.
