= Oldfield Park railway station =

Railway station in Somerset, England

Oldfield Park
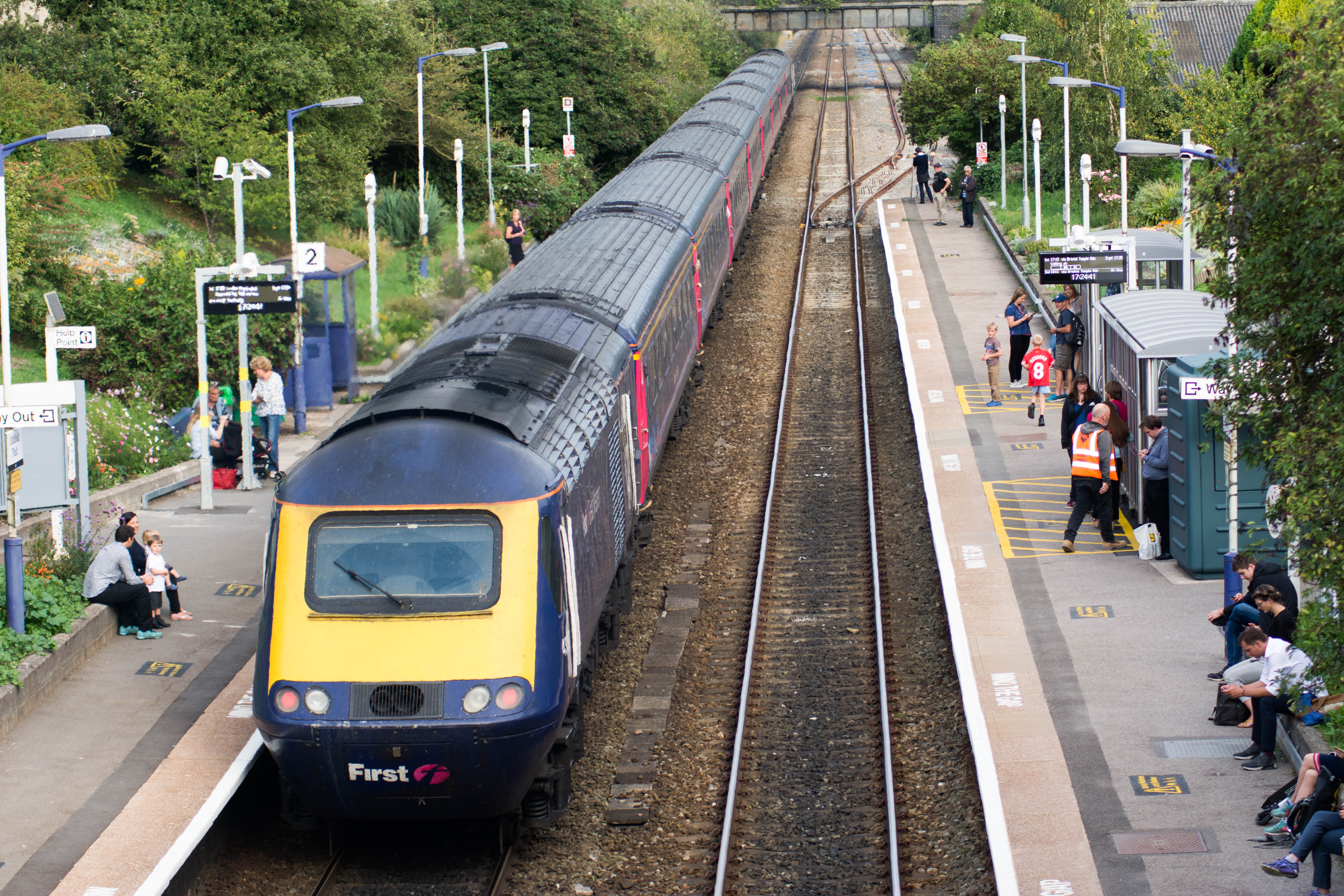

General information
- Location: Bath, Bath and North East Somerset; England
- Coordinates: 51.3792°N 2.3807°W
- Grid reference: ST736645
- Manager: Great Western Railway
- Platforms: 2

Other information
- Station code: OLF
- Classification: DfT category F2

History
- Original company: Great Western Railway

Key dates
- 1929: Opened

Passengers
- 2021/22: ▲0.239 million
- 2022/23: ▲0.298 million
- 2023/24: ▲0.344 million
- 2024/25: ▲0.386 million
- 2025/26: ▲0.420 million
Location
Notes
- Passenger statistics from the Office of Rail and Road

Oldfield Park railway station is on the Great Western Main Line in South West England, serving the mainly residential areas of southern Bath, Somerset. It is 107 miles 72 chains (173.6 km) down the line from London Paddington and is situated between Bath Spa and Keynsham.

It is managed by Great Western Railway, which also operate all of the trains that call. The station is located at the junction of Brook Road and Moorland Road; the Brook Road bridge links the two platforms.

The station opened in 1929, however, the line through the site has been open since 1840.

== History ==
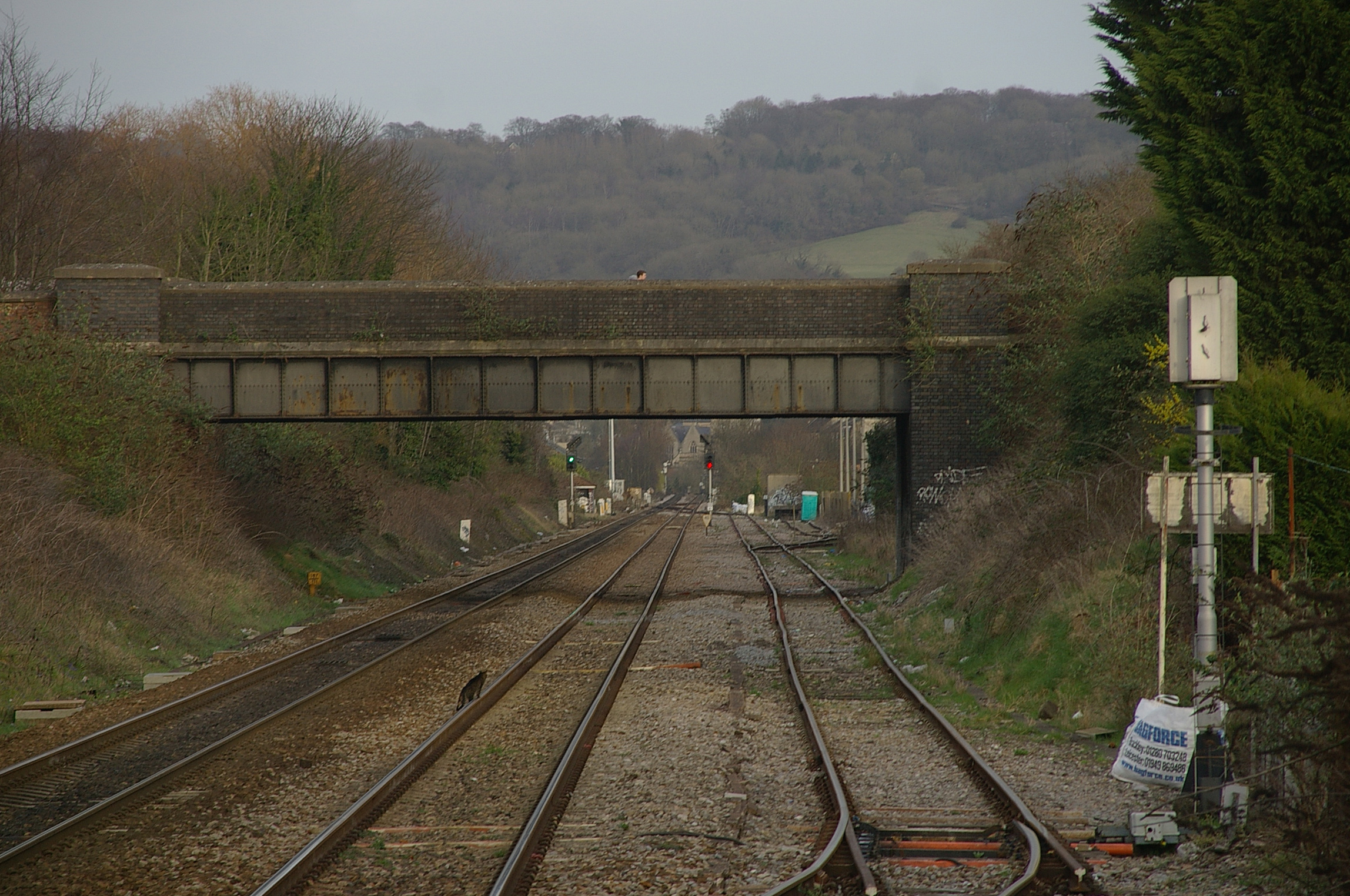
Brougham Hayes bridge, looking east to Westmoreland goods yard and Bath

Oldfield Park was the third station to be constructed in Bath on the G.W.R. line. It is the only station whose platforms are below the surrounding road levels, all the rest of Bath's G.W.R. stations are elevated. The railway line divides Bath's road systems into two distinct areas.

Many new road bridges were necessary to overcome the difficulty posed to local goods traffic by this new railway. The station is located between two such road bridges, one to the east is called Brougham Hayes bridge. It was originally built on the Tudor arch style of local stone. It was later demolished and replaced with a widened steel and stone structure. This occurred in the early 20th century when an extra line to a goods yard was laid to the end of the westbound platform. Brook Road bridge adjoins the station a short distance to the west.

The majority of Brunel's design for Bath was raised up on a system of earth embankments and stone arches. His objective in all his designs were to maintain his "billiard table" design philosophy. The main obstacle was a skew bridge crossing of the River Avon to link with the main Bath Spa station in the centre of the city. At the approach to the Oldfield Park section a cutting was necessary to maintain the desired level. It was into these cutting embankments that the two platforms were later accommodated.

To some extent Oldfield Park replaced an earlier station at Twerton, three-quarters of a mile to the west, which had closed, ostensibly temporarily, in the First World War and which had been badly affected by competing bus and tram services. The Twerton station never reopened.

The platforms were designed solely to enable passenger access to the carriages. The limited road and platform access made the handling of bulky goods very difficult. To the east of the westbound platform a single section of line was added from the Westmoreland goods yard in Lower Oldfield Park. This area of ground on the same level as Brunel's railway line was used as a stone yard and marshalling yard for goods wagons. It formed the only G.W.R. terminal in Bath with the necessary access to be able to handle heavy goods.

There was originally a full-time station master and ticket office. The 1929 ticket office was constructed of timber on tall wooden piles attached to both the Brook Road bridge and the ground below. It was located at the Moorland Road side of the bridge at road level. This has now been replaced by a portacabin styled ticket office on the westbound platform and a ticket dispensing machine. The ticket office is staffed on weekdays during the morning peak times. The station is also part of the Penalty Fares area.

Legislation was passed that ensured disabled users had easy access to public areas, the current long access ramp evolved to replace the earlier wooden steps. This new much extended ramp now leads passengers down to the replacement ticket office. Access to the eastbound platform is via a sloping path leading from the top of Brook Road, and further eastwards a set of steps lead down from Stuart Place.

=== Community support ===
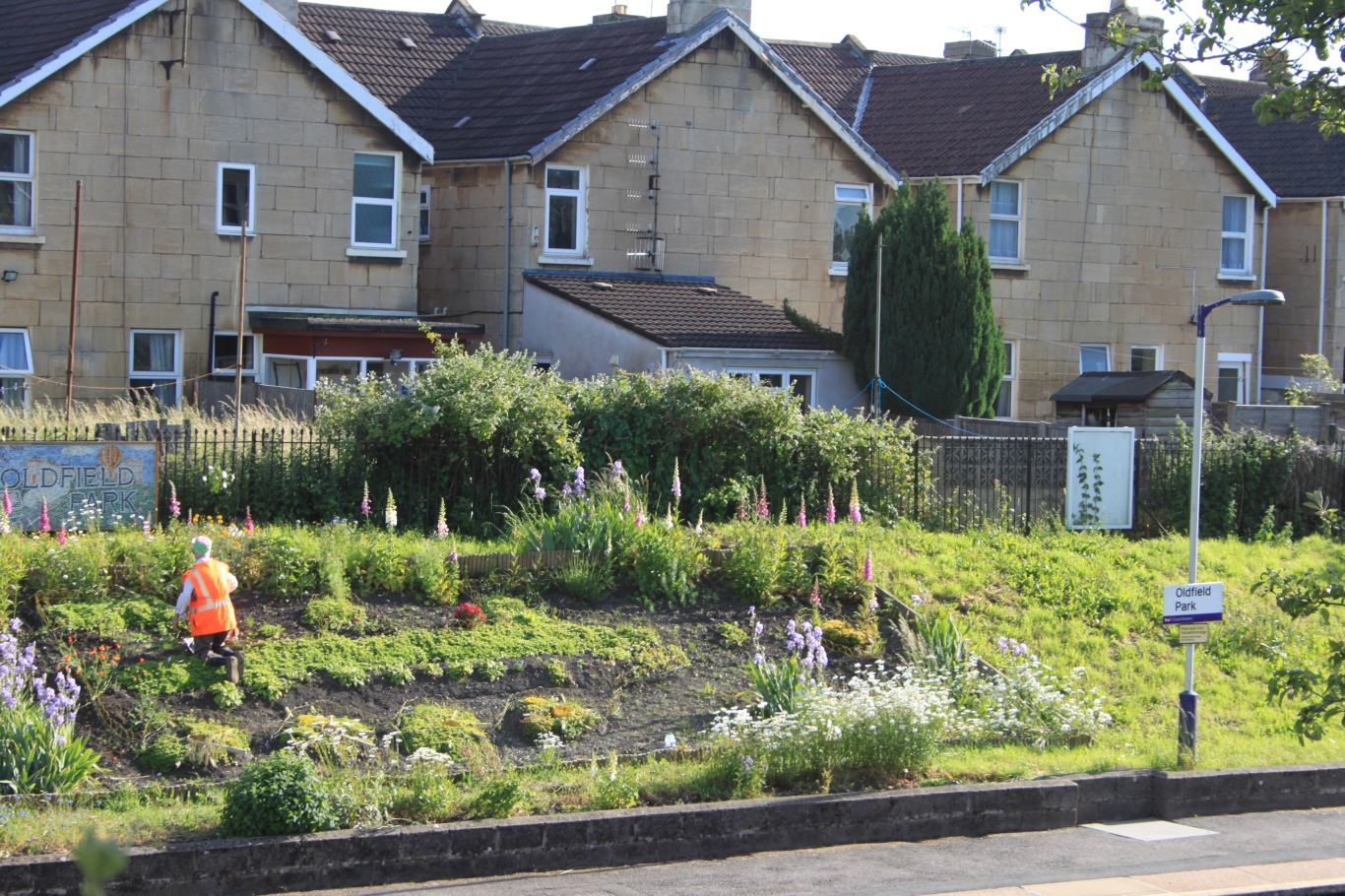
A community volunteer tending the station garden

Since 2006 there have been a number of local schemes to improve the appearance and the environment surrounding the station. These have included some landscaping and the planting of shrubs and flowers. In 2010 there were a team of 12 full-time volunteers, and local school children are involved with the project. The number of passengers using the station is now on the increase. This is due in part to the pressure from both the local people and their elected representatives in local government upon First Great Western to improve services.

== Services ==
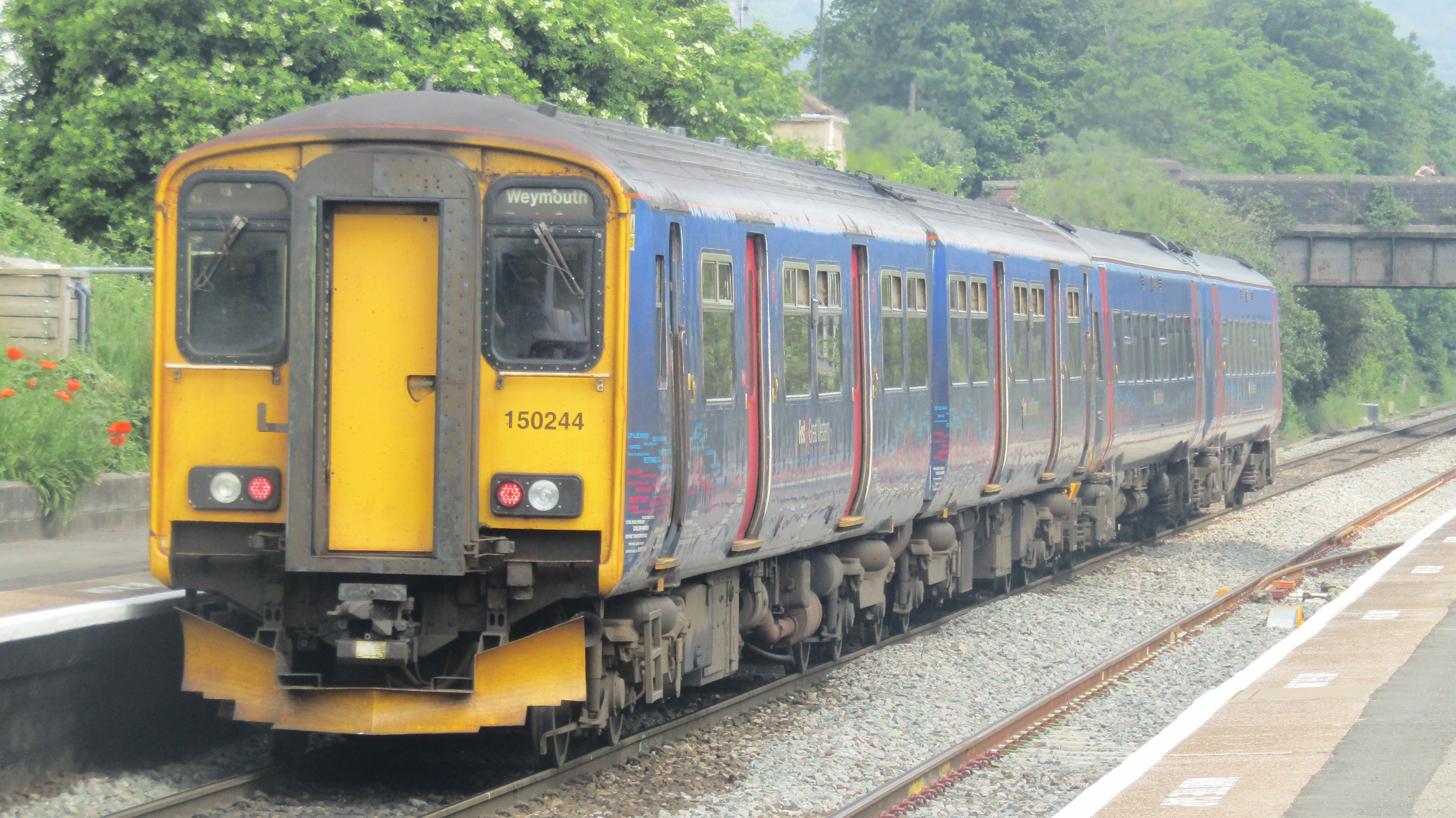
A service to Weymouth

Passenger services are operated by Great Western Railway. There is a service of two trains per hour, consisting of one train per hour between Bristol Temple Meads and Salisbury, and 1 train per hour between Gloucester and Westbury, with one train per two hours extending to Weymouth. At peak times some trains between Cardiff Central and Portsmouth Harbour call. For services towards London Paddington passengers must change at Bath Spa.

On Sundays there is one train per two hours between Cardiff Central and Portsmouth Harbour, and one train per two hours between Bristol Temple Meads and Westbury

There is a ticket machine at the station where passengers can collect pre-booked tickets or buy them on the day. There is also a small ticket office where you can buy tickets and ask questions which is open during common commuter periods.

Until the December 2021 timetable change, Oldfield Park was a stop on South Western Railway's London Waterloo to Bristol services. These trains detached from the rear of Waterloo to Exeter services at Salisbury.

In the May 2023 timetable change, as part of the MetroWest scheme, the service frequency was upgraded to the current two trains per hour, from the previous one train per hour the station had seen.

Preceding station	National Rail	Following station
Keynsham	Great Western Railway; Great Malvern/Gloucester - Westbury/South Coast	Bath Spa
	Historical railways	
Twerton-on-Avon; Line open, station closed	Great Western Railway; Great Western Main Line	Bath Spa; Line and station open
