= Twerton-on-Avon railway station =

Former railway station in England

Coordinates: 51.3803°N 2.3908°W

Twerton-on-Avon
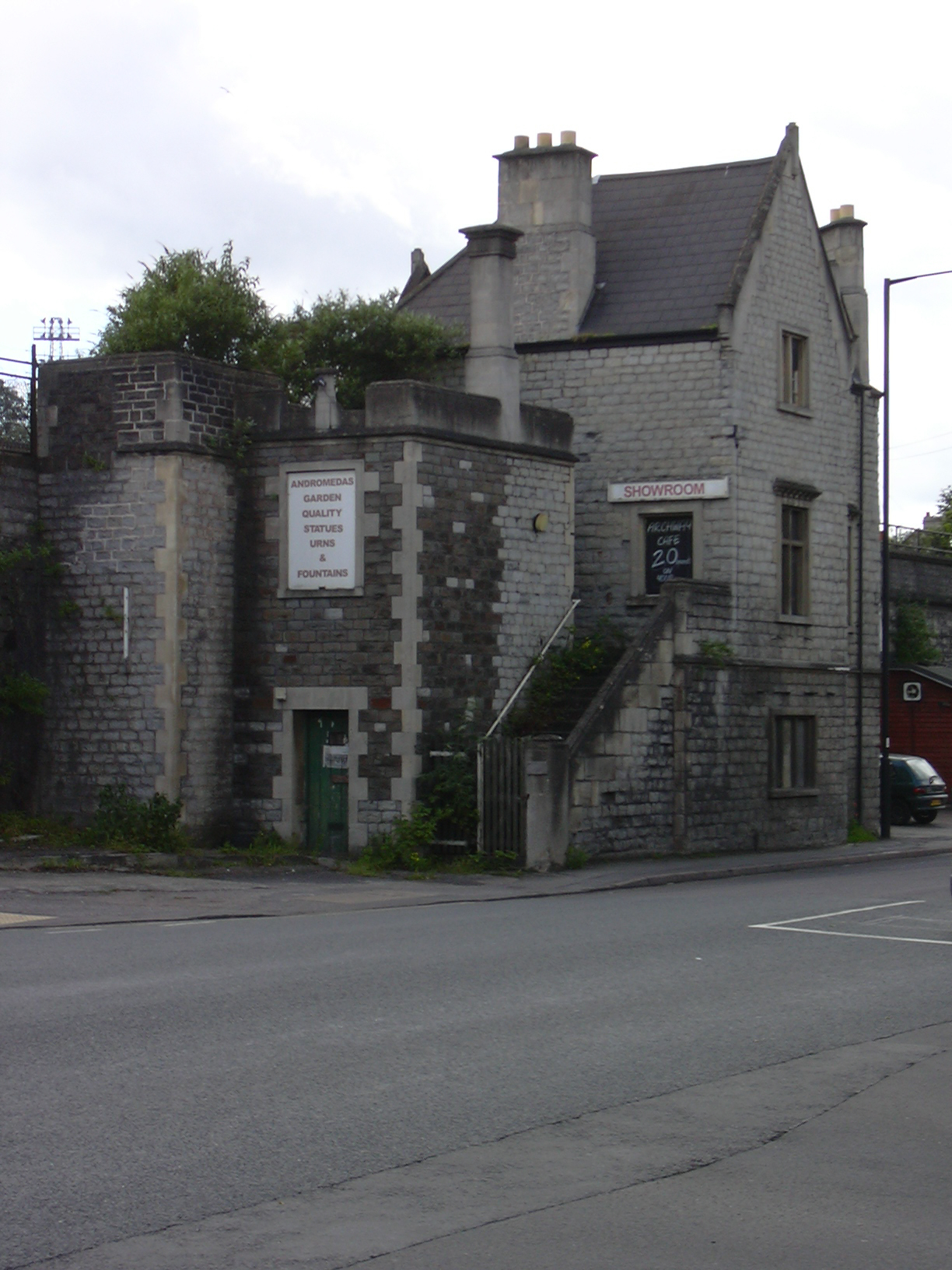
- Twerton-on-Avon station from Lower Bristol road opposite Twerton High Street.

General information
- Location: Twerton, Bath; England
- Platforms: 2

Other information
- Status: Disused

History
- Original company: Great Western Railway
- Pre-grouping: Great Western Railway

Key dates
- 16 December 1840: Opened (Twerton)
- 1899: Renamed (Twerton-on-Avon)
- 1917: Closed

Listed Building – Grade II
- Official name: Twerton Viaduct, the Old Station House and Nos 1 to 13 the Arches
- Designated: 2 December 2021
- Reference no.: 1395144
Location

Twerton on Avon railway station is a former railway station in Bath, Somerset.

== Architecture and opening ==
Twerton was named after the village that it served (west of Bath on the south bank of the Avon) though at the time it was also called Twiverton. The station was built in Gothic style variously called Tudor or Jacobethan. This style is seen from the tunnel mouths west of Twerton to Bath Spa station including many arches and embellishment in the viaduct itself. This is something of a contrast to the Georgian buildings in the centre of Bath north of the river, but is reflected in the Victorian domestic architecture on the southern suburbs. It opened as a railway station on 16 December 1840 for Great Western Railway services from Bristol. Four trains a day stopped at Twerton in each direction (out of eleven services each way between Bath and Bristol).

== Subsequent history ==
Twerton station was operated by the Great Western Railway but was renamed Twerton on Avon in 1899 to avoid confusion with Tiverton.

== Closure ==
The station was closed in 1917 as an economy measure during the First World War. Passenger traffic into Bath had been reduced by competition from the electric tram line which terminated in Twerton, and the station was not reopened after the end of the war. In 1929, Oldfield Park station was opened nearby (but closer to Bath).

Preceding station	Historical railways	Following station
Saltford	Great Western Railway; Great Western Main Line	Oldfield Park

== Current uses ==
This picture from September 2007 shows further deterioration

The station building, like the viaduct on which it sits, is a Grade II listed structure. It had been boarded up and abandoned as of May 2006 but is now reopened as offices for a local property maintenance firm. A roadside cafe operates from its forecourt but does not occupy any original parts of the station.

In December 2017, a local resident, Sean Dudden, proposed the reopening of the station.
