= Royal Hotel, Bath =

Hotel in Bath, England

Coordinates: 51.378111°N 2.35672°W

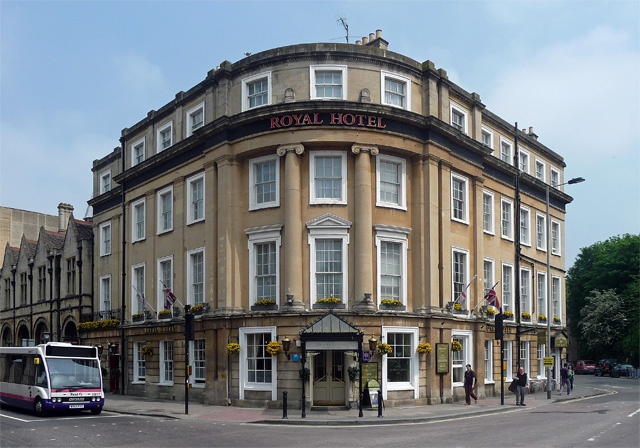
View of the hotel from the station

The Royal Hotel is a Grade II listed hotel in Bath, Somerset, adjacent to Bath Spa railway station. It was constructed as a luxury hotel by the Great Western Railway in 1846, and was originally directly connected to the station.

== Location ==
The hotel is on a junction between Manvers Street and Railway Place, facing the eastern side of the former. It is an L-shaped building with a quadrant corner facing the station. There is an additional wing to the right of the main construction, beyond the main boundary wall.

== History ==
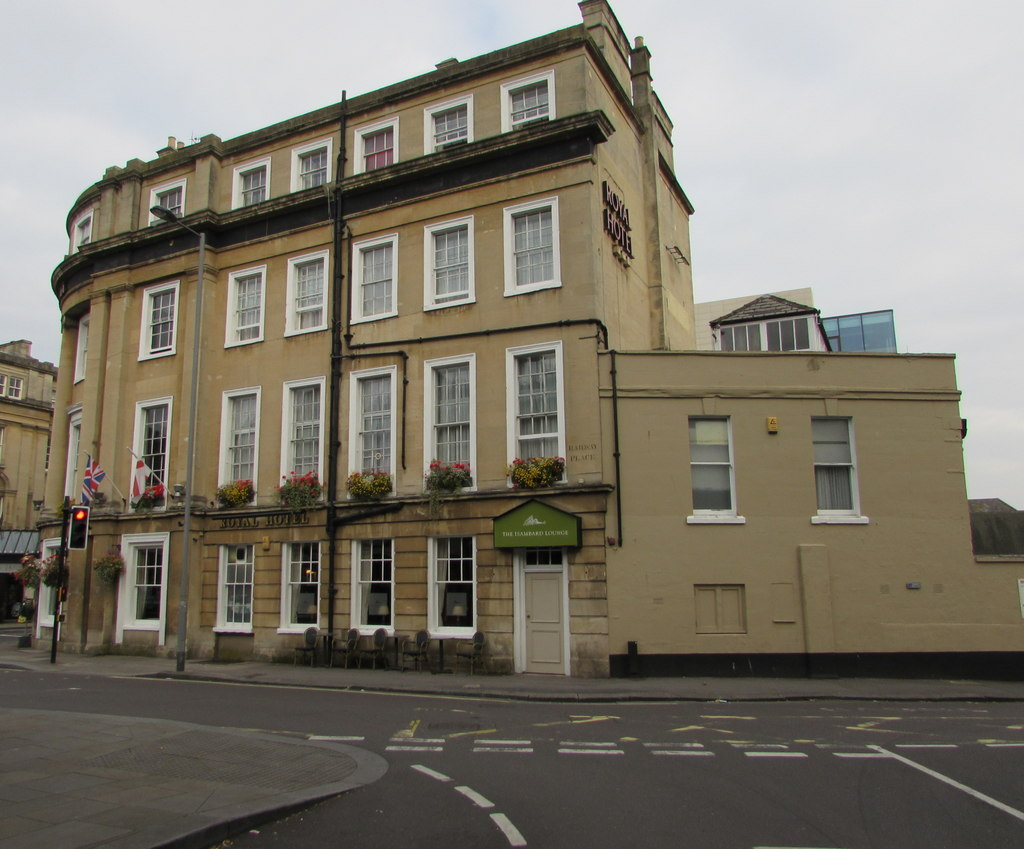
View from Railway Place, including the side wing

The hotel was planned as part of the 1835 Great Western Railway (GWR) act, along with the neighbouring Argyll Hotel on Dorchester Street, which would make a formal entrance to the city from the GWR's station.

It opened as the Royal Station Hotel in 1846, and is believed to have been designed by HE Goodridge. (Note: Some sources claim the hotel was designed by Isambard Kingdom Brunel, but this not mentioned in the National Heritage List for England listing.) It was marketed as a first class hotel for train travellers. Queen Victoria is known to have stayed at the station.

Like numerous buildings in the city, it was constructed in the expected classical style out of limestone ashlar with a slate roof. It has an L-shaped plan, with three full-sized storeys, an attic and basement. The central quadrant features a pair of Ionic columns and Doric antae. The ground floor had three separate parlours and a bar, while upstairs housed seven suites along with a servant's closet, and a toilet on each floor (as was typical of the time).

The hotel originally had a direct link to the station, accessed via a footbridge on the first floor. Guards carried luggage directly from the hotel onto the station platform. It was demolished in 1936.

The hotel retained its original name into the 20th century. It became Grade II listed in 1972, when it was known as the Berni Royal Hotel. It has since been transferred to private ownership and restored to its original Victorian architecture.
