= Westmoreland Road goods yard =

Former railway goods station in Bath, England

Coordinates: 51.3781°N 2.3672°W

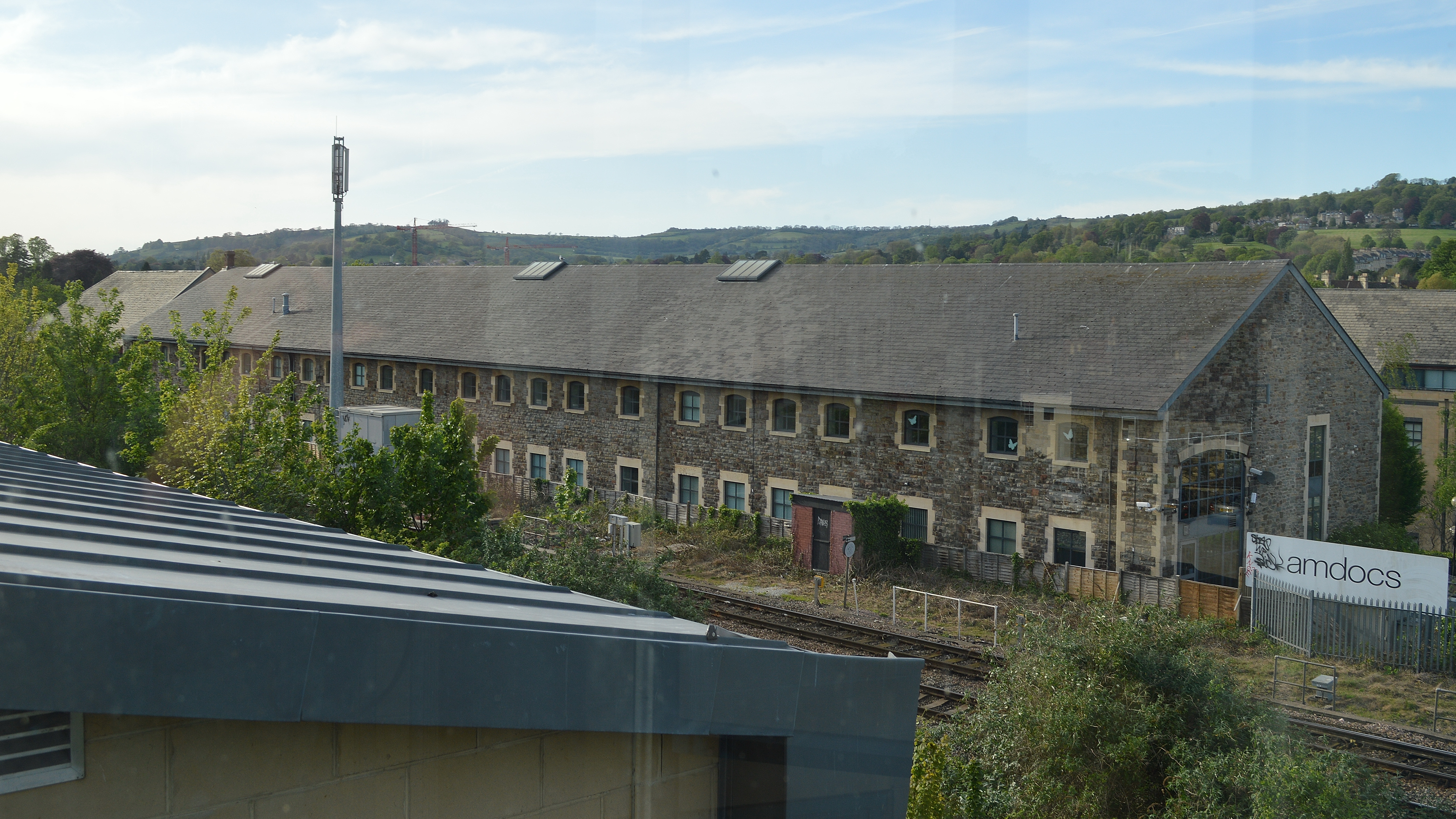
- Former goods shed, then part of The Square, an office development on the site of the goods yard

General information
- Location: Bath, Bath and North East Somerset; England

Other information
- Status: Disused

History
- Original company: Great Western Railway

Key dates
- 1877: Depot opened
- 1967: Goods shed closed, sidings remain open for full loads
- 1980: Up-side sidings close
- 1980s: Down-side sidings become refuse transfer terminal (Westmoreland Railhead)
- 2011: Refuse transfer terminal closes
Location

Westmoreland Road goods yard was the main Great Western Railway goods station for the city of Bath in England, situated on the main line between the passenger stations of Oldfield Park and Bath (now Bath Spa).

It took its name from Westmoreland Road, by which it stood. The official name of the station is uncertain. Railway historian Colin G. Maggs variously used Westmoreland Goods Yard, Westmoreland Road goods yard and Westmoreland Yard goods depot in his book covering this part of the Great Western Railway line.

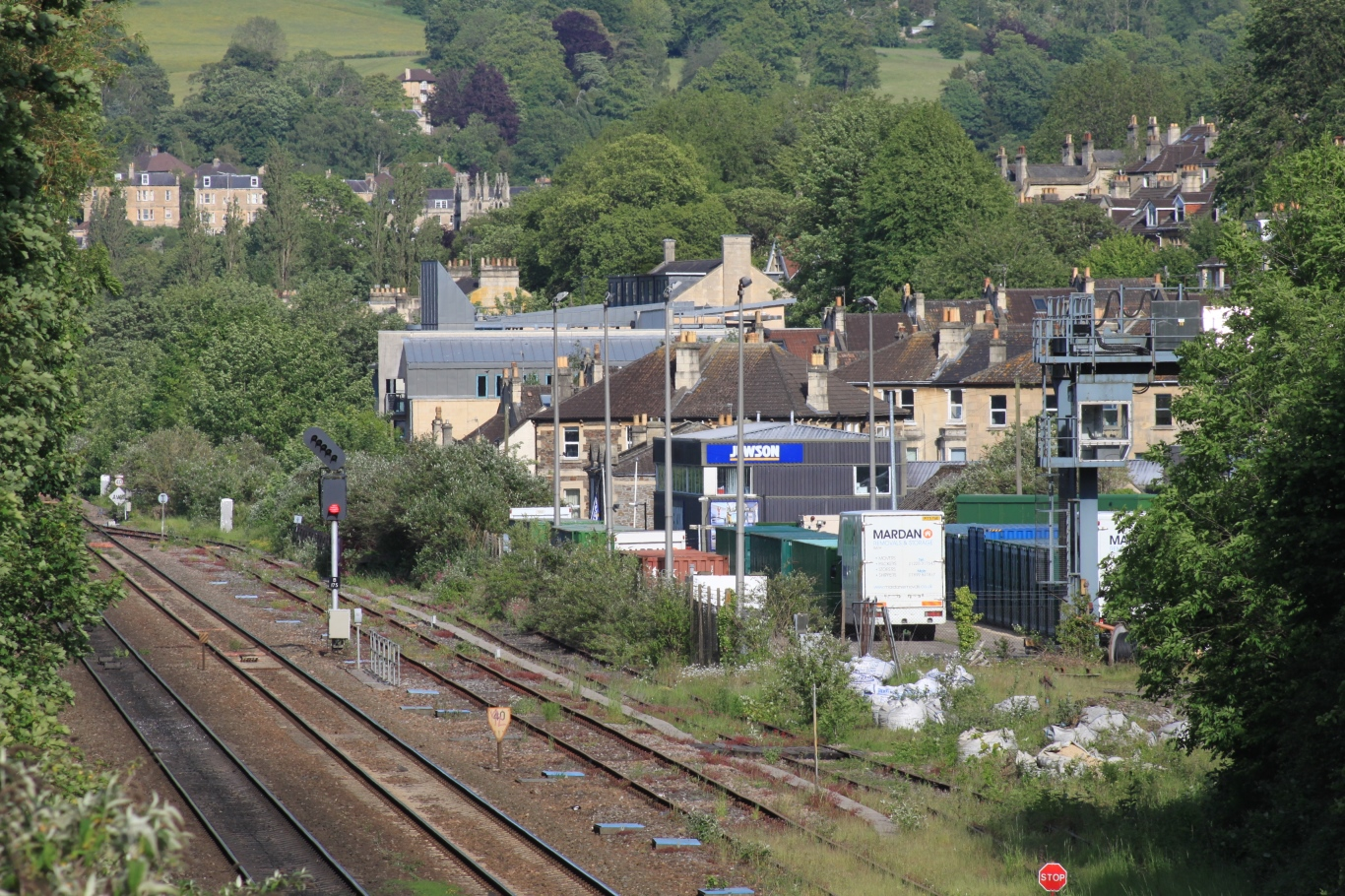
The down-side sidings in 2015

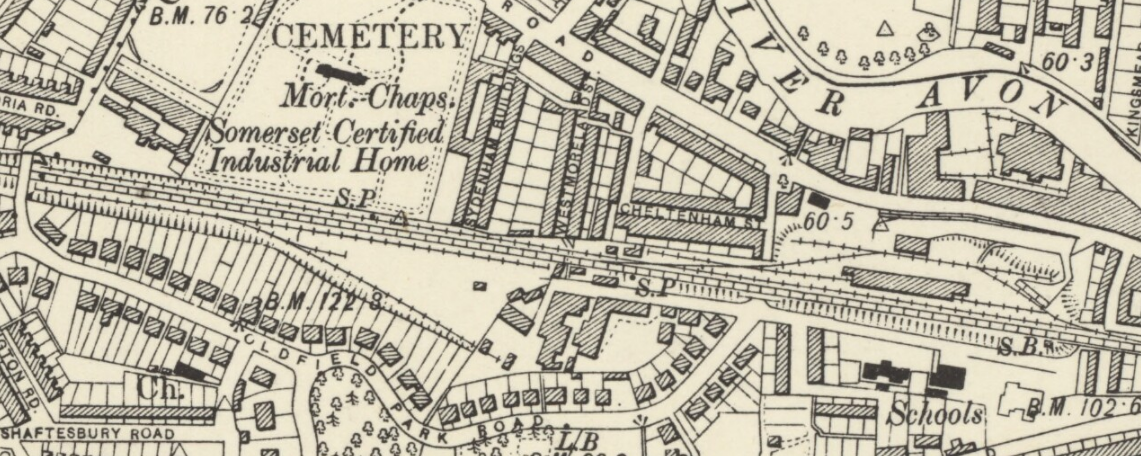
1902 map showing goods shed and yard, and its associated down side sidings (Bath West) on the west side of the Westmoreland Road railway bridge

The goods depot was opened in 1877, freeing space at the constrained Bath Spa station site. A small engine shed was also moved from Bath Spa to Westmoreland in 1880. The goods depot was located on the up side of the line, fronting onto the Lower Bristol Road, opposite the Newark Works of crane makers Stothert & Pitt. Further west on the down side towards Oldfield Park railway station, on the other side of Westmoreland Road, was located a goods loop and four sidings, called Bath West.

One notable event was the unloading in 1903 of the special train for Buffalo Bill & His Wild West Show. A more frequent event putting heavy demands on the depot was whenever the Bath and West Show was held in Bath, and horse arrivals for the Bath Racecourse. In April 1942 German bombing caused major damage to the goods depot.

Until 1911 the yard was controlled by two signal boxes, Westmoreland East and Westmoreland West. In 1911 these were replaced by a single signal box called Bath Goods.

The Bath engine shed at Westmoreland closed in February 1961. The goods depot closed in May 1967, but the sidings remained open for full loads until 31 December 1980. In the 1980s the goods depot was redeveloped into an office development called The Square. The former goods shed was converted into one of the office buildings, which in 2026 was planned to become student accommodation.

The down side sidings (Bath West) were developed as a refuse transfer terminal, called Westmoreland Railhead, by Avon County Council in the mid-1980s, taking waste to a landfill site in Calvert, Buckinghamshire. The refuse transfer terminal remained in operation until 2011 when a new mechanical biological waste treatment plant opened in Avonmouth.

A passageway at the western end of Westmoreland Station Road still gives pedestrian access under the railway to Westmoreland Street; in 2018 a review of the Widcombe public rights of way recommended that it be classified as such.
