= Great Western Main Line =

Principal main line railway in England

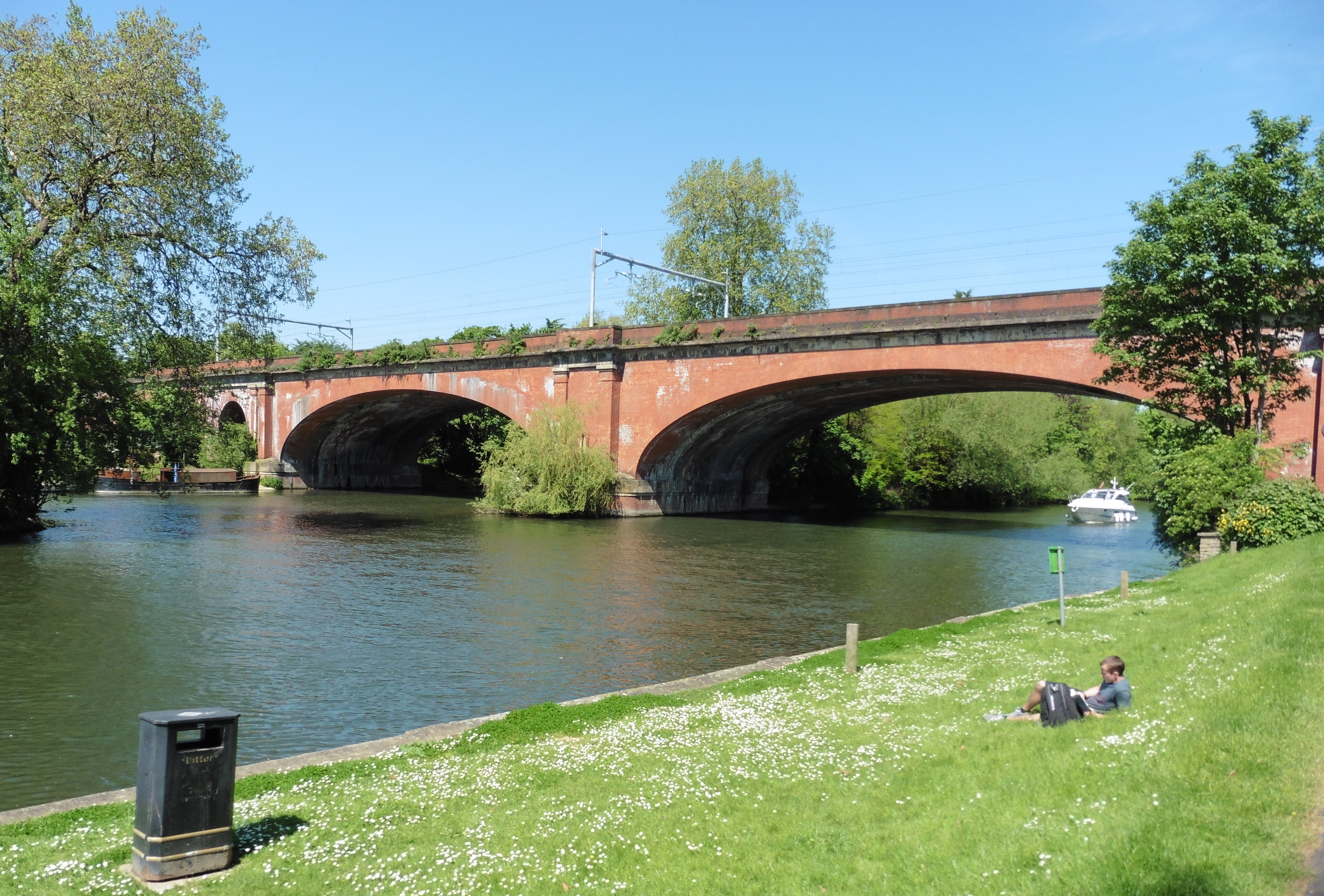
- Maidenhead Railway Bridge carrying the line over the River Thames

Overview
- Status: Operational
- Owner: Network Rail
- Locale: Greater London; South East England; South West England
- Termini: London Paddington; Bristol Temple Meads
- Stations: 25

Service
- Type: Commuter rail, Higher-speed rail
- System: National Rail
- Operators: Great Western Railway; Elizabeth line; Heathrow Express; CrossCountry
- Depots: North Pole; Reading; St Philip's Marsh
- Rolling stock: Class 158; Class 159; Class 165; Class 166; Class 220; Class 221; Class 345; Class 387; Class 800; Class 802

History
- Opened: 4 June 1838; 188 years ago
- Last extension: 1841

Technical
- Line length: 118 miles 19 chains (190.28 km)
- Num of tracks: 4 (London to Didcot); 2 (Didcot to Bristol)
- Track gauge: 4 ft 8 1/2 in (1,435 mm)
- Old gauge: 7 ft 1/4 in (2,140 mm)
- Electrification: 25 kV 50 Hz AC OLE (London to Chippenham)
- Operating speed: 125 mph (200 km/h)
- Signalling: AWS, TPWS, ATP
Route map
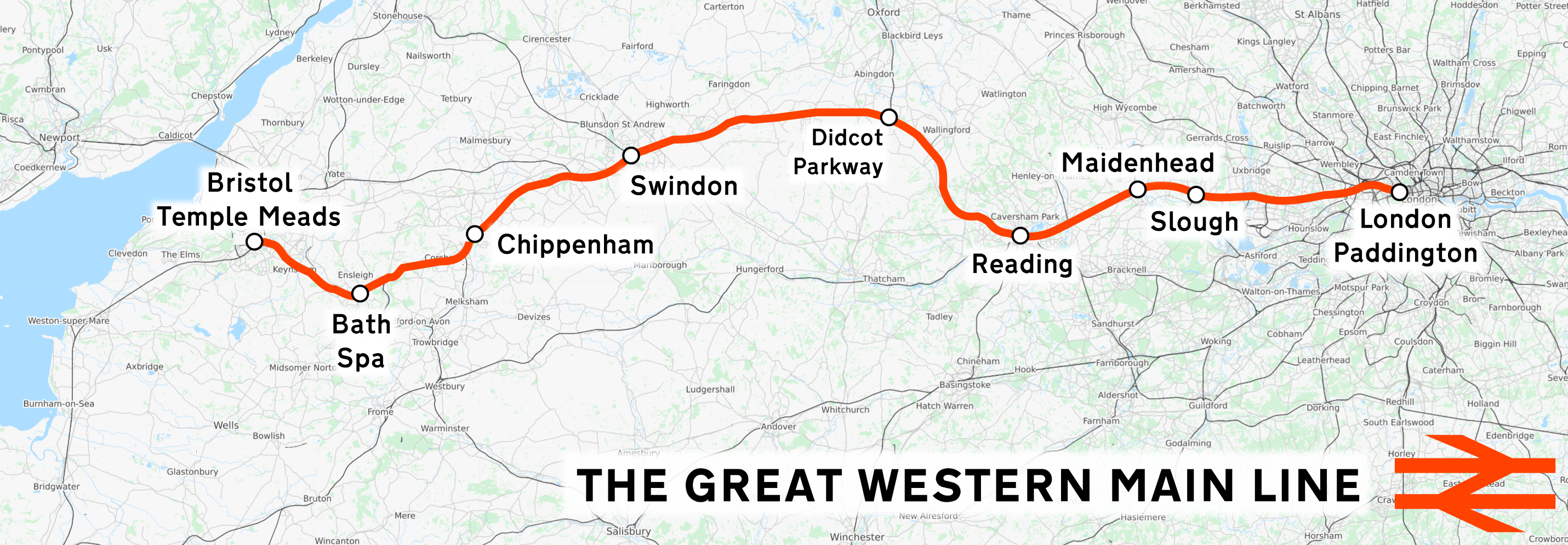

The Great Western Main Line (GWML) is a main line railway in England that runs between London Paddington and Bristol Temple Meads. It connects to other main lines such as those from Reading to Penzance and Swindon to Swansea. The GWML is presently a part of the national rail system managed by Network Rail, while the majority of passenger services upon it are provided by the current Great Western Railway franchise.

The GWML was built by the original Great Western Railway company between 1838 and 1841, as a dual track line in the 7 ft (2,134 mm) broad gauge. The broad gauge remained in use until 1892, after which standard gauge track has been exclusively used. Between 1877 and 1932, many sections of the GWML were widened to four tracks. During 1908, Automatic Train Control (ATC) was introduced as a safety measure. In 1948, the Great Western Railway, and thus the GWML, was merged into the Western Region of British Railways.

During the 1970s, the GWML was upgraded to support higher line speeds, as a result of which many sections permitted 125 mph (201 km/h) operations, enabling the newly introduced InterCity 125 high speed train (HST) to make faster journeys. British Rail proposed widespread electrification of the line in the late 1970s, although this was not speedily implemented. During the mid-1990s, a stretch of the GWML between London Paddington and Hayes & Harlington was electrified using 25 kV AC overhead lines for the Heathrow Express. Further, although not total, electrification was carried out during the 2010s; this permitted the replacement of diesel-powered trains such as the InterCity 125 and Class 180 with electric and bi-mode train sets such as the Hitachi Super Express high speed trains, specifically the Class 800 and Class 802. Due to budget overruns, the British government deferred electrification of the section through Bath Spa from Royal Wootton Bassett to Bristol in 2016.

The route includes dozens of listed buildings and structures, including tunnel portals, bridges and viaducts, stations, and associated hotels. Presently, the GWML is electrified between London Paddington and Royal Wootton Bassett. In the long term, Network Rail plans to install European Rail Traffic Management System (ERTMS) in-cab signalling across the entire line.

== History ==
=== Construction ===
The construction of what would become the GWML was motivated by several factors, one of the more influential being the sizeable merchant community of Bristol, which keenly advocated for such a railway to be built to help maintain the city's position as the second port of the country as well as the chief one for American trade. More specifically, fearing rising competition from Liverpool and railway developments to its favour, the sought railway was to be preferably built to superior standards as to out-perform any of the lines serving the North West of England. Thus, the line built by the Great Western Railway and engineered by Isambard Kingdom Brunel was originally a dual track line using a wider 7 ft (2,134 mm) broad gauge. The line's construction costs were considerably higher due to the use of this broad gauge.

The route of the GWML includes dozens of listed buildings and structures, including tunnel portals, bridges and viaducts, stations, and associated hotels. Part of the route passes through and contributes to the Georgian Architecture of the City of Bath World Heritage Site; the path through Sydney Gardens has been described as a "piece of deliberate railway theatre by Brunel without parallel". Grade I listed structures on the line include London Paddington, Wharncliffe Viaduct, the 1839 Tudor gothic River Avon Bridge in Bristol, and Bristol Temple Meads station.

The line was opened in stages between 1838 and 1841. The first section, between Paddington and Maidenhead Bridge opened on 4 June 1838; the final section, between Chippenham and Bath, was opened on completion of the Box Tunnel, the longest railway tunnel driven by that time, in June 1841. The line's alignment was so level and straight it was nicknamed "Brunel's billiard table".

=== Changes under the Great Western Railway ===
The track was supplemented with a third rail for dual gauge operation, allowing standard gauge 4 ft 8 1/2 in (1,435 mm) trains to also operate on the route, in stages between 1854 and 1875. Dual gauge was introduced as follows: London to Reading (October 1861), Reading to Didcot (December 1856), Didcot to Swindon (February 1872), Swindon to Thingley Junction, Chippenham (June 1874), Thingley Junction to Bathampton (March 1875), Bathampton to Bristol (June 1874), Bristol station area (May 1854). The broad gauge remained in use until 1892, at which point the last 500 miles of track were converted to standard gauge.

Between 1877 and 1899, the original dual tracks were widened to four in numerous places, mainly in the east half of the line: Paddington to Southall (October 1877), Southall to West Drayton (November 1878), West Drayton to Slough (June 1879), Slough to east side of Maidenhead Bridge (September 1884), Maidenhead Bridge to Reading (June 1893), Reading station (1899), Reading to Pangbourne (July 1893), Pangbourne to Cholsey and Moulsford (June 1894), Cholsey and Moulsford to Didcot (December 1892).

Following the Slough rail accident of 1900, in which five passengers were killed, improved vacuum braking systems were used on locomotives and passenger rolling stock; furthermore, Automatic Train Control (ATC) was introduced in 1908.

Further widenings of the line took place between 1903 and 1910; another round of widening works occurred between 1931 and 1932. By the 1930s, trains traversing the GWML were reportedly attaining the highest average speeds in the world.

A legacy of the broad gauge was that trains for some routes could be built slightly wider than was normal in Britain; examples included the 1929-built Super Saloons used on the boat train services that conveyed transatlantic passengers to London in luxury. When the company celebrated its centenary during 1935, new "Centenary" carriages were built for the Cornish Riviera Express, which again made full use of the wider loading gauge on that route.

At the outbreak of the First World War in 1914, the Great Western Railway, and thus the GWML, was taken into government control, as were most major railways in Britain. After the conflict, the companies were reorganised into the "big four" companies, of which the Great Western Railway was one. The railways, including the GWML, returned to direct government control during the Second World War before being nationalised to form British Railways (BR) in 1948, thus bringing the line into public ownership.

=== British Rail era ===
Unlike the other BR regions, which introduced diesel-electric locomotives, the Western Region, to which the GWML belonged, decided to procure a complete range of diesel-hydraulic locomotives to fulfil its type 1 to type 4 power requirements. These included the Warship locomotives, which were based on proven West German designs, the British-designed Class 14, Hymek and Western types. However, these were all eventually withdrawn and replaced with more standard British Rail diesel-electric classes such as the Class 37 and Class 47.

During the 1970s, the line speed of the GWML was upgraded to permit faster operations; this work was in preparation for the introduction of the InterCity 125 high speed train (HST). The HST brought about considerable improvements in service and reduced journey times.

In 1977, the Parliamentary Select Committee on Nationalised Industries recommended considering electrification of more of Britain's rail network and, by 1979, British Rail had presented a range of options that included electrifying the line from Paddington to Swansea by 2000. Under the 1979–90 Conservative governments that succeeded the 1976–79 Labour government, the proposal was not implemented.

In the mid-1990s, the line between London Paddington and Hayes & Harlington was electrified as part of the Heathrow Express scheme, which was officially launched in June 1998.

=== Privatisation era ===
As part of the privatisation of British Rail, the Great Western InterCity franchise was awarded by the Director of Passenger Rail Franchising to Great Western Holdings in December 1995, and it began operations on 4 February 1996. Via multiple contract extensions, this operator, which currently trades as Great Western Railway has been the primary operator of passenger services on the GWML for multiple decades.

In August 2008, it was announced that a number of speed limits on the relief lines between Reading and London had been raised, so that 86% of the line could be used at 90 mph (140 km/h).

By 2019, the partial electrification of the GWML permitted the replacement of InterCity 125 and Class 180 sets by new Hitachi Super Express high speed trains – the Class 800 and Class 802. The procurement programme for these trains, known as the Intercity Express Programme, was highly impacted by the GWML's electrification scheme, particularly the abandonment of diesel-only trains in favour of bi-mode trains, which were elongated and outfitted with a second transformer to maximise their use of the electrified sections. The electrification of the line also allowed the introduction of other rolling stock, such as Class 387 electric multiple units, to conduct shorter-distance services.

== Route ==
The main communities served by the Great Western Main Line are West London (including Acton, Ealing, Hanwell, Southall, Hayes, Harlington and West Drayton), Iver, Langley, Slough, Burnham, Taplow, Maidenhead, Twyford, Reading, Tilehurst, Pangbourne, Goring-on-Thames, Streatley; Cholsey, Didcot, Swindon, Chippenham, Bath, Keynsham and Bristol.

From London to Didcot, the line follows the Thames Valley, crossing the River Thames three times, including on the Maidenhead Railway Bridge. Between Chippenham and Bath the line passes through Box Tunnel, and then follows the valley of the River Avon.

A junction west of Swindon allows trains to reach Bristol by an alternative route along the South Wales Main Line. Other diversionary routes exist between Chippenham and Bath via Melksham and the Wessex Main Line, although this involves a reversal at Bradford Junction; and from Reading to Bath via the Reading–Taunton line.

== Services ==
Services of three train operating companies use the line:

- Great Western Railway (GWR) operates most services:
  - Inter-city trains run between London Paddington and Bristol Temple Meads, via Reading, Didcot Parkway, Swindon, Chippenham and Bath Spa; some services do not call at Didcot Parkway.
  - Inter-city services between London Paddington – Cardiff Central operate every 30 minutes, with hourly extensions to Swansea. At Swansea/Cardiff, there is a connecting Transport for Wales' boat train to/from Fishguard Harbour for the Stena Line ferry to Rosslare Europort in Ireland. An integrated timetable is offered between London Paddington and Rosslare Europort with through ticketing available. Daytime and nocturnal journeys are offered in both directions daily.
  - Heathrow Express trains from Paddington to London Heathrow Airport, on behalf of Heathrow Airport Holdings.
- Elizabeth line services run on the Great Western Main Line between London and Reading.
- CrossCountry operates long-distance trains using the GWML between Reading and Didcot Parkway.

== Infrastructure ==
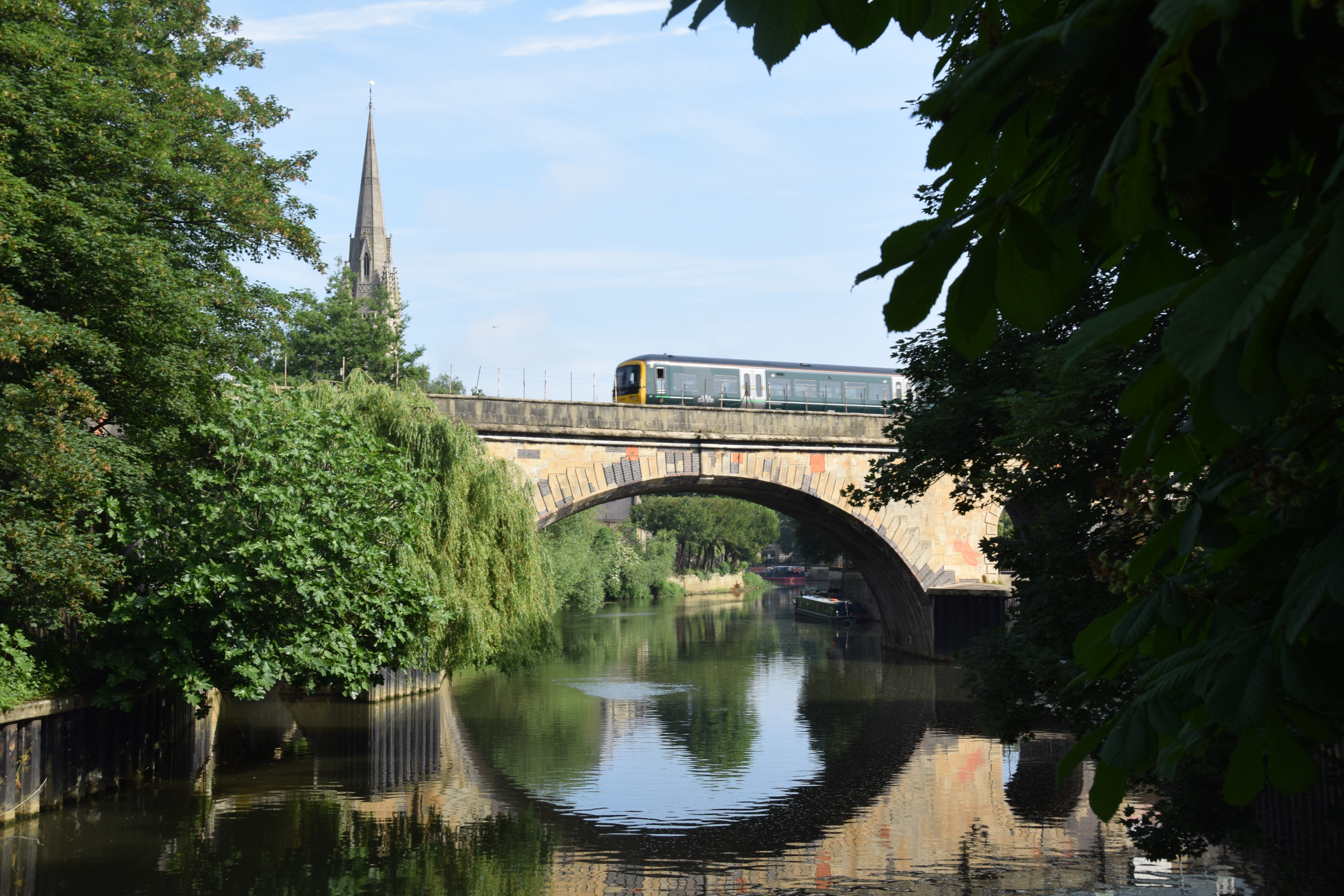
St James Railway Bridge, Bath

There are four tracks between London and Didcot, two in each direction. The main lines are mostly used by the faster trains and are on the south side of the route. The relief lines on the north side are used for slower services and those that call at all stations, as only London Paddington, Slough, Maidenhead, Twyford, Reading and Didcot Parkway stations have platforms on the main lines (although a few others have main line platforms that can be used in an emergency). Between Didcot and Royal Wootton Bassett, a series of passing loops allow fast trains to overtake slower ones. This section is signalled for bi-directional running on each line but this facility is usually only used during engineering working or when there is significant disruption to traffic in one direction.

The summit of the line is at Swindon and falls away in each direction: Swindon is 270 feet (82 m) above Paddington and 292 feet (89 m) above Bristol Temple Meads. The maximum gradient between Paddington and Didcot is 1 in 1320 (0.75 ‰ or 0.075%); between Didcot and Swindon it is 1 in 660 (1.5 ‰ or 0.15%), but west of Swindon, gradients as steep as 1 in 100 (10 ‰ or 1%) are found in places, such as Box Tunnel and to the east of Dauntsey.

The line is electrified between Paddington and Langley Burrell (just east of Chippenham) using 25 kV AC overhead supply lines; the Reading to Taunton line (as far as Newbury) and the South Wales Main Line (as far as Cardiff Central) are also electrified.

The line speed is 125 mph (201 km/h). The relief lines from Paddington to Didcot are limited to 90 mph (140 km/h) as far as Reading, and then 100 mph (160 km/h) to Didcot. Lower restrictions apply at various locations. The line is one of two Network Rail-owned lines equipped with the Automatic Train Protection (ATP) system, the other being the Chiltern Main Line.

=== Tunnels, viaducts and major bridges ===
Major civil engineering structures on the Great Western Main Line include the following.

Tunnels, viaducts and major bridges on the Great Western Main Line
Railway structure	Length	Distance from London Paddington	Location
Subway Tunnel (LU)	117 yards (107 m)	0 miles 67 chains (1.3 km) – 0 miles 73 chains (1.5 km)	West of Royal Oak
Spring Bridge Road Car Park Tunnel	121 yards (111 m)	5 miles 70 chains (9.5 km) – 5 miles 76 chains (9.6 km)	West of Ealing Broadway
Hanwell Viaduct	44 yards (40 m)	7 miles 35 chains (12.0 km) – 7 miles 38 chains (12.0 km)	West of Hanwell
Wharncliffe Viaduct	297 yards (272 m)	7 miles 43 chains (12.1 km) – 7 miles 56 chains (12.4 km)	West of Hanwell
Hanwell Bridge	4 chains (80 m)	8 miles 00 chains (12.9 km) – 8 miles 04 chains (13.0 km)	West of Hanwell
Maidenhead Viaduct (River Thames)	237 yards (217 m)	23 miles 21 chains (37.4 km) – 23 miles 32 chains (37.7 km)	East of Maidenhead
Seven Arch Viaduct	68 yards (62 m)	31 miles 19 chains (50.3 km) – 31 miles 22 chains (50.3 km)	West of Twyford
River Loddon Viaduct	70 yards (64 m)	31 miles 43 chains (50.8 km) – 31 miles 46 chains (50.8 km)	West of Twyford
Kennet Bridge (Kennet & Avon Canal)	4 chains (80 m)	34 miles 77 chains (56.3 km) – 35 miles 01 chain (56.3 km)	East of Reading
Reading flyover	1.25 miles (2.01 km)	41 miles 77 chains (67.5 km) – 42 miles 20 chains (68.0 km)	West of Reading
Gatehampton Viaduct (River Thames)	99 yards (91 m)	44 miles 00 chains (70.8 km) – 44 miles 05 chains (70.9 km)	East of Goring & Streatley
Moulsford Viaduct (River Thames)	147 yards (134 m)	47 miles 27 chains (76.2 km) – 47 miles 34 chains (76.3 km)	East of Cholsey
River Avon Viaduct	72 yards (66 m)	90 miles 77 chains (146.4 km) – 91 miles 00 chains (146.5 km)	East of Chippenham
Chippenham viaduct	90 yards (82 m)	94 miles 08 chains (151.4 km) – 94 miles 13 chains (151.5 km)	West of Chippenham
Box Tunnel	1 mile 1,452 yards (2.937 km)	99 miles 12 chains (159.6 km) – 100 miles 78 chains (162.5 km)	Between Chippenham and Bath Spa
Middle Hill Tunnel	198 yards (181 m)	101 miles 39 chains (163.3 km) – 101 miles 48 chains (163.5 km)	Between Chippenham and Bath Spa
Sydney Gardens East Tunnel	77 yards (70 m)	106 miles 24 chains (171.1 km) – 106 miles 28 chains (171.2 km)	East of Bath Spa
Sydney Gardens West Tunnel	99 yards (91 m)	106 miles 29 chains (171.2 km) – 106 miles 33 chains (171.3 km)	East of Bath Spa
Dolemeads Viaduct	355 yards (325 m)	106 miles 49 chains (171.6 km) – 106 miles 60 chains (171.8 km)	East of Bath Spa
Arches and St James Viaduct	600 yards (550 m)	106 miles 68 chains (172.0 km) – 107 miles 20 chains (172.6 km)	West of Bath Spa
Twerton Viaduct	638 yards (583 m)	108 miles 29 chains (174.4 km) – 108 miles 58 chains (175.0 km)	Between Oldfield Park and Keynsham
Twerton Short Tunnel	45 yards (41 m)	108 miles 70 chains (175.2 km) – 108 miles 72 chains (175.3 km)	Between Oldfield Park and Keynsham
Twerton Long Tunnel	264 yards (241 m)	109 miles 03 chains (175.5 km) – 109 miles 15 chains (175.7 km)	Between Oldfield Park and Keynsham
Saltford Tunnel	176 yards (161 m)	111 miles 57 chains (179.8 km) – 111 miles 65 chains (179.9 km)	Between Oldfield Park and Keynsham
St Annes Park Arches Viaduct	4 chains (80 m)	115 miles 25 chains (185.6 km) – 115 miles 29 chains (185.7 km)	Between Keynsham and Bristol Temple Meads
St Annes Park No.3 Tunnel (or Foxes Wood Tunnel)	1,017 yards (930 m)	115 miles 58 chains (186.2 km) – 116 miles 25 chains (187.2 km)	Between Keynsham and Bristol Temple Meads
St Annes Park or (Bristol) No.2 Tunnel	154 yards (141 m)	116 miles 41 chains (187.5 km) – 116 miles 48 chains (187.6 km)	Between Keynsham and Bristol Temple Meads
Main River Viaduct (River Avon)	108 yards (99 m)	c. 117 miles 24 chains (188.8 km)	Between Keynsham and Bristol Temple Meads
Main Down Viaduct (River Avon)	141 yards (129 m)	117 miles 21 chains (188.7 km) – 117 miles 27 chains (188.8 km)	Between Keynsham and Bristol Temple Meads
The Feeder		117 miles 51 chains (189.3 km)	Between Keynsham and Bristol Temple Meads
Floating Harbour	3 chains (60 m)	118 miles 16 chains (190.2 km) – 118 miles 19 chains (190.3 km)	Between Keynsham and Bristol Temple Meads

==== Line-side monitoring equipment ====
Line-side train monitoring equipment includes hot axle box detectors (HABD) and Wheelchex wheel impact load detectors (WILD), sited as follows.

Line-side monitoring equipment on the Great Western Main Line
Name & Type	Line	Location (distance from Paddington)
Maidenhead HABD	Up Relief	24 miles 03 chains (38.7 km)
Maidenhead HABD	Up Main	24 miles 10 chains (38.8 km)
Waltham WILD	Up Relief, Down Relief, Up Main, Down Main	26 miles 21 chains (42.3 km)
Twyford HABD	Down Relief, Down Main	32 miles 02 chains (51.5 km)
Basildon HABD	Up Relief, Down Relief, Up Main (Down Main disconnected December 2016)	43 miles 42 chains (70.0 km)
Cholsey WILD	Up Relief, Down Relief, Up Main, Down Main	49 miles 05 chains (79.0 km)
Wantage Road HABD	Up Main	59 miles 57 chains (96.1 km)
Bourton HABD	Down Main	72 miles 20 chains (116.3 km)
Studley HABD	Up Main	81 miles 40 chains (131.2 km)
Twerton HABD	Down Main	108 miles 60 chains (175.0 km)

== Recent developments ==
From 2011, the GWML underwent a £5 billion modernisation by Network Rail.

Reading station saw a major redevelopment with new platforms, a new entrance, footbridge and lifts; the work was completed a year ahead of schedule in July 2014.

Signalling Solutions resignalled the 12 miles (19 km) from Paddington to West Drayton, including the Airport branch, as part of the Elizabeth line.

=== Electrification ===
The eastern section from Paddington to Hayes & Harlington was electrified in 1998. The Crossrail project covered electrification of the line from Airport Junction to Maidenhead and, following a number of announcements and delays, the government announced in March 2011 that it would electrify the line as far as Bristol Temple Meads.

Following delays to the work and a large increase in costs, the Conservative government announced in July 2017 that, for the time being, electrification would only be completed as far as Thingley Junction, 2 miles (3.2 km) west of Chippenham. Electrification as far as Didcot Parkway was completed in December 2017, and to Thingley Junction in December 2019.

Electrification of associated lines, including Bristol Parkway to Temple Meads and Didcot to Oxford, was also postponed indefinitely; electrification of the route between London and Cardiff was completed in 2019. The government argued that bi-mode trains would fill in the gaps pending completion of electrification, although the Class 800 trains are slower in diesel mode than under electric power.

=== Other proposals ===
Access to Heathrow Airport from the west remains an aspiration and the 2009 Heathrow Airtrack scheme, abandoned in 2011, proposed a route south of the Great Western Main Line to link the airport with Reading. Plans for electrification of the line will make it easier to access Heathrow from Reading, since lack of electrification between Reading station and Airport Junction (near West Drayton station) was a limiting factor. Plans under consideration in 2014 included new tunnels between Heathrow and Langley.

=== Calls for station reopenings ===
There are calls for the reintroduction of Corsham station due to recent growth of the town. The original station was closed to passengers in 1965.

A local group is campaigning for the reopening of Saltford station between Bath and Bristol, to coincide with electrification.

There have also been calls to reopen the former Wantage Road station. Oxfordshire County Council included a proposal for a new station to serve Wantage and Grove in their 2015–2031 local transport plan.

== Major incidents ==
- Slough rail accident – 16 June 1900: An express train from Paddington to Falmouth Docks ran through two sets of signals at danger and collided with a local train heading for Windsor. Five passengers were killed and 35 seriously injured.
- Ealing rail crash – 19 December 1973: A train from Paddington to Oxford derailed after a loose battery box cover on the Class 52 Western locomotive hauling the train struck lineside equipment, causing a set of points to move under the train. Ten passengers were killed and 94 injured.
- Southall rail crash – 19 September 1997: An InterCity 125 service from Swansea to Paddington, operated by Great Western Trains, failed to stop at a red signal and collided with a freight train entering Southall goods yard. Seven people were killed and 139 were injured. The incident severely damaged public confidence in the safety of the rail system. It was found that the train's automatic warning system (AWS) was faulty, and the driver had been distracted (he had bent down to pack his bag). Great Western Trains was fined £1.5 million for violations of health and safety law in connection with the accident.
- Ladbroke Grove rail crash – 5 October 1999: A Thames Trains service from Paddington to Bedwyn passed a signal at danger at the gantry protecting a main set of (crossover) points between the one-way and bi-directionally used lines. The train ran the wrong way down the line and was hit head-on by a First Great Western HST service from Cheltenham Spa to Paddington at a closing speed of approximately 130 mph (210 km/h). 31 people died, including both drivers, with more than 520 people injured. Thames Trains was fined £2 million for violations of health and safety law. Railtrack pleaded guilty to charges under the Health and Safety at Work etc. Act 1974 in relation to the accident. It was subsequently fined £4 million and was also ordered to pay £225,000 in costs.

== Rolling stock ==
=== Commuter trains ===
Class	Image	Type	Top speed		Cars per set	Number	Operator	Routes	Built
Class	Image	Type	mph	km/h	Cars per set	Number	Operator	Routes	Built
158		Diesel Multiple Unit	90	145	2	22	Great Western Railway	Cardiff Central – Portsmouth Harbour; Cardiff Central – Exeter St Davids; Bristol Temple Meads – Weymouth	1989–92
158		Diesel Multiple Unit	90	145	3	19	Great Western Railway	Cardiff Central – Portsmouth Harbour; Cardiff Central – Exeter St Davids; Bristol Temple Meads – Weymouth	1989–92
165		Diesel Multiple Unit	90	145	2	20	Great Western Railway	Reading – Gatwick Airport; Reading – Basingstoke; Didcot Parkway – Banbury; Twyford – Henley-on-Thames; Maidenhead – Marlow; Slough – Windsor and Eton Central; West Ealing – Greenford; Bristol Temple Meads – Severn Beach; Great Malvern – Weymouth; Great Malvern – Southampton Central; Swindon – Weymouth; Swindon – Gloucester; Cardiff Central – Portsmouth Harbour	1990–92
165		Diesel Multiple Unit	90	145	3	16	Great Western Railway	Reading – Gatwick Airport; Reading – Basingstoke; Didcot Parkway – Banbury; Twyford – Henley-on-Thames; Maidenhead – Marlow; Slough – Windsor and Eton Central; West Ealing – Greenford; Bristol Temple Meads – Severn Beach; Great Malvern – Weymouth; Great Malvern – Southampton Central; Swindon – Weymouth; Swindon – Gloucester; Cardiff Central – Portsmouth Harbour	1990–92
166		Diesel Multiple Unit	90	145	3	21	Great Western Railway	Reading – Gatwick Airport; Reading – Basingstoke; Didcot Parkway – Banbury; Twyford – Henley-on-Thames; Maidenhead – Marlow; Slough – Windsor and Eton Central; West Ealing – Greenford; Bristol Temple Meads – Severn Beach; Great Malvern – Weymouth; Great Malvern – Southampton Central; Swindon – Weymouth; Swindon – Gloucester; Cardiff Central – Portsmouth Harbour	1992–93
345		Electric Multiple Unit	90	145	9	70	Elizabeth line	Reading – Abbey Wood; Heathrow Terminal 4 – Abbey Wood; Heathrow Terminal 5 – Shenfield	2015–19
387		Electric Multiple Unit	110	177	4	36	Great Western Railway	London Paddington – Didcot Parkway; London Paddington – Cardiff Central; London Paddington – Newbury	2016–17

=== High speed trains ===
Class	Image	Type	Top speed		Cars per set	Number	Operator	Routes	Built
Class	Image	Type	mph	km/h	Cars per set	Number	Operator	Routes	Built
Class 220		DEMU	125	201	4 or 5	34	CrossCountry	Bristol Temple Meads — Exeter, Paignton, Plymouth and Penzance; Bristol Temple Meads — Birmingham New Street, Manchester, York, Newcastle, Edinburgh, Dundee and Aberdeen; Reading — Oxford, Birmingham New Street, Southampton Central and Bournemouth	2000–01
Class 221		DEMU	125	201	4 or 5	22	CrossCountry	Bristol Temple Meads — Exeter, Paignton, Plymouth and Penzance; Bristol Temple Meads — Birmingham New Street, Manchester, York, Newcastle, Edinburgh, Dundee and Aberdeen; Reading — Oxford, Birmingham New Street, Southampton Central and Bournemouth	2000–01
Class 800		Bi-Mode Multiple Unit	140	225	5	36	Great Western Railway	London Paddington to: – Oxford, Bedwyn, Worcester Shrub Hill, Great Malvern, Hereford; – Cardiff Central, Swansea, Carmarthen; – Bristol Temple Meads, Weston-super-Mare; – Cheltenham Spa, Taunton, Paignton	2014–18
Class 800		Bi-Mode Multiple Unit	140	225	9	21	Great Western Railway	London Paddington to: – Oxford, Bedwyn, Worcester Shrub Hill, Great Malvern, Hereford; – Cardiff Central, Swansea, Carmarthen; – Bristol Temple Meads, Weston-super-Mare; – Cheltenham Spa, Taunton, Paignton	2014–18
Class 802		Bi-Mode Multiple Unit	140	225	5	22	Great Western Railway	London Paddington to: – Exeter St Davids, Plymouth, Penzance; – Oxford, Bedwyn, Worcester Shrub Hill, Great Malvern, Hereford	2017–20
Class 802		Bi-Mode Multiple Unit	140	225	9	14	Great Western Railway	London Paddington to: – Exeter St Davids, Plymouth, Penzance; – Oxford, Bedwyn, Worcester Shrub Hill, Great Malvern, Hereford	2017–20

=== Sleeper trains ===
Class	Image	Type	Top speed		Number	Operator	Routes	Built
Class	Image	Type	mph	km/h	Number	Operator	Routes	Built
Class 57		Diesel locomotive	95	152	4	Great Western Railway	London Paddington to Penzance (The Night Riviera)	1998–2004
Mark 3		Passenger coach	125	200	18	Great Western Railway	London Paddington to Penzance (The Night Riviera)	1975–1988

== Notes ==
The reference for the route map diagram is:- Jowett, Alan (March 1989). Jowett's Railway Atlas of Great Britain and Ireland: From Pre-Grouping to the Present Day (1st ed.). Sparkford: Patrick Stephens Ltd. pp. 113, 115a, 116, 118b, 118d, 120, 124–25. ISBN 978-1-85260-086-0. OCLC 22311137.

== See also ==
- East Coast Main Line
- Highland Main Line
- Midland Main Line
- West Coast Main Line
