= Bath Spa railway station =

British railway station in Bath, England

Bath Spa
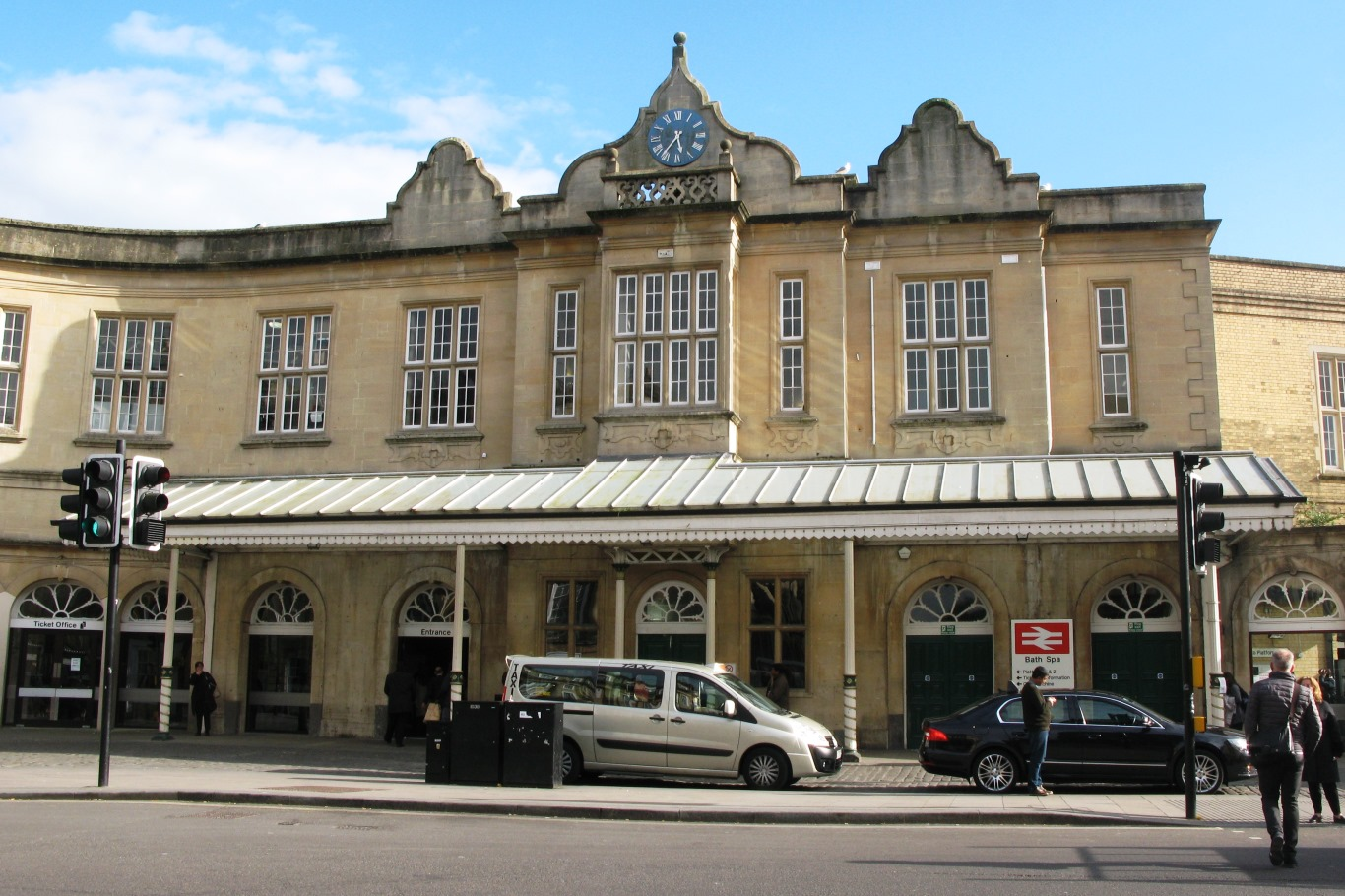
- Main buildings seen from Dorchester Street before the central pediment and clock was removed in 2022

General information
- Location: Bath, Bath and North East Somerset; England
- Coordinates: 51.3775°N 2.3564°W
- Grid reference: ST752643
- Manager: Great Western Railway
- Platforms: 2

Other information
- Station code: BTH
- Classification: DfT category C1

History
- Original company: Great Western Railway
- Pre-grouping: Great Western Railway
- Post-grouping: Great Western Railway

Key dates
- 31 August 1840: Opened as Bath
- 1949: Renamed Bath Spa

Passengers
- 2021/22: ▲4.086 million
- Interchange: ▲0.132 million
- 2022/23: ▲5.468 million
- Interchange: ▲0.173 million
- 2023/24: ▲6.118 million
- Interchange: ▲0.194 million
- 2024/25: ▲6.511 million
- Interchange: ▲0.207 million
- 2025/26: ▲6.818 million
- Interchange: ▲0.229 million

Listed Building – Grade II*
- Official name: Bath Spa Station
- Designated: 11 August 1972
- Reference no.: 1395629
Location
Notes
- Passenger statistics from the Office of Rail and Road

Bath Spa railway station is the principal station serving the city of Bath in Somerset, England. It is on the Great Western Main Line, 106 miles 71 chains (106.89 mi; 172.0 km) down the line from the zero point at London Paddington between Chippenham to the east and Oldfield Park to the west. It is the busiest station in Somerset, and the second-busiest station in South West England after Bristol Temple Meads.

The station is managed by Great Western Railway, which operates all trains at this station.

== History ==
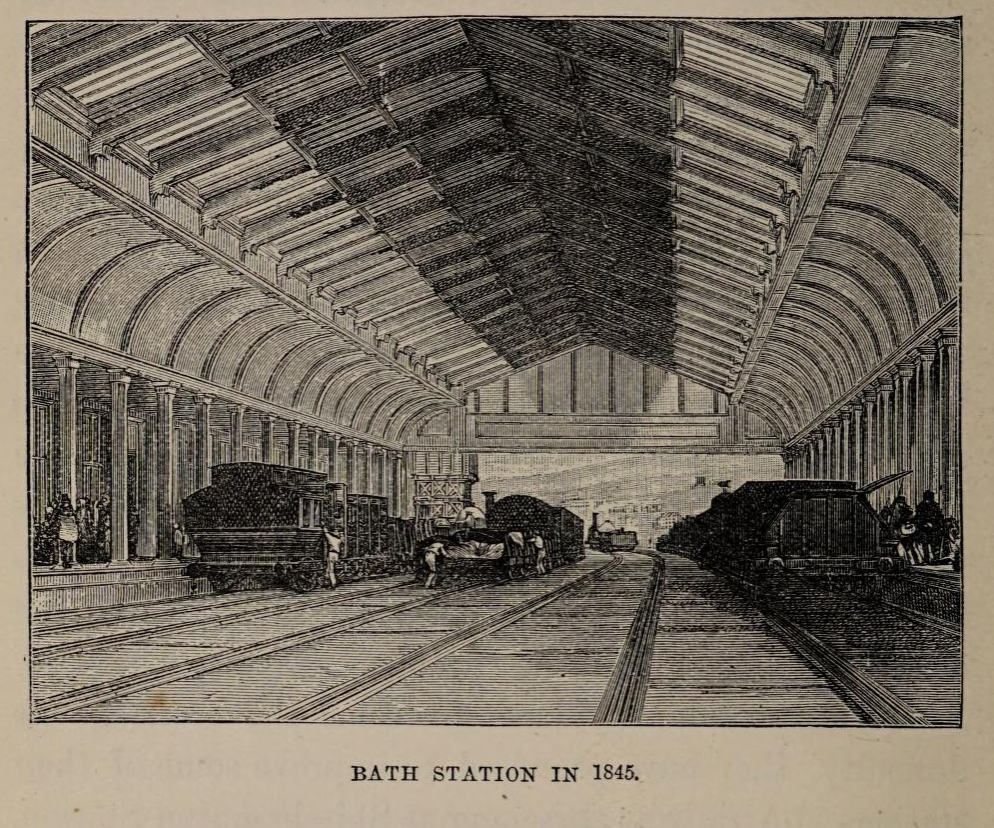
Bath station in 1845, showing the original roof

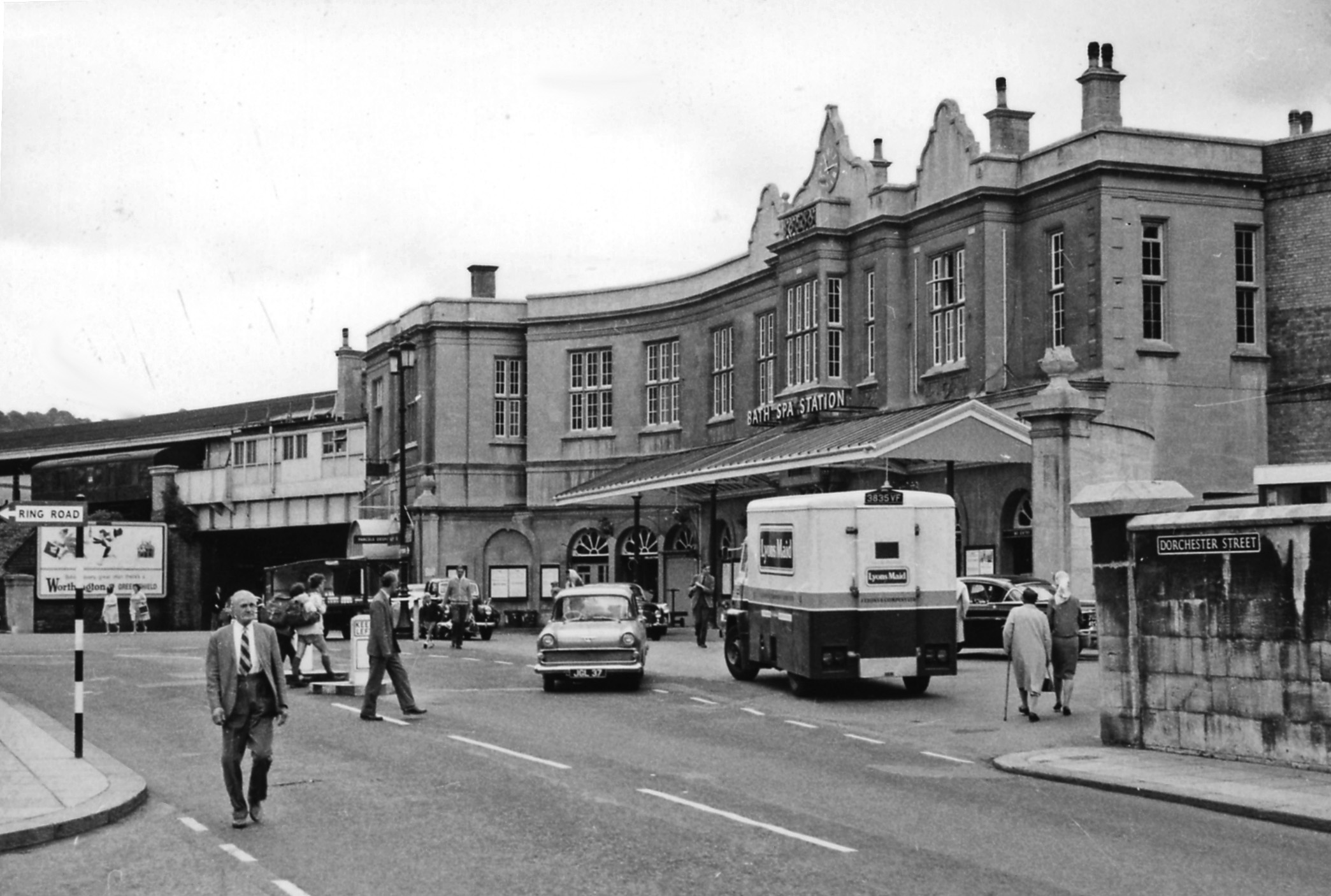
Bath Spa station in 1962

The station was built for the Great Western Railway (GWR) by Isambard Kingdom Brunel and is now a Grade II* listed building. It is in an asymmetrical Tudor style with curving gables on the north bank of the Avon where the line curves across from the southern bank to the station and then back again. Opened on 31 August 1840, the station was originally named 'Bath'. It was renamed 'Bath Spa' in 1949 to distinguish it from Bath Green Park station, although that station did not have its own name altered from just 'Bath' until 1951.

The adjacent Royal Station Hotel was constructed by the GWR and opened five years after the station. It was designed as a luxury hotel whose guests included Queen Victoria. The hotel's first floor originally had a direct link to the station platforms via a footbridge.

The station has wide spacing between the platforms because it was built with two broad gauge carriage sidings between the platform lines. The original station featured a hammerbeam roof that covered the area between the platforms, similar to that which still exists at Bristol Temple Meads. However, Bath's roof was removed in 1897 when the station was remodelled with longer platforms.

A three-track goods shed was built immediately west of the station, to the north of the main track. In 1877, a goods depot was built about 1,600 feet (500 m) to the west at Westmoreland and the goods shed was demolished for the station remodelling in 1897.

A footbridge leads from the rear of the station across the Avon, allowing direct access to the Widcombe area of the city. Open in 1862, the bridge was originally made from wood and tolled (known locally as Halfpenny Bridge). However, this original structure collapsed disastrously in 1877 with a number of deaths, and the present steel girder bridge was erected as a replacement later that same year.

=== Redevelopment ===
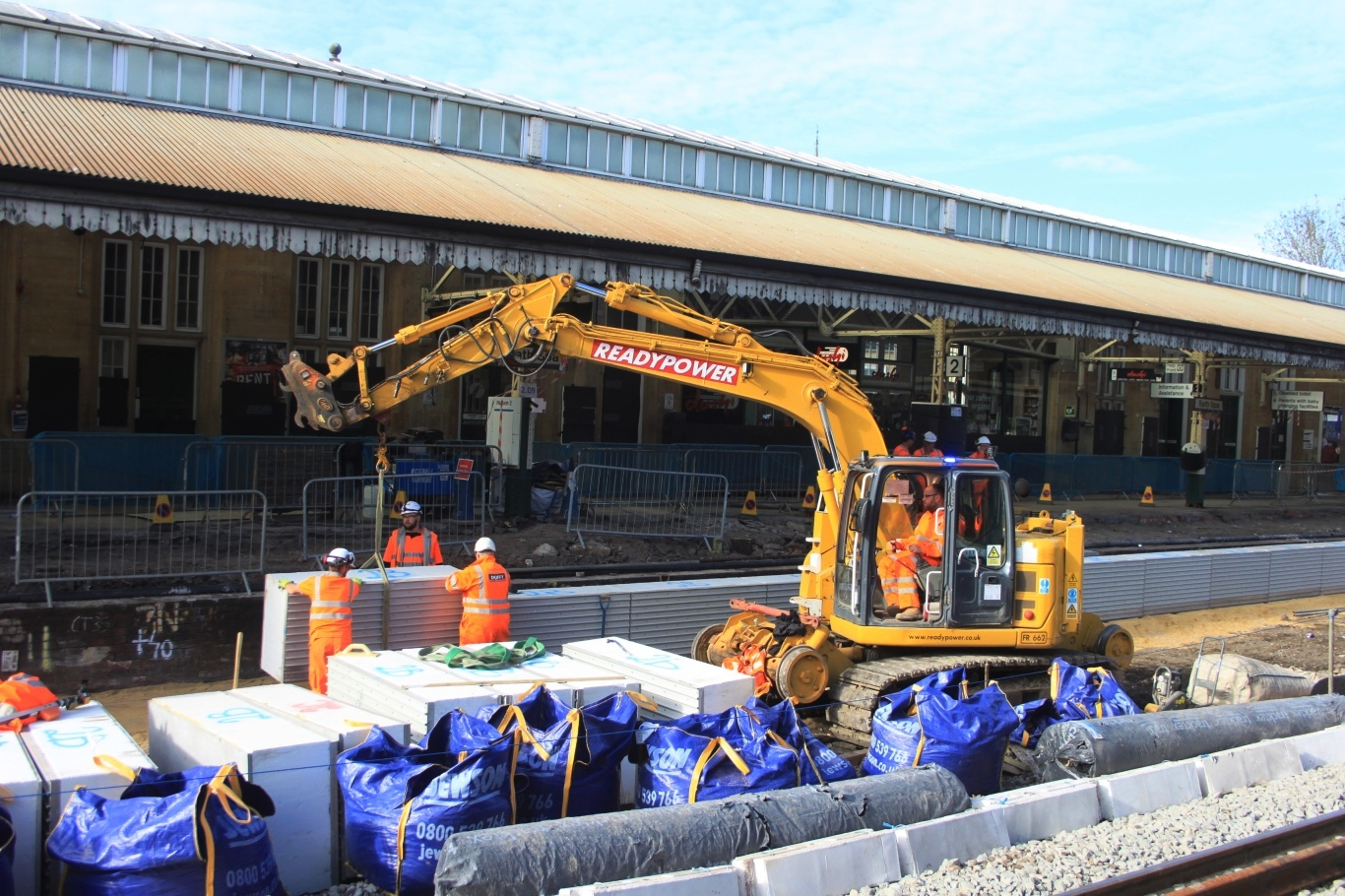
Rebuilding the platforms in 2017

Since privatisation Great Western Railway (originally known as First Great Western) has managed Bath Spa. In 2005 the company obtained listed building consent for alterations to the building, including the installation of lifts to the platforms. Ticket barriers have also been installed.

Other developments started in 2011 to integrate the station with the new Bath bus station and SouthGate shopping centre, and redevelop some of the station car park and northern ramp into a restaurant complex at a cost of £12 million. There are plans to adapt some arches at the station to encourage retail use.

Bath Spa won awards for Best Medium-Sized Station and Overall Best Station at the 2013 International Station Awards.

The station was modified in April 2017 for the Great Western Main Line electrification project. Because of its listed status, the platform canopies could not be cut back to fit overhead electrification equipment on the alignment and so the platforms were widened so that future electrification masts could be installed between the tracks. (Electrification through the station was deferred in November 2016). The work provided a larger circulation area and reduced the gap between train and platform.

Safety concerns about the Dutch gable in 2022 resulted in the temporary removal of the clock above the main entrance. As of April 2026 it has yet to be restored.

== Other stations in Bath ==
The only other open station in Bath is Oldfield Park, a small commuter station in a western suburb, with services to Bristol Temple Meads and Westbury.

Former stations now closed in Bath were Green Park (the Midland terminus, whose overall roof and primary buildings survive, and which for part of its life was named "Bath Queen Square"), Bathampton and Weston (a suburban station on the Midland line which closed in 1953). Westmoreland Road was a GWR goods station. Twerton-on-Avon, and Hampton Row Halt, both on the GWR route, closed in 1917 as a World War I economy measure.

== Services ==
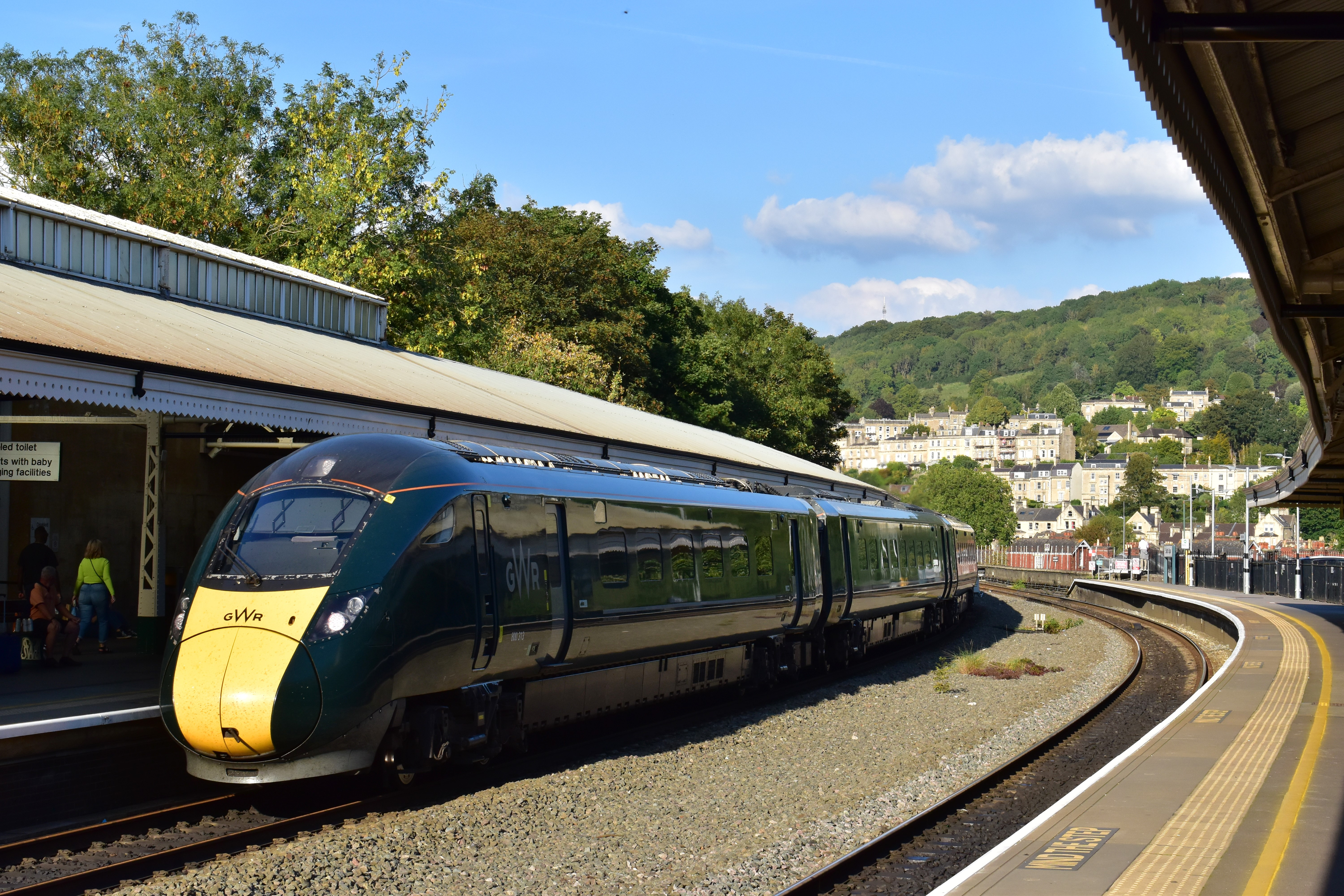
A Class 800 at Bath Spa on a service towards Bristol Temple Meads

All services at Bath Spa are operated by Great Western Railway. They provide services between London Paddington and Bristol Temple Meads at a frequency of 2 trains per hour (1 train per hour on Sundays). These give a service from Bath to Chippenham, Swindon and Reading. 1 train every 2 hours extends beyond Bristol to Weston-super-Mare, and 3 trains a day extend to Taunton or Penzance.

Between Bristol Temple Meads and Westbury a further 3 trains per hour are provided, calling at many of the smaller stations along the route. Of these trains, 1 train per hour runs between Cardiff Central and Portsmouth Harbour, 1 train per hour runs from Bristol Temple Meads to Salisbury and 1 train per hours runs from Gloucester to Westbury, with 1 train per 2 hours extending to Weymouth.

Preceding station	National Rail	Following station
Bristol Temple Meads	Great Western Railway (Great Western Main Line)	Chippenham
Oldfield Park	Great Western Railway (Wessex Main Line and Heart of Wessex Line)	Freshford

== Civil engineering ==
The Great Western Main Line crosses the Avon at the east end of the station, then crosses it again to the west of the station before continuing along a viaduct. Both bridges and the viaduct were originally designed by Brunel, and all are listed buildings.

=== St James's Bridge ===
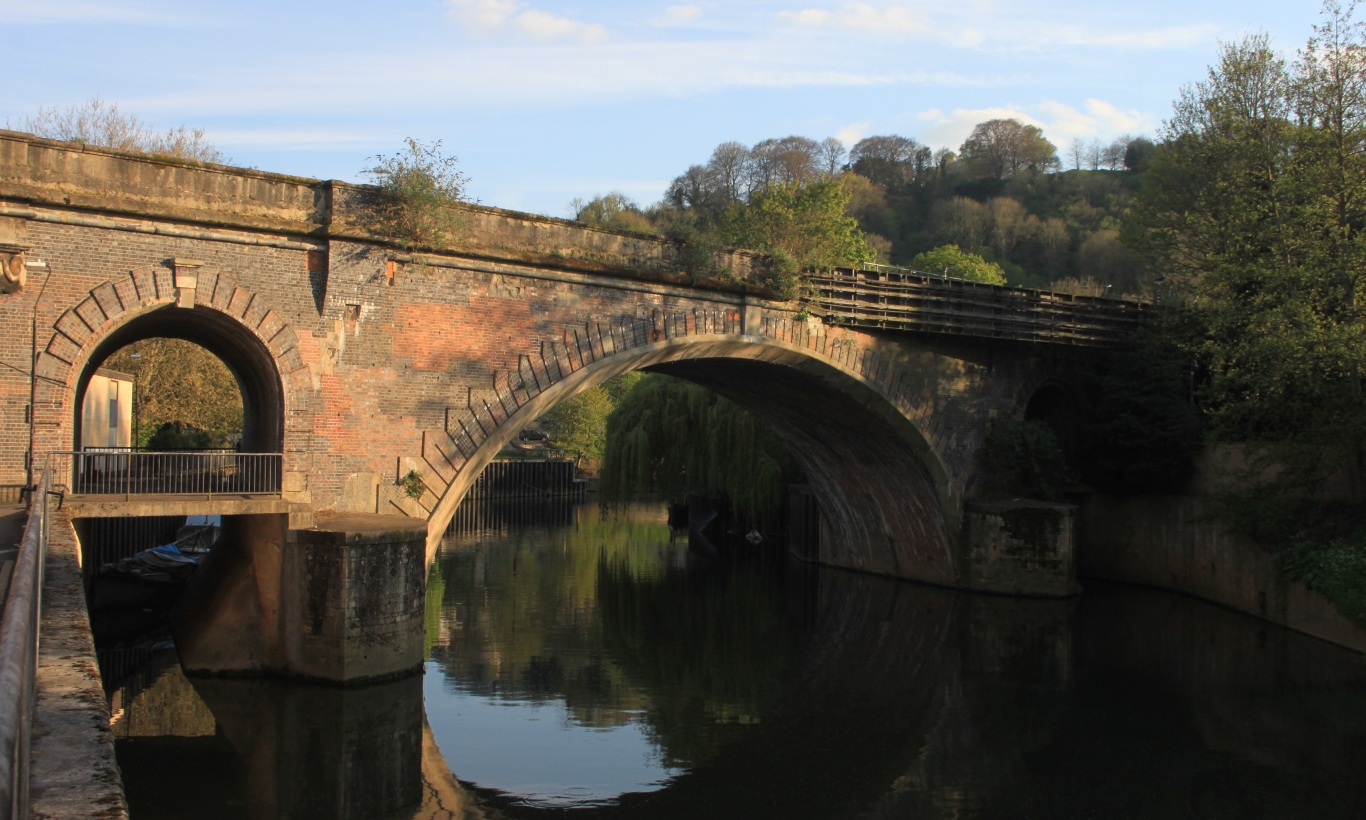
North side of the bridge

St James's Railway Bridge
- Coordinates: 51.3783°N 2.3549°W
- Carries: Great Western Main Line
- Crosses: River Avon

Characteristics
- Longest span: 89 ft (27 m)

History
- Architect: Brunel
- Opened: c. 1840

Statistics

Listed Building – Grade II
- Official name: ST JAMES'S RAILWAY BRIDGE
- Designated: 5 August 1975
- Reference no.: 1395151

The eastern bridge is an elliptical stone arch, with a smaller circular arch either side. It was repaired in brick in 1927. Although not referred to as such, it is a skew bridge, crossing the river at about 45 degrees; it "embodies Brunel's ability to find elegant architectural solutions to engineering challenges."

=== Skew Bridge ===
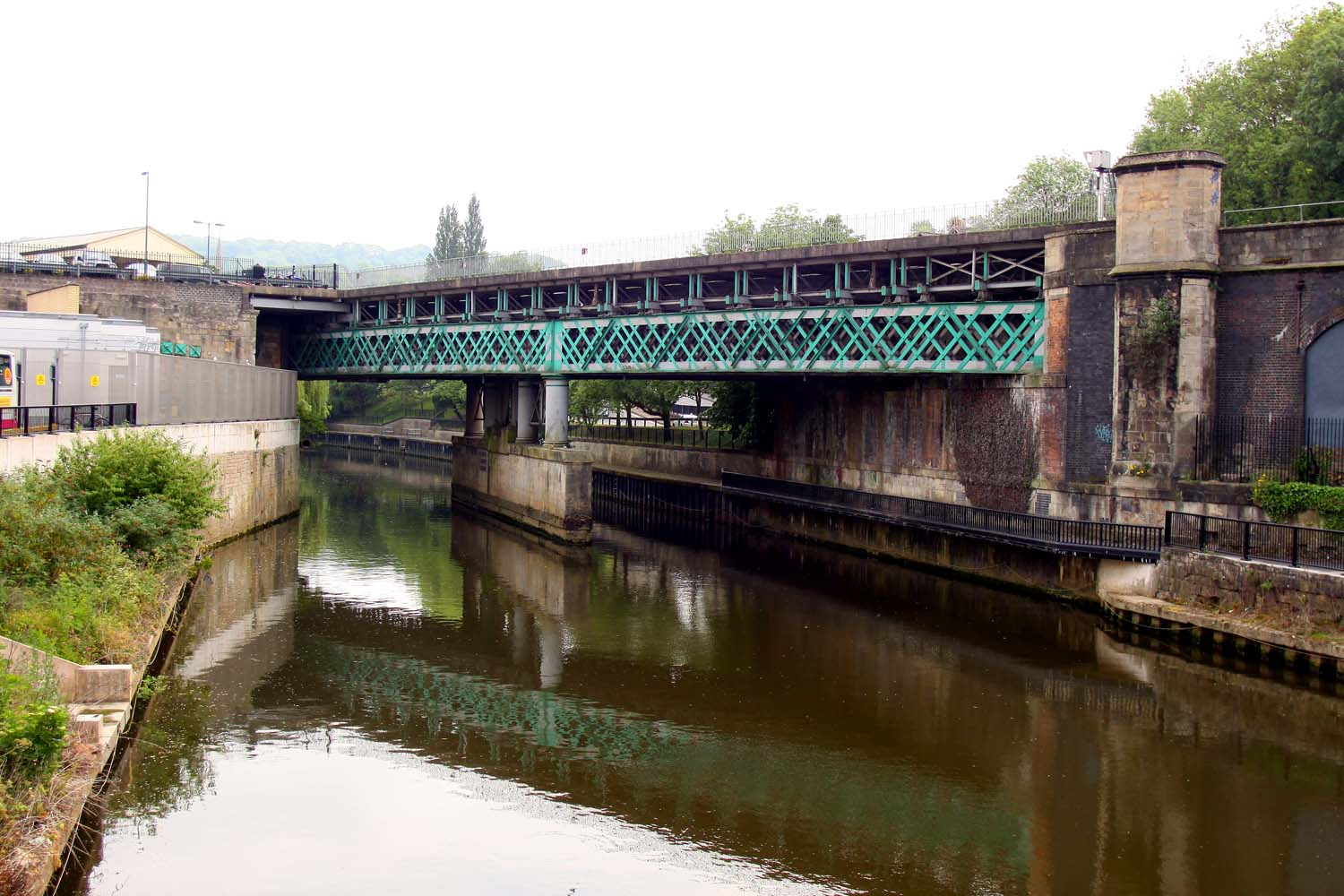
North side of bridge; station to the left

Skew Bridge
- Coordinates: 51.3772°N 2.3583°W
- Carries: Great Western Main Line
- Crosses: River Avon

Characteristics
- Material: Stone abutments/pier, with: 1840: Laminated timber; 1878: Steel, cast & wrought iron
- First section length: 80.0 ft (24.38 m)
- Second section length: 80.0 ft (24.38 m)

History
- Designer: Brunel; 1878: Wakefield Simpson
- Built: 1840
- Rebuilt: 1878

Statistics

Listed Building – Grade II
- Official name: SKEW BRIDGE AND ASSOCIATED CANTILEVERED WALKWAY IMMEDIATELY TO THE WEST OF BATH SPA STATION
- Designated: 21 September 2000
- Reference no.: 1395344

Brunel originally intended the Skew Bridge over the Avon to be constructed of cast iron, but he was unable to let the contract for this. Instead, he designed each arch to consist of six arches of laminated timber. Each arch had five laminations of 6-inch-thick (15 cm) Baltic pine, bent to shape and held together with bolts and straps of iron. Under the arches, a walkway allowed pedestrians to pass along the south bank of the river; railings were added to the walkway during the 1878 rebuilding.

In 1878, Wakefield Simpson replaced the timber arches with two wrought iron truss spans, supported by iron cylinders which rest on the original piers and abutments. The bridge was strengthened in the 1960s with additional steel supports and superstructure, to allow it to carry the extended platforms of Bath Station.

=== St James' Viaduct ===
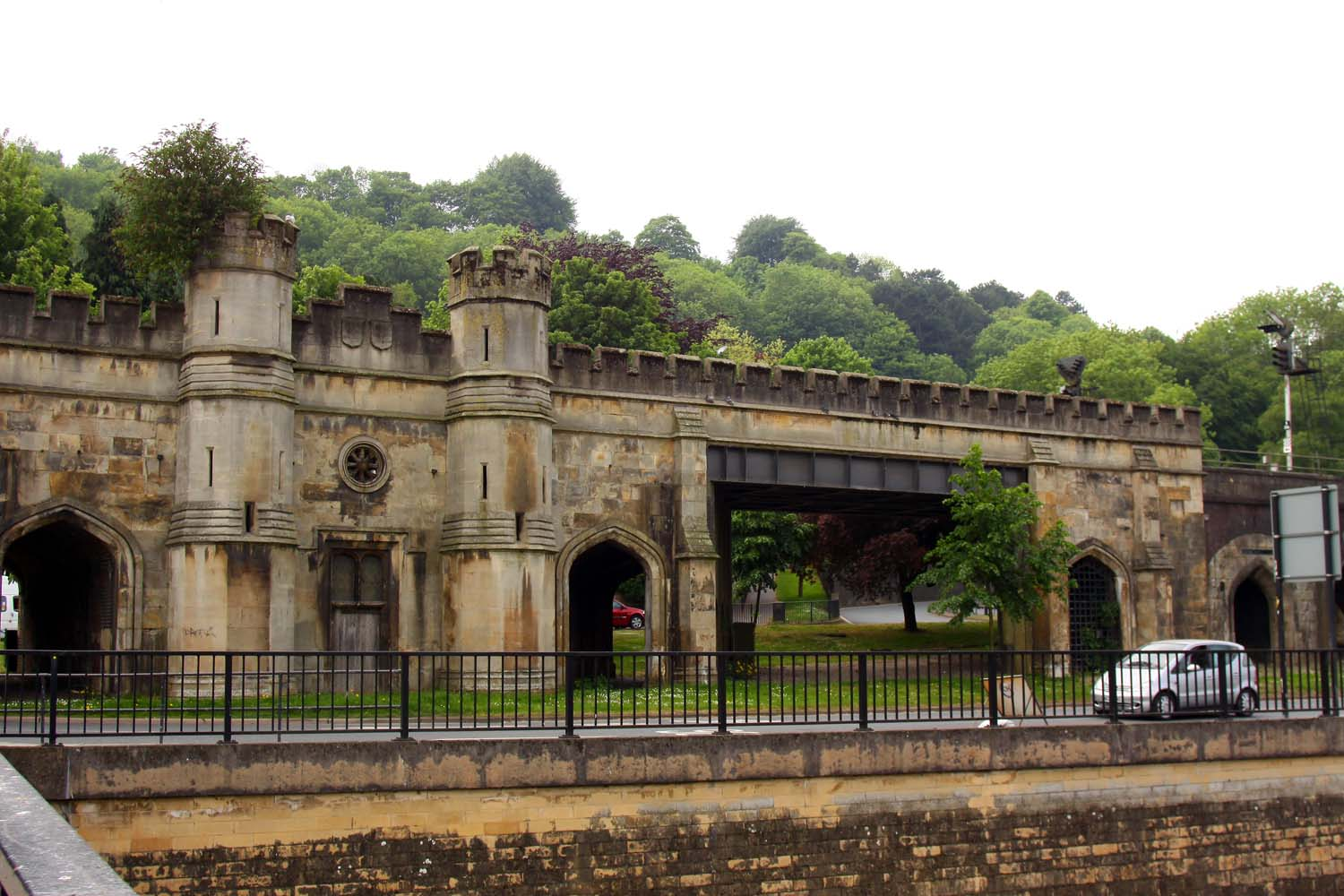
North side of the viaduct

St James' Viaduct
- Coordinates: 51.3772°N 2.3600°W
- Carries: Great Western Main Line
- Crosses: Lower Bristol Road
- Other name(s): Holloway Viaduct, Southgate Viaduct

Characteristics
- Material: Limestone, brick, steel

History
- Architect: Brunel
- Built: 1840
- Opened: 21 Aug 1840
- Rebuilt: 1911, 1961

Statistics

Listed Building – Grade II*
- Official name: St James' Viaduct (MLN110705)
- Designated: 11 August 1972
- Reference no.: 1395135

After the Skew Bridge, the line continues towards Bristol over St James' Viaduct, a "castellated Gothic fantasy" with pointed arches and arrow slots on the northern (Bath-facing) side; the southern side is plainer. There are seventeen arches in total; the spans crossing Wells Road and Lower Bristol Road were rebuilt in steel in 1911–12 as locomotives had become heavier; the former span was again rebuilt in 1961–62.
