= Bath Assembly Rooms =

Grade I listed building in Bath, England

Assembly Rooms
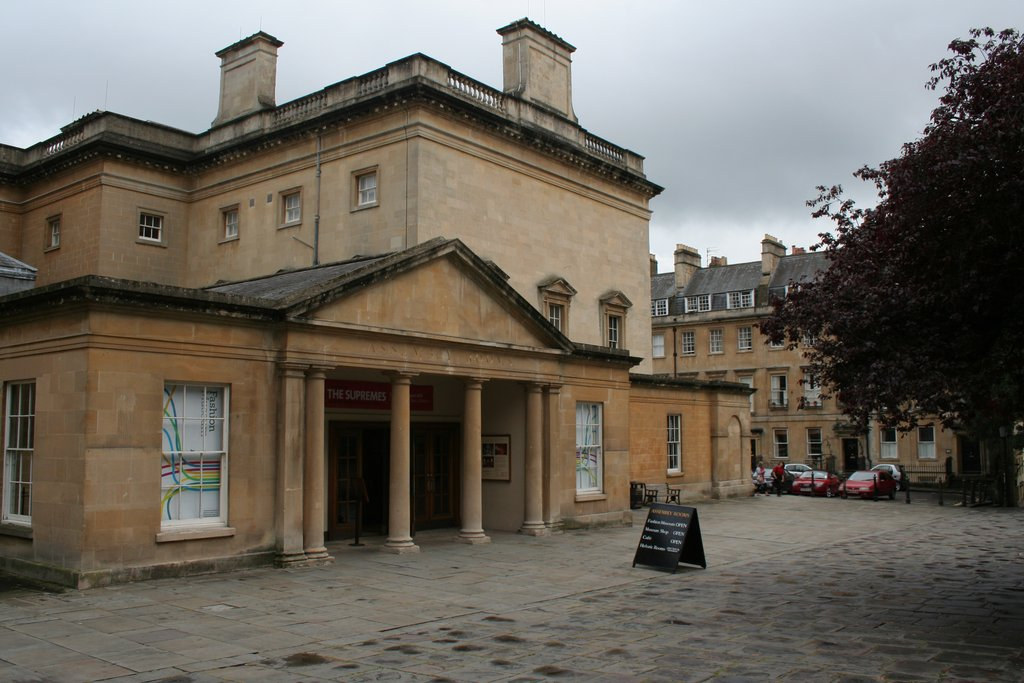
- The Assembly Rooms

- Location within Somerset
- 51°23′10″N 2°21′44″W
- Location: Bath, England

History
- Built: 1771

Site notes
- Architect: John Wood, the Younger
- Architectural style: Georgian
- Restored: 1963
- Restored by: Sir Albert Richardson
- Owner: National Trust

Listed Building – Grade I
- Official name: Assembly Rooms
- Designated: 12 June 1950
- Reference no.: 1394144

The Bath Assembly Rooms, designed by John Wood, the Younger in 1769, are a set of assembly rooms located in the heart of the World Heritage City of Bath in England which are now open to the public as a visitor attraction. They are designated as a Grade I listed building.

During the Georgian era Bath became fashionable, and the architects John Wood, the Elder, and his son laid out new areas of housing for residents and visitors. Assembly rooms had been built early in the 18th century, but a new venue for balls, concerts and gambling was envisaged in the area between Queen Square, The Circus and the Royal Crescent. Robert Adam submitted a proposal that was rejected as too expensive. John Wood, the Younger raised funding through a tontine, and construction started in 1769. The new or upper assembly rooms opened with a grand ball in 1771 and became the hub of fashionable society, being frequented by Jane Austen and Charles Dickens, along with the nobility of the time.

The building, made of Bath stone, is arranged in a U shape. There are four main function rooms in the complex: the 100-foot-long (30 m) ballroom—the largest Georgian interior in Bath; the tea room; the card room; and the octagon. The rooms have Whitefriars crystal chandeliers and are decorated with fine art.

In the 20th century, they were used as a cinema, and in 1931, were taken over by the Society for the Protection of Ancient Buildings and restored. They were bombed and burnt out during the Second World War, with restoration undertaken by Sir Albert Richardson before reopening in 1963. They are now owned and operated by the National Trust and were operated by Bath and North East Somerset Council for public functions until March 2023. The basement of the building provided a home to the Fashion Museum but this closed in October 2022 after a break clause in the lease was enacted. The exhibits have been placed into storage as the Museum seeks funding for a permanent new home within the city.

== History ==
Several areas of Bath had undergone development during the Stuart period; development increased during Georgian times, however, in response to the increasing number of visitors to the spa and resort town who required accommodation. The architects John Wood, the Elder and his son John Wood, the Younger laid out the new quarters in streets and squares, the identical façades of which gave an impression of palatial scale and classical decorum. Much of the creamy honey-coloured Bath stone used for construction throughout the city was obtained from the limestone Combe Down and Bathampton Down Mines owned by Ralph Allen (1694–1764).

The development at this time largely consisted of new residential areas located away from the old city centre. The elder John Wood designed Queen Square, the Circus, and Gay Street in 1735, which would be completed by the younger John Wood. Queen Square was the first speculative development by the elder John Wood, who lived in one of the houses. The Circus consists of three long, curved terraces that form a circular theatre intended for civic functions and games and inspired by the Colosseum in Rome. Finally, the elder Wood also designed and developed Gay Street which links the two; the buildings on Gay Street are now largely Grade I listed buildings.

The most spectacular of Bath's terraces is the Royal Crescent, designed by the younger John Wood, and built between 1767 and 1774.

The heart of the Georgian city was Wood's Pump Room, which, together with its associated Lower Assembly Rooms, was designed by Thomas Baldwin, a local builder responsible for many other buildings in the city, including the terraces in Argyle Street and the Guildhall, The Lower Assembly Rooms consisted of two buildings. The first built in 1708 for Thomas Harrison overlooking Parade Gardens between North Parade and Bath Abbey. A large ballroom was added in 1720, with further enlargement in 1749 and 1810 when it became known as The Kingston Assembly Rooms. In 1728, another building, known as Lindsey's Assembly Rooms, was constructed, lasting until demolition around 1820 for the building of York Street. Harrison's Lower Assembly Rooms were devastated by a fire in December 1820 and rebuilt, lasting until demolition in 1933 for road improvements on the site now known as "Bog Island".

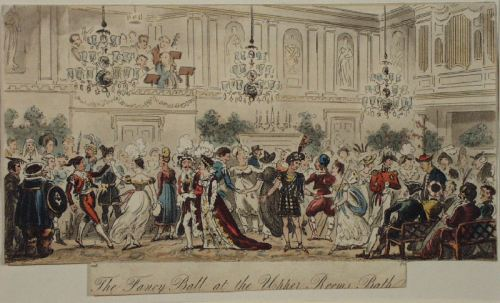
Fancy Dress Ball at the Bath Assembly Rooms by Thomas Rowlandson

In around 1770, the neoclassical architect Robert Adam designed Pulteney Bridge, a three-arched bridge spanning the River Avon. He used as his prototype an original, but unused, design by Andrea Palladio for the Rialto Bridge in Venice. Adam also submitted plans for the new Assembly Rooms but these were rejected as too costly. John Wood, the Younger raised funding for the construction of the Assembly Rooms by the use of a Tontine, an investment plan that is named after the Neapolitan banker Lorenzo de Tonti, who is credited with inventing it in France in 1653. It combines features of a group annuity and a lottery. Each subscriber pays an agreed sum into the fund, and thereafter receives an annuity. As members die, their shares devolve to the other participants, and so the value of each annuity increases. On the death of the last member, the scheme is wound up. Construction started in 1769 and was completed in 1771, when a grand opening was held.

The Assembly Rooms formed the hub of fashionable Georgian society in the city, the venue being described as "the most noble and elegant of any in the kingdom". They were originally known as the Upper Rooms as there was also a lower assembly room in the city, which closed soon after the Upper Rooms opened. They served the newly built fashionable area which included the Circus, Queen Square and the Royal Crescent.

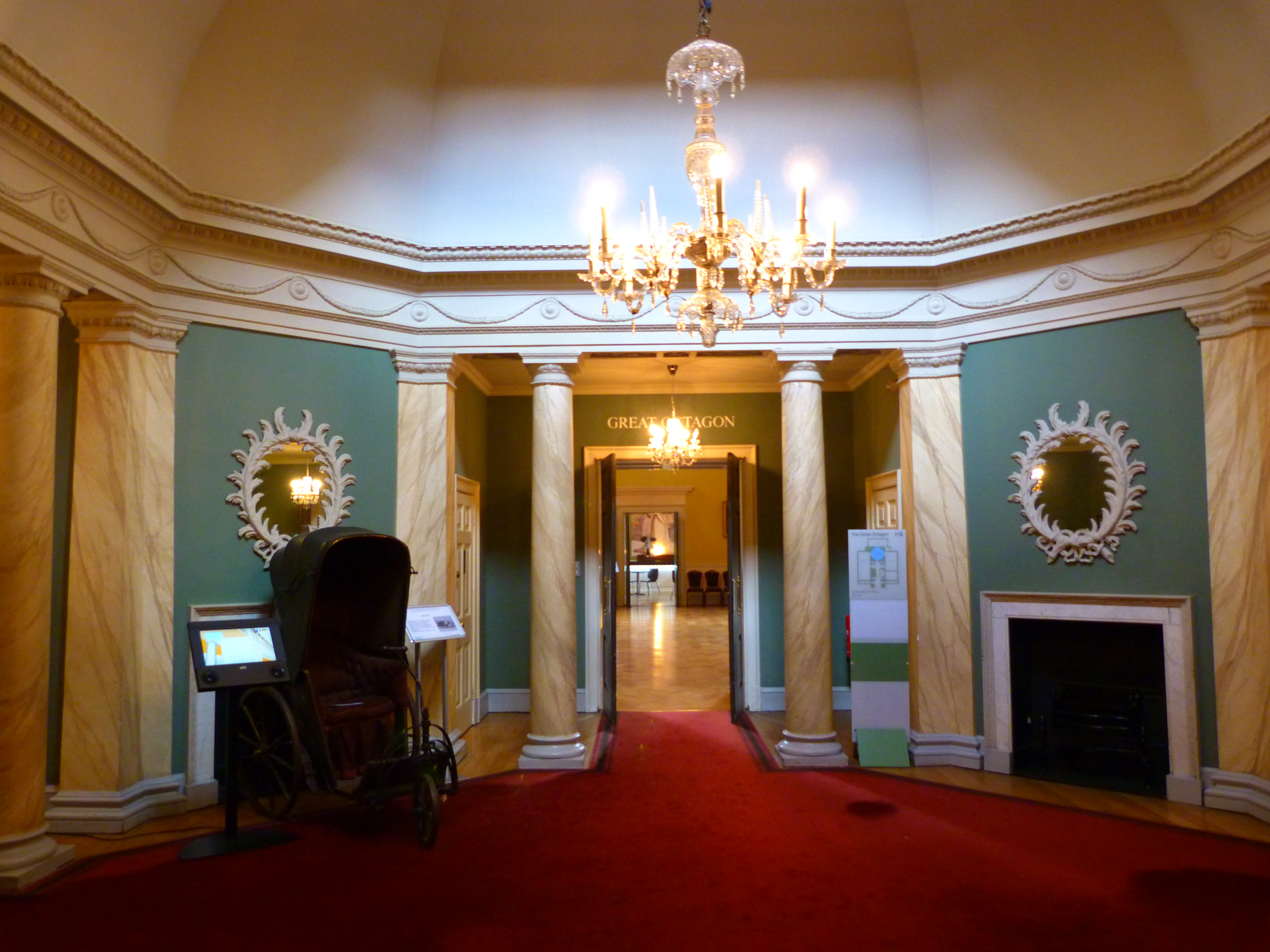
Entrance into the Octagon Room

People would gather in the rooms in the evening for balls and other public functions, or simply to play cards. Mothers and chaperones bringing their daughters to Bath for the social season, hoping to marry them off to a suitable husband, would take their charge to such events where, very quickly, one might meet all the eligible men currently in the City. At one concert in 1779, attended by around 800 ladies and gentlemen, 60 members of the nobility were present. During the season, which ran from October to June, at least two balls a week were held, in addition to a range of concerts and other events. Scenes such as this feature in the novels of Jane Austen, who lived in Bath with her parents and sister from 1801 to 1805. Her two novels set in Bath, Northanger Abbey and Persuasion, were published in 1818 and both mention the Assembly Rooms:

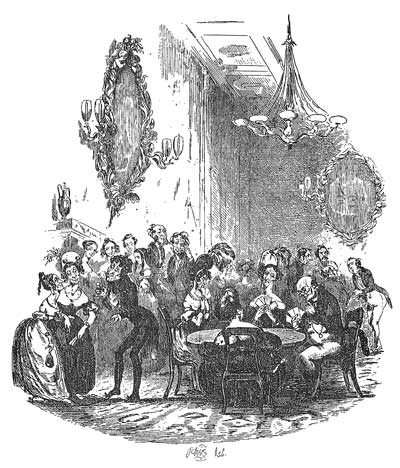
1837 Steel engraving, probably by Hablot Knight Browne, "The Card-room at Bath" used in The Pickwick Papers

Mrs Allen was so long in dressing, that they did not enter the ball-room till late. The season was full, the room crowded, and the two ladies squeezed in as well as they could. As for Mr Allen, he repaired directly to the card-room, and left them to enjoy a mob by themselves.

— Jane Austen, Northanger Abbey

Sir Walter, his two daughters, and Mrs Clay, were the earliest of all their party at the rooms in the evening; and as Lady Dalrymple must be waited for, they took their station by one of the fires in the Octagon Room.

— Jane Austen, Persuasion (Chapter 20)

Charles Dickens also visited Bath on several occasions. He gave public readings in the Assembly Rooms and mentions them in The Pickwick Papers (published in 1837):

In the ball-room, the long card-room, the octagonal card-room, the staircases, and the passages, the hum of many voices, and the sound of many feet, were perfectly bewildering. Dresses rustled, feathers waved, lights shone, and jewels sparkled. There was the music—not of the quadrille band, for it had not yet commenced; but the music of soft tiny footsteps, with now and then a clear merry laugh—low and gentle, but very pleasant to hear in a female voice, whether in Bath or elsewhere.

— Charles Dickens, The Pickwick Papers

George Bridgetower, an Afro-Polish-born virtuoso violinist, made his debut at the Assembly Rooms in 1789. Another young violinist, Thomas Linley the younger, played a series of concerts between 1771 and 1776. Many of the concerts during the late 18th and early 19th centuries were organised by Venanzio Rauzzini.

In the 20th century, several changes took place, with the Ballroom becoming a cinema, until the Society for the Protection of Ancient Buildings became the owners in 1931. The building was restored by A Mowbray Green in 1938, with Oliver Messel as the interior designer. During the Bath Blitz of 25/26 April 1942, one of the retaliatory raids on England by the Baedeker Blitz following the RAF's raid on Lübeck, the Assembly Rooms were bombed and burnt out inside. After the cessation of hostilities in Europe, they were restored by Sir Albert Richardson, with work being completed in 1963. The ballroom ceiling had to be repaired after it collapsed in 1989.

== Architecture ==
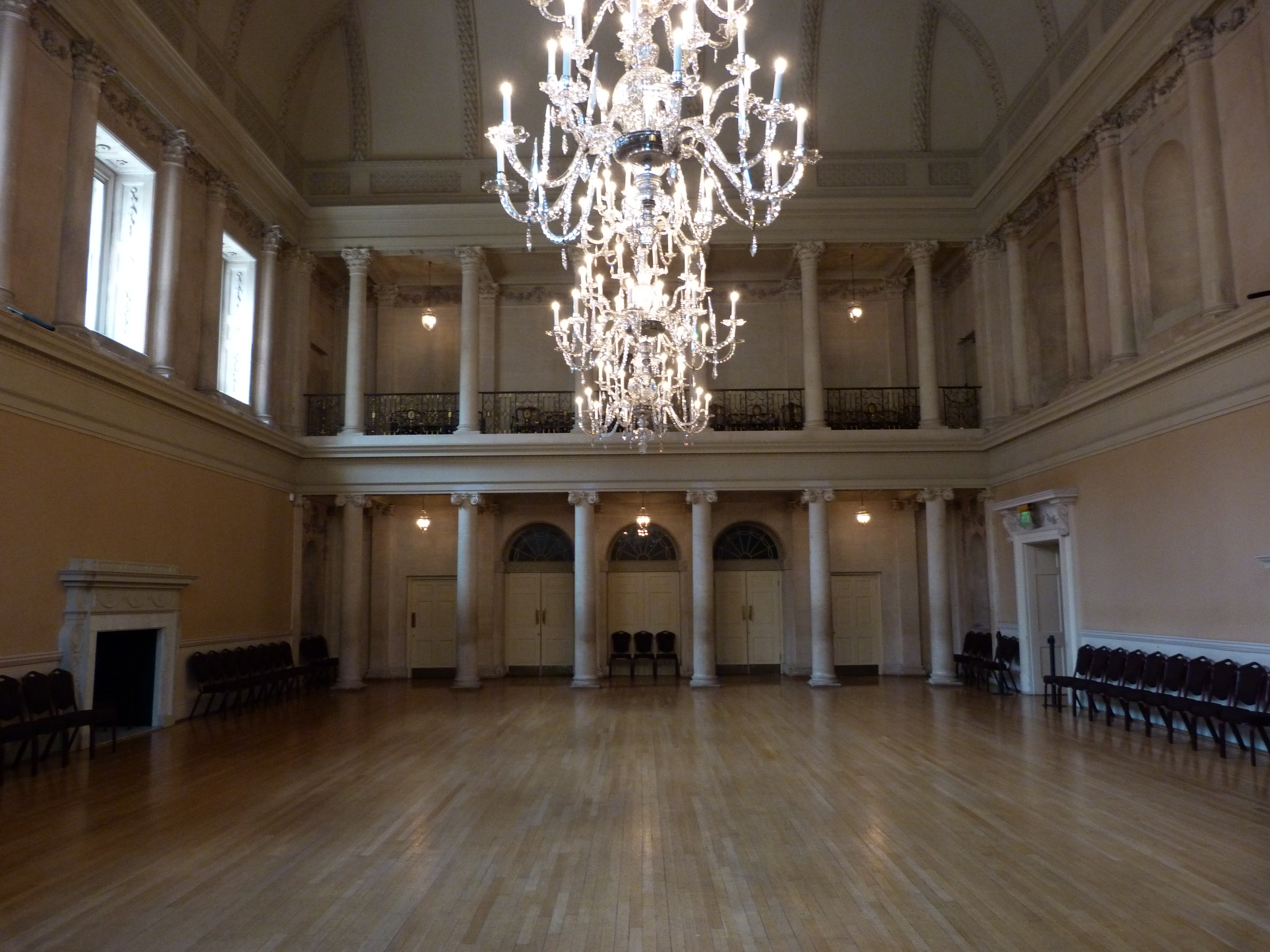
Three chandeliers adorning the Tea Room

The limestone building has a slate hipped roof. It is rectangular with a projecting doric portico entrance and an extension to the rear. The interior is laid out in a U shape, with the larger Ball Room and Tea Room along either side with the octagonal Card Room at the end. The rooms have Whitefriars crystal chandeliers and are decorated with pictures by Thomas Gainsborough, Allan Ramsay (artist), Edwin Long and William Hoare.

The Ballroom has five chandeliers and capacity for up to 500 people. It is over 100 feet (30 m) long and nearly 45 feet (14 m) wide. The ceiling is 42 feet (13 m) high. The Tea Room holds up to 250 people. It was the location for a banquet attended by Charles, Prince of Wales for the BBC television series the Great British Menu. It is 60 feet (18 m) long and 42 feet (13 m) wide. The Octagon is named for the shape of the room and has four fireplaces. It is 42 feet (13 m) across. It originally held an organ in the musicians gallery. In 1777, the Card Room was added.

Philip Thicknesse in his 1778 'New Bath Guide' admired the architecture of the New or Upper Rooms but thought that 'in spite of all these Advantages, we much doubt, whether it be true that the Upper Rooms shew Female Beauty so advantageously as the Lower.... We have examined too, with a Degree of particular Attention, some of the most Admired Beauties of the last and present season, at both the Rooms, and, as far as we could determine, they were either best pleased, or most beautiful, under the lower than the upper lights'.

== Current use ==
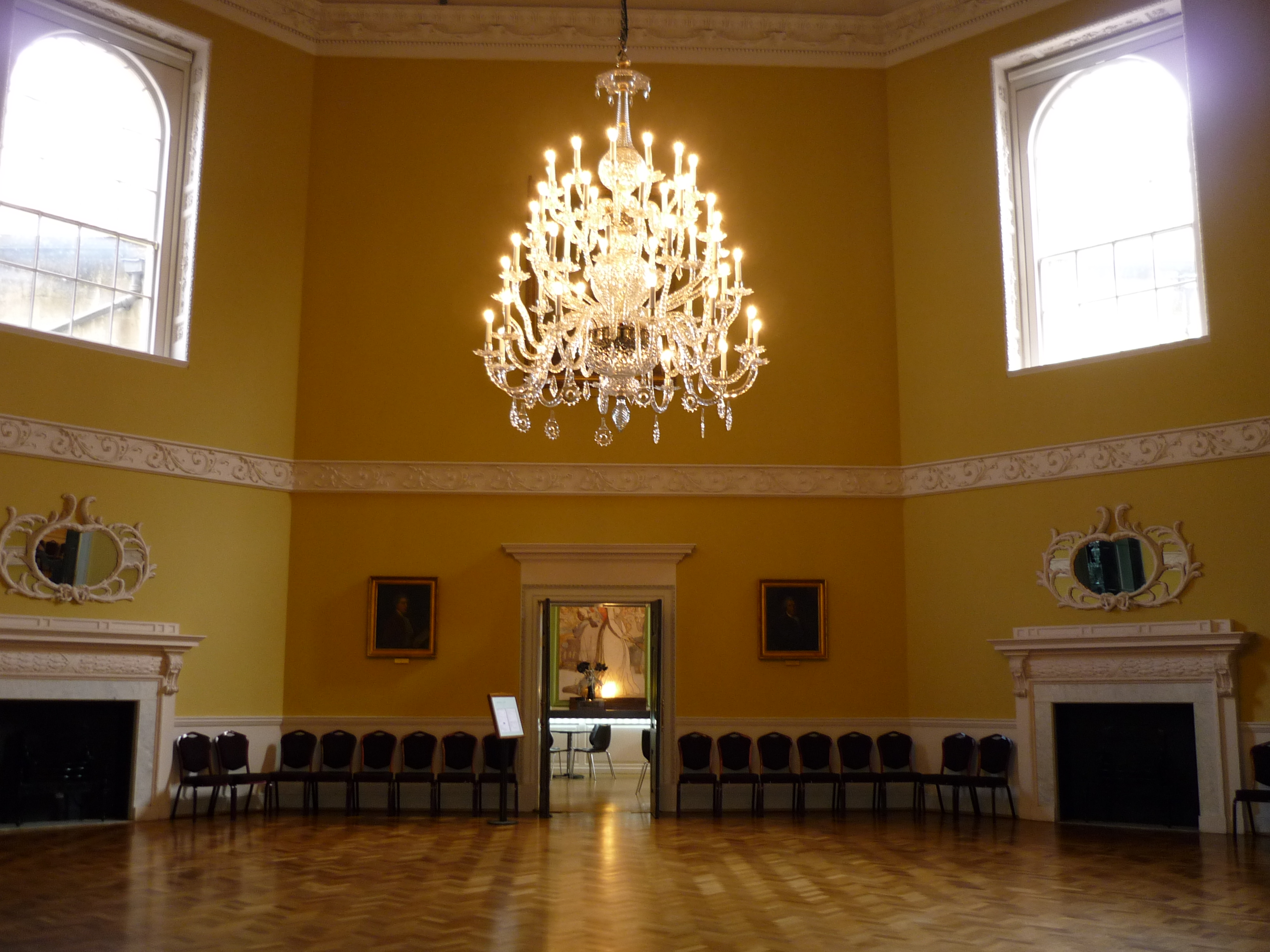
The Octagon Room, with a central chandelier

Today, the rooms are owned and operated by the National Trust. They are used currently used as a venue for partnership exhibitions and concerts, including ones that are part of the Bath International Music Festival.

The basement of the building provided a home to the Fashion Museum, which was known before 2007 as the Museum of Costume, until its closure in October 2022. The collection was started by Doris Langley Moore, who gave her collection to the city of Bath in 1963. It focuses on fashionable dress for men, women and children from the late 16th century to the present day and has more than 30,000 objects. The earliest pieces are embroidered shirts and gloves from about 1600.

The grandeur of the building make it a popular location for feature films and television series set in the Georgian period. The BBC have used it as a location for the filming of an adaptation of Northanger Abbey in 1986 and in 1995 Persuasion. The Assembly Rooms were also used as a location for several scenes in Bridgerton.

== See also ==
- List of National Trust properties in Somerset
