= Francis Hotel, Bath =

Hotel in Bath, England

Coordinates: 51°22′59″N 2°21′48″W

Francis Hotel
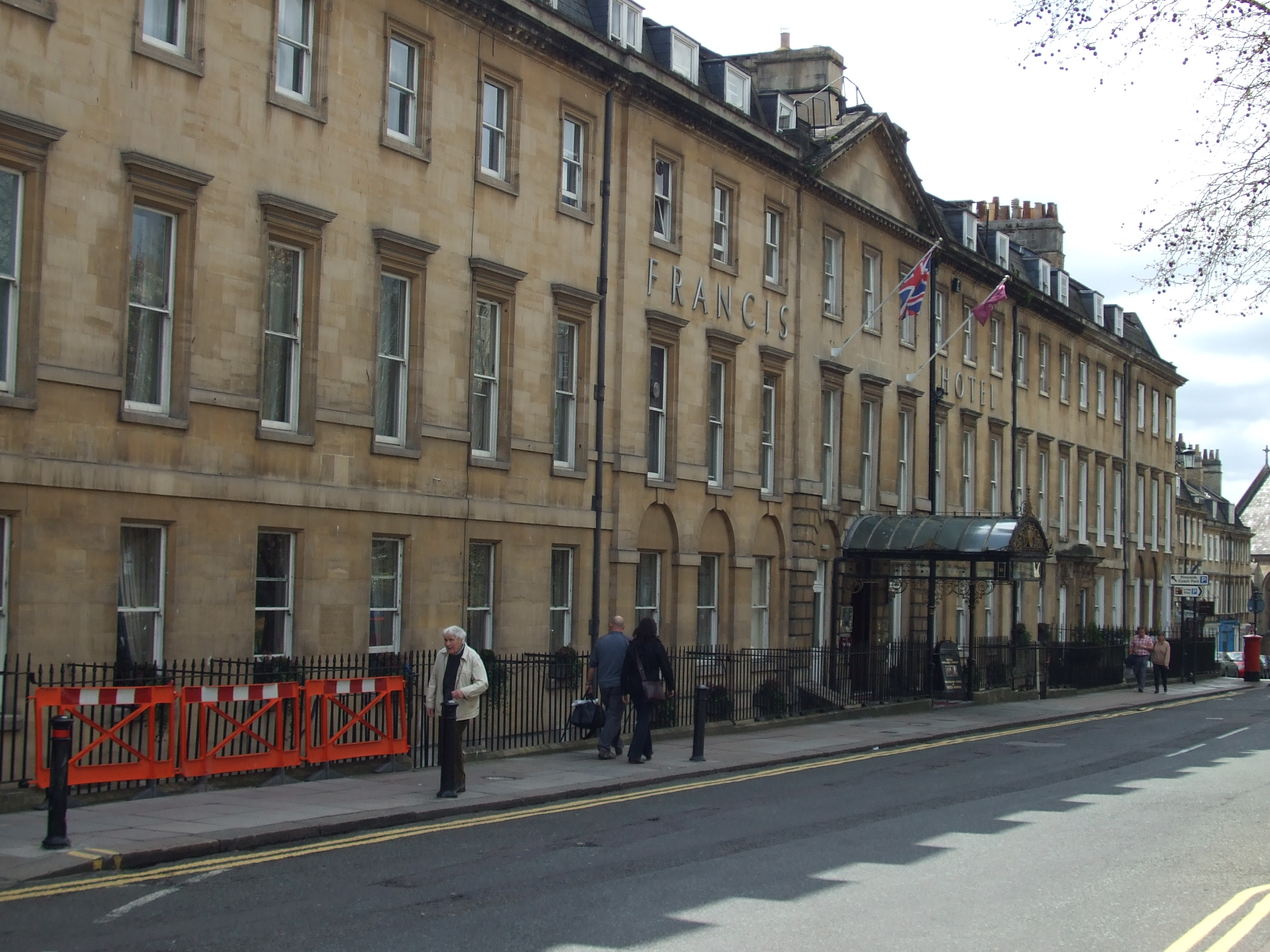
- South side of Queen Square, Bath, showing Francis Hotel
- Interactive map of the Francis Hotel area
- Hotel chain: Sutton Hotel Collection

General information
- Location: Bath, Somerset, England, No.9, Queen Square
- Opening: 1858
- Operator: Sir Richard Sutton Ltd

Design and construction
- Architect: John Wood, the Elder
- Developer: John Wood

Other information
- Number of rooms: 98
- Number of suites: 1
- Number of restaurants: 1

Website
- FrancisHotel.com

The Francis Hotel is a four star hotel located in a Grade I listed building on the south side of Queen Square, Bath, Somerset, England. The hotel is part of the Sutton Hotel Collection and is owned by Sir Richard Sutton Limited, a family-owned business.

Occupying seven Georgian townhouses, the Francis Hotel has 98 bedrooms and has recently undergone a £15 million refurbishment. The redevelopment included the addition of Emberwood, a fire-led hearth restaurant, and a city-centre spa featuring three treatment rooms and an Espuro thermal suite.

== Background ==
The Francis Hotel occupies seven of the nine town houses built between 1728 and 1736, on the south side of Queen Square.

In the Georgian period, John Wood set out to restore Bath to what he believed was its former ancient glory as one of the most important and significant cities in England. In 1725 he developed an ambitious plan for his home town, which due to opposition he developed outside the existing city walls. Wood created a distinctive image for the city, one that has greatly contributed to Bath’s continuing popularity.

Queen Square is a key component of his vision, and was intended to appear like a palace with wings and a forecourt to be viewed from the south side. Named in honour of Queen Caroline, wife of George II, located away from the crowded streets of medieval Bath, but only a short walk to the Abbey, Pump Room, Assembly Rooms and baths, although outside the city walls Queen Square quickly became a popular residence for Bath's Georgian society.

Wood himself chose to live at No.9, on the south side with the best view of the structure imaginable, until he died. No.9 is now the entrance to the Francis Hotel.

== Hotel ==
The nine townhouses that make up the south side of Queen Square remained as individual dwellings until the late nineteenth century.

In 1858, local builder Soloman Francis established a boarding house at No. 10 Queen Square. During the 1870s, his widow, Emily, started to buy the adjacent properties and, by 1884 had expanded the business into Nos 6-9 and 11. In May 1884, the seven Georgian town houses were opened as the Francis Private Hotel.

In April 1942 during World War II, 24 metres (79 ft) of the hotel frontage was lost when a 500 kilograms (1,100 lb) Nazi Luftwaffe high explosive bomb landed on the east side of the square during the Bath Blitz. Casualties were low considering the devastation, with the majority of the guests and staff having taken shelter in the hotel's basement.

J. Hopwood rebuilt the hotel in 1952-53, while The Beatles stayed in the hotel in 1963.

== Present ==
In 2026, the Francis Hotel completed a £15 million refurbishment and reimagination programme,restoring the interiors of the Georgian townhouses. The redevelopment introduced Emberwood, a fire-led hearth restaurant, alongside a new city-centre spa featuring three treatment rooms and an Espuro thermal suite.

The Francis Hotel has 98 bedrooms across a range of room types, including Snug, Cosy, Comfy, Generous, and the John Wood Suite.

The Francis Hotel is part of the Sutton Hotel Collection, launched in April 2022.
