= The Circus, Bath =

Circular Georgian street in Bath, England

The Circus
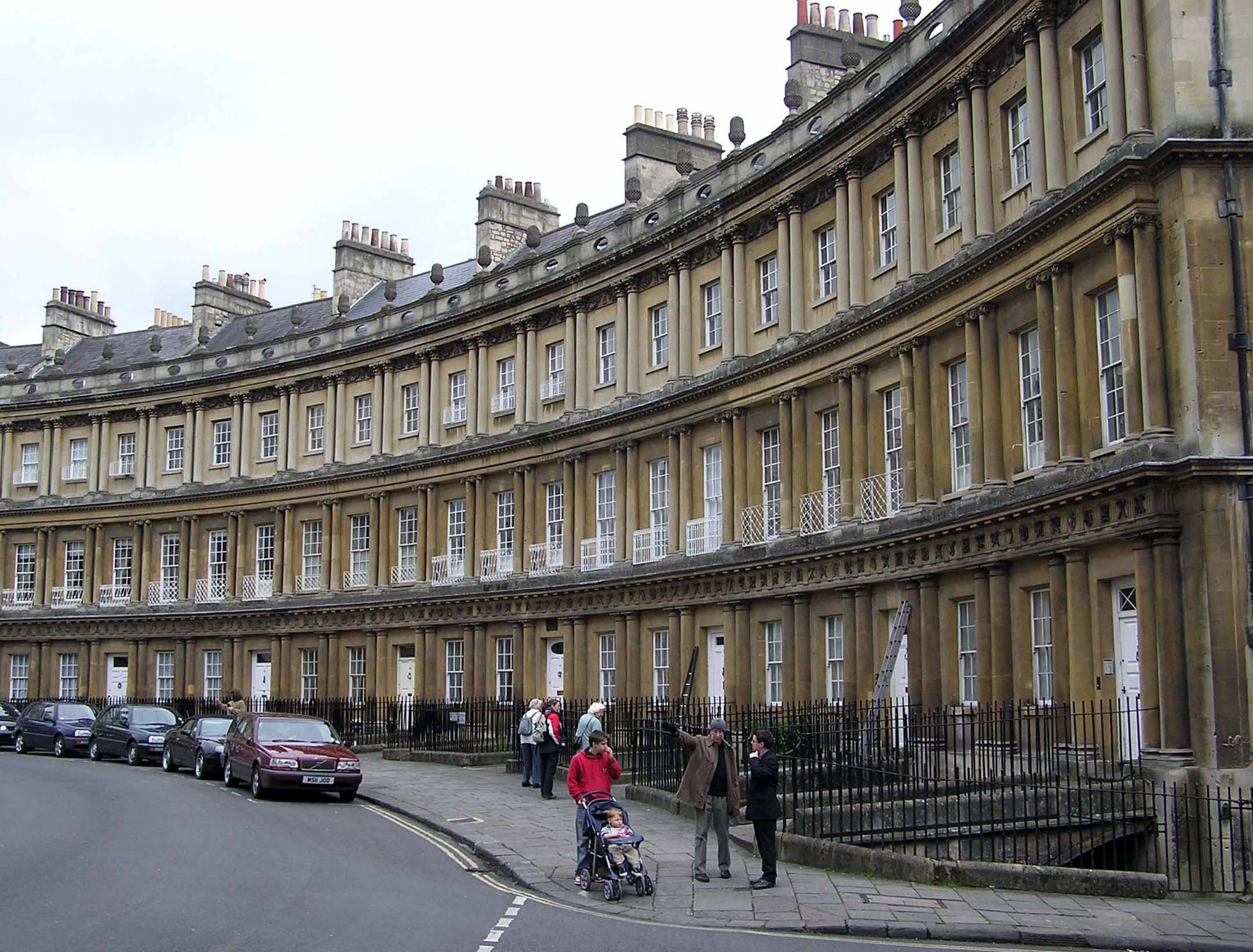
- View of the townhouses
- Interactive map of The Circus
- Former name: King's Circus
- Maintained by: Bath and North East Somerset Council
- Addresses: 1-30 The Circus
- Postal code: BA1 2
- Coordinates: 51.386°N 2.364°W

Construction
- Construction start: 1754
- Completed: 1768

Other
- Designer: John Wood, the Elder
- Status

Listed Building – Grade I
- Official name: 1-30 The Circus including Circus House, Bennett Street
- Designated: 12 June 1950
- Reference no.: 1394142

The Circus is a historic ring of large townhouses in the city of Bath, Somerset, England, forming a circle with three entrances. Designed by architect John Wood, the Elder, it was built between 1754 and 1768, and is regarded as a pre-eminent example of Georgian architecture. The Latin word circus means a ring, oval or circle. The construction has been designated as a Grade I listed building.

The Circus is divided into three segments of equal length, with a lawn in the centre. Each segment faces one of the three entrances, ensuring a classical façade is always presented straight ahead.

== History ==
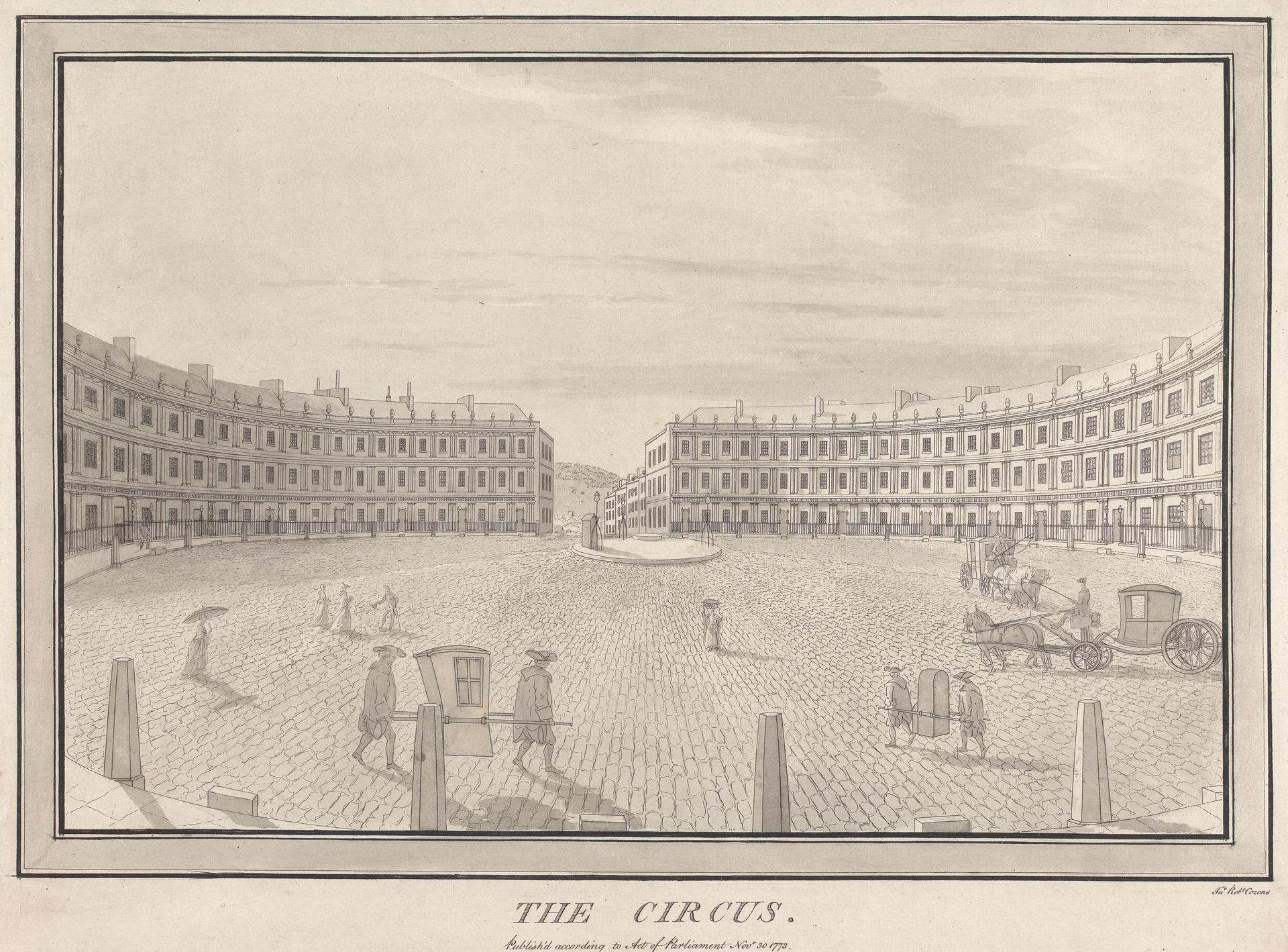
Bath: The Circus – hand-coloured etching by John Robert Cozens, 1773

The Circus, originally called the King's Circus, was designed by the architect John Wood, the Elder. Convinced that Bath had been the principal centre of Druid activity in Britain, Wood surveyed Stonehenge, which has a diameter of 325 feet (99 m) at the outer earth bank, and designed the Circus with a 318-foot (97 m) diameter to mimic this.

Wood died less than three months after the first stone was laid; his son, John Wood, the Younger, completed the project to his father's design. The initial leases for the south west segment were granted in 1755–1767, for the south east segment in 1762–1766, and for the north segment in 1764–1766.

The Circus was part of John Wood the Elder's grand vision to recreate a classical Palladian architectural landscape for the city. Other projects included nearby Queen Square and the never-built Forum. The culmination of Wood's career, the Circus is considered his masterpiece.

The painter Thomas Gainsborough lived in number 17 between 1758 and 1774, using part of its space as his portrait studio. Number 15 was home to Admiral Sir Richard Bickerton and his family in the first half of the 19th century.

During the Bath Blitz of 25/26 April 1942, one of the Baedeker Blitz retaliatory raids on England following the Royal Air Force's raid on Lübeck, Germany, a bomb fell into the Circus, demolishing several of the houses. These have since been reconstructed in the original style.

Architectural historian Dan Cruickshank selected the Circus as one of his five choices for the 2002 BBC television documentary series Britain's Best Buildings.

== Design ==
Three Classical orders (Greek Doric, Roman/Composite and Corinthian) are used, one above the other, in the elegant curved façades. The frieze of the Doric entablature is decorated with alternating triglyphs and 525 pictorial emblems, including serpents, nautical symbols, devices representing the arts and sciences, and Masonic symbols. The parapet is adorned with stone acorn finials.

When viewed from the air, the Circus, along with Queen Square and the adjoining Gay Street, form a key shape, which is a masonic symbol similar to those that adorn many of Wood's buildings.

The central area was originally paved with stone setts, covering a reservoir in the centre that supplied water to the houses. In 1800 the Circus residents enclosed the central part of the open space as a garden. Now, the central area is grassed over and is home to a group of five large plane trees, which are believed to date to around 1820. They are contributing factors to the Grade I listing of the Circus.

== Gallery ==
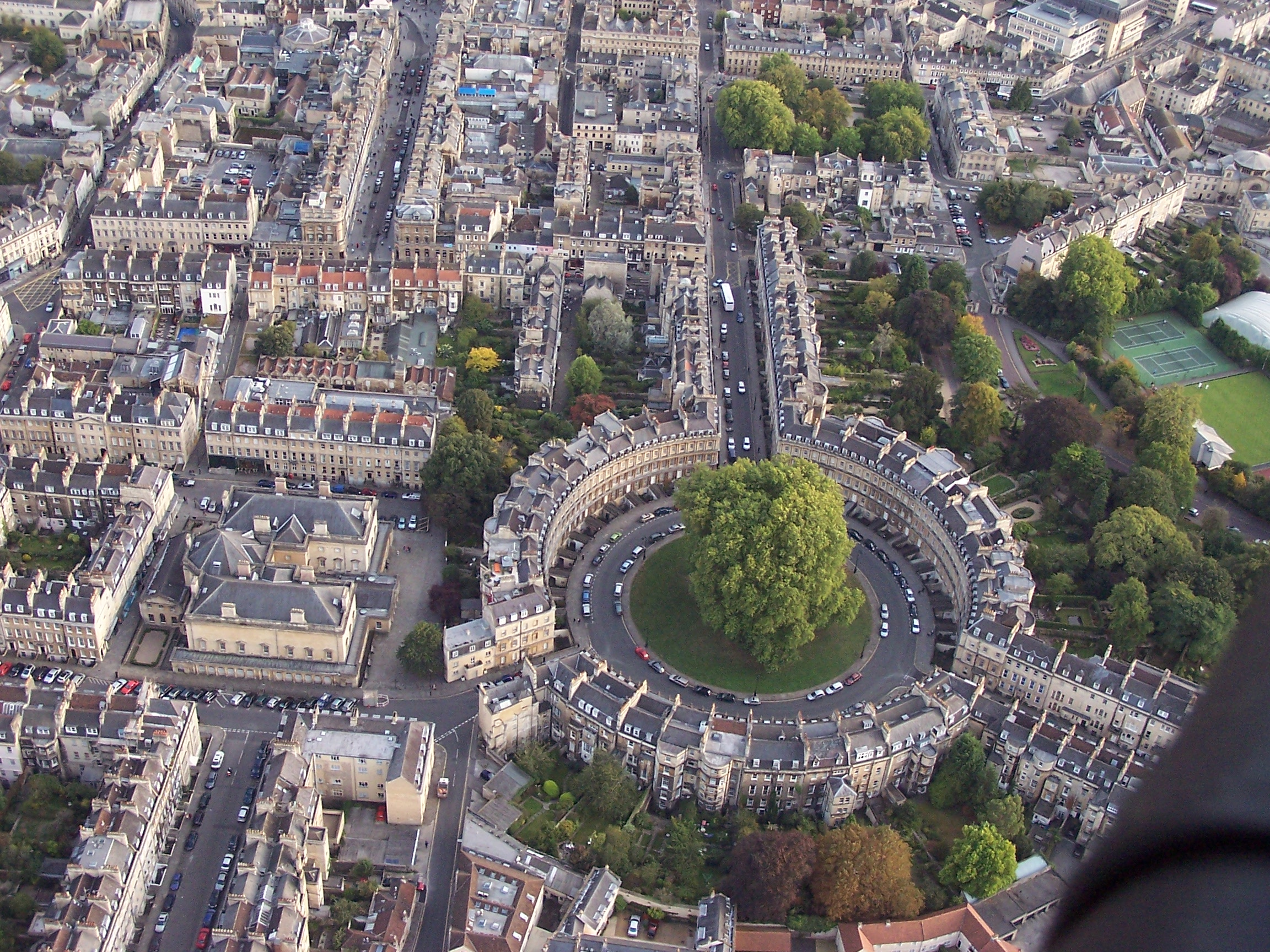
Aerial view

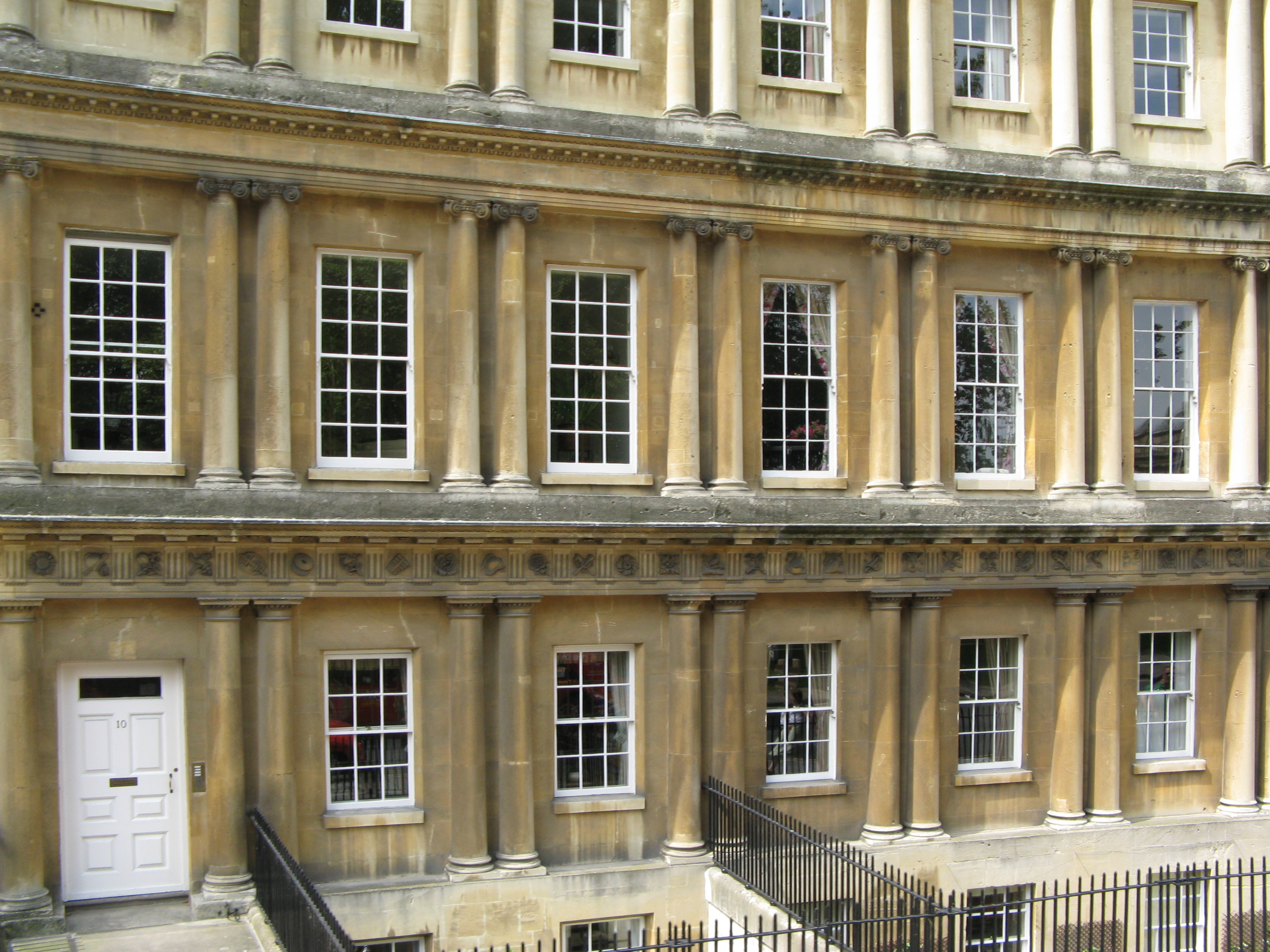
Windows vary in size, and details by Classical order

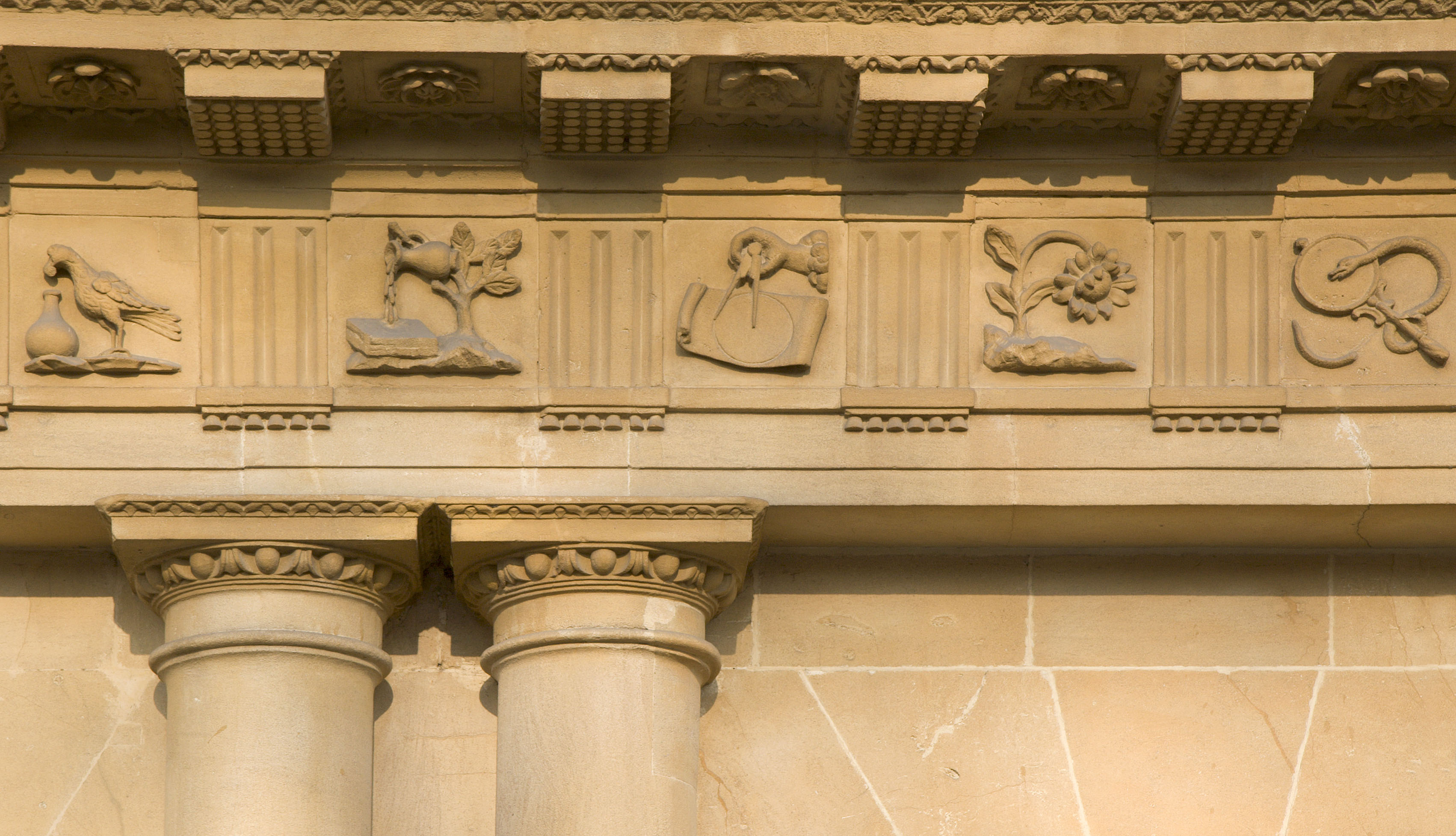
Part of the frieze showing the alternating triglyphs and decorative emblems

== Bibliography ==
- Manco, Jean (2004). The Hub of the Circus: A history of the streetscape of the Circus, Bath. Bath and North East Somerset Council.
- Michael Forsyth, Bath, Pevsner Architectural Guides, Yale University Press, 2003.
