= Occupy Bath =

Protest group against economic inequality

- Part of the "Occupy" protests
- Date: 30 October 2011 – 10 December 2011
- Location: Queen Square, Bath, England
- Caused by: Economic inequality, corporate influence over government, inter alia.
- Methods: Demonstration; occupation; protest; street protesters
- Status: Ended

Occupy Bath was a protest group against economic inequality that began initially with an encampment on 30 October 2011 in Queen Square, Bath, England. The camp was dismantled on 10 December 2011. Occupy Bath described themselves as being "not all anti-capitalist" but rather "pro-economic fairness and pro-direct democracy". The camp held daily meetings, described by the group as general assemblies, which were open to the general public

Within days of setting up camp, Bath and North East Somerset Council stated that they wanted the camp gone by Remembrance Day or sooner, expressing concerns about the state of the grass and disruption to others wishing to use the space and threatening legal action if the camp were to continue past Remembrance Day. The Occupiers claimed shortly afterwards that the leave date of Remembrance Day was due to the original Facebook event requiring an end date, and that they would leave when they felt it was time to.

Campaigners from the Occupy Bath camp attended a conference with representatives from other British Occupy camps at Occupy London on 19 November, based in the Bank of Ideas, a repossessed UBS bank building.

By mid-late November, numbers on site had begun to decline, particularly overnight, with approximately 10-15 people staying at the camp. Towards the end of November, the Occupiers announced that they would be joining the union march during the strike on 30 November 2011, and invited marchers to visit the camp following the march, where there would be speakers, an attempt to explore common ground, and a big announcement. Occupiers spoke in front of the trade unionists in Victoria Park and announced the beginning of a new forum for Bath - the Bath People's Assembly - "an independent, democratic, non-affiliated body for discussion, debate and the formulation of ideas and proposals on local, national and global issues and policies".

The Occupiers packed up the camp on 10 December 2011, stating that they wanted to focus on the Bath People's Assembly and on direct action in the area, stating "This is only the beginning". They claimed that up to 50 people had been camping in Queen Square at the height of the Occupation. Despite previous warnings from B&NES council, the Occupiers were not forced to move. B&NES council said that they planned to send in teams to clean up Queen Square once the Occupiers have left.

== See also ==
- List of Occupy movement protest locations
