= Bath Blitz =

WWII air raids on Bath, Somerset, UK

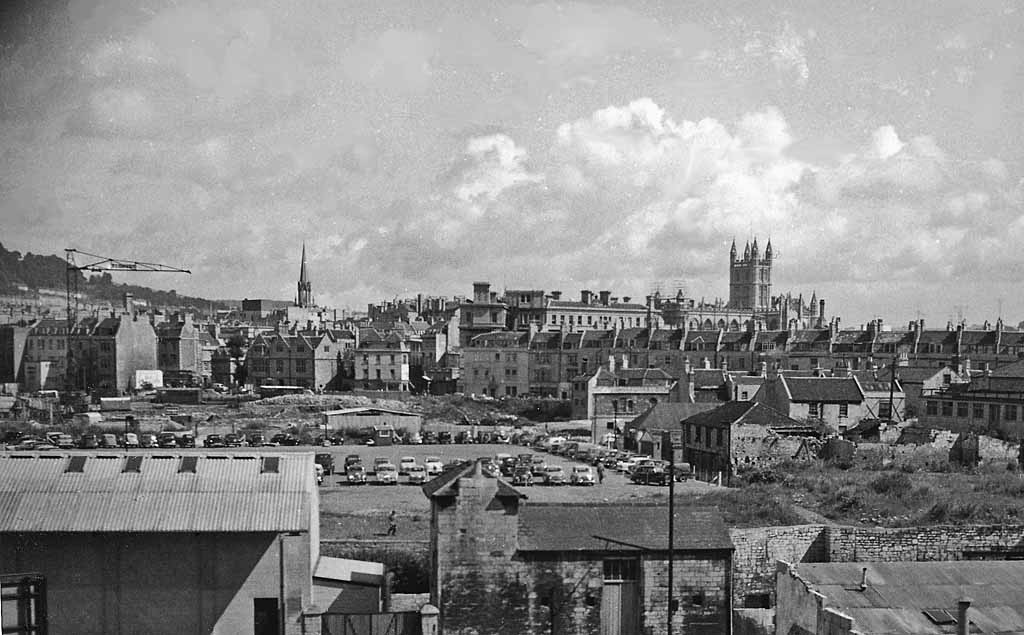
View of the centre of Bath in 1958, still with signs of war damage.

The term Bath Blitz refers to the air raids by the German Luftwaffe on the British city of Bath, Somerset, during World War II.

The city was bombed in April 1942 as part of the so-called "Baedeker raids", in which targets were chosen for their cultural and historical, rather than their strategic or military, value.

== Background ==
Bath was subject to numerous air raid warnings during the Blitz, the German night bombing offensive against Britain's cities, as raiders flew overhead on their way to nearby Bristol which was bombed severely throughout the period, and several bombs fell on Bath during 1940 and 1941. However, the city remained largely untouched until April 1942 and the start of the Baedeker Blitz, mounted in response to a step-change in the effectiveness of the RAF's bombing offensive in March 1942 which resulted in the destruction of the city of Lübeck.

== The Blitz ==
Over the weekend of 25–27 April 1942, Bath suffered three raids from 80 Luftwaffe aircraft which took off from Nazi occupied northern France.

As the city sirens wailed, few citizens took cover, even when the first pathfinder flares fell. The people of Bath still believed the attack was destined for nearby Bristol. During the previous four months, Bristol had been hit almost every night, so the people of Bath did not expect the bombs to fall on them.

The first raid struck just before 11 pm on the Saturday night and lasted until 1 am. The German aircraft then returned to France, refuelled, rearmed and returned at 4.35 am. Bath was still on fire from the first raid, making it easier for the German bombers to pick out their targets. The third raid, which only lasted two hours but caused extensive damage, commenced in the early hours of Monday morning. The bombers flew low to drop their high explosives and incendiaries, and then returned to rake the streets with machine-gun fire.

== Effects ==
417 people were killed, another 1,000 injured. Over 19,000 buildings were affected, of which 1,100 were seriously damaged or destroyed, including 218 of architectural or historic interest. Houses in the Royal Crescent, Circus and Paragon were destroyed and the Assembly Rooms were burnt out. A 500-kilogram (1,100 lb) high explosive bomb landed on the south side of Queen Square, resulting in houses on the south side being damaged. The Francis Hotel lost 24 metres (79 ft) of its hotel frontage, and most of the buildings on Queen Square suffered some level of shrapnel damage. Casualties on the Square were low, considering the devastation, with the majority of hotel guests and staff having taken shelter in the hotel's basement. The majority of Bath's churches were greatly damaged, including St James Church on Stall Street and St Andrew's Church, both of which had to be demolished; the St James site is now a retail building and the St Andrew's site is now a park.

Many buildings have subsequently been restored, or otherwise have been replaced by different buildings or a new land use (such as a park), although there are still some signs of the bombing.

== Legacy ==
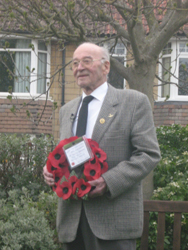
Willi Schludecker at the 25 April 2008 memorial service in Bath, with his remembrance wreath.

After the raid, an air-raid shelter was provided for Queen Square occupants in the then private central garden. In 1948, the residents gave the garden to the people of Bath with the intention it would become a memorial to the victims of the enemy attacks. Today the square plays host to a variety of community activities, including the Jane Austen Festival and the annual Bath Boules Tournament.

Willi Schludecker, 87, who flew more than 120 sorties for the Luftwaffe, including the Bath Blitz, travelled to the UK as part of Bath's annual remembrance service on Friday 25 April 2008. Willi Schludecker died in a hospital in Cologne on 17 June 2010, at the age of 90.

Among the firefighters assigned to the scene in Bath was Harry Patch, who in the 2000s became the last surviving frontline British Army veteran from the First World War.

In 2016, a live 230-kilogram (500 lb) bomb was discovered by workmen under the playground of the former Royal High School, Bath site. The bomb, which had remained undiscovered for over 70 years, was made safe by a bomb disposal team before being removed to the Torr Works quarry and blown up.

== General references ==
- Grayling, A. C. (2006). Among the Dead Cities: Was the Allied Bombing of Civilians in WWII a Necessity or a Crime?. London: Bloomsbury Publishing. pp. 50–52. ISBN 978-0-7475-7671-6. OCLC 1391179967. OL 22239519M. Wikidata Q136472797.
- Harris, Arthur (1947); Bomber Offensive, Pen & Sword, (Paperback 2005), ISBN 1-84415-210-3; p. 105
