= 21–27 Queen Square, Bath =

Building in Bath, England

21–27 Queen Square
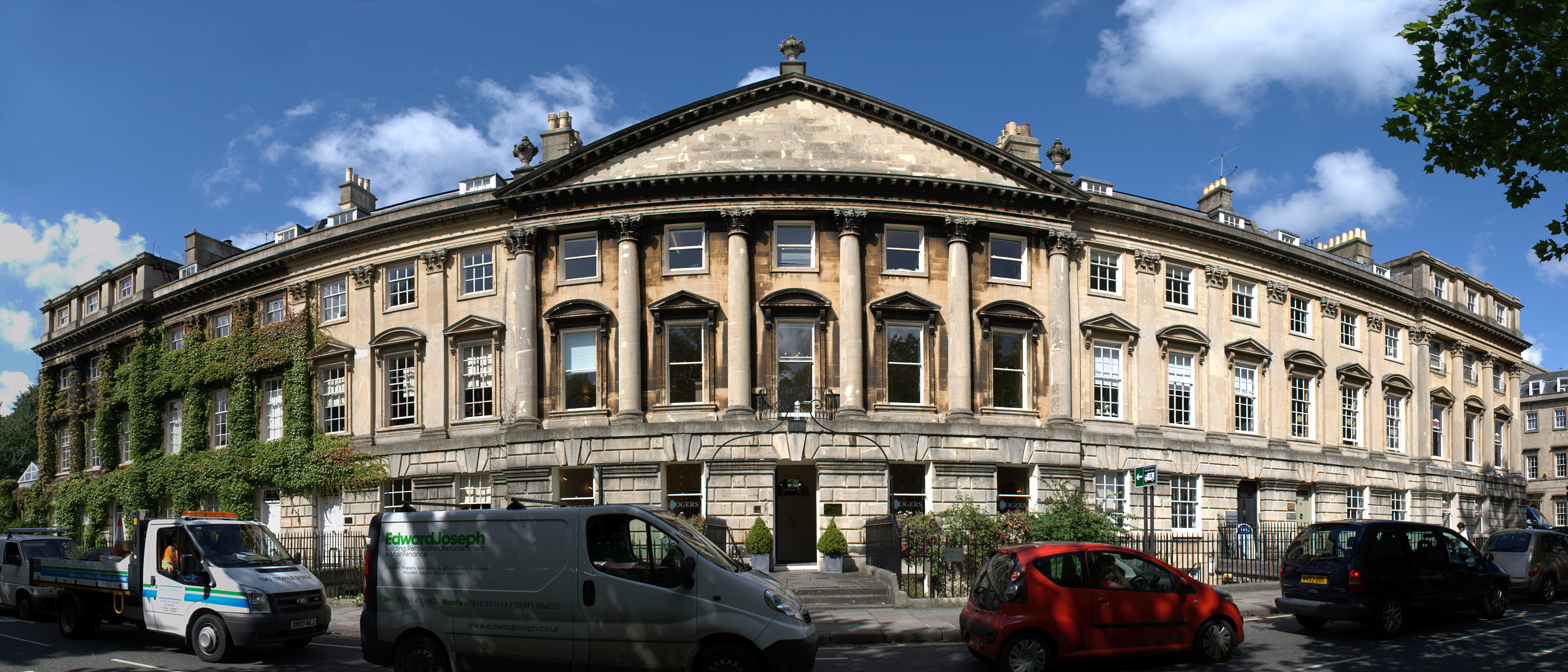
- The building in 2009
- Interactive map of the 21–27 Queen Square area

General information
- Location: 21–27 Queen Square, Bath, Somerset, England
- Coordinates: 51.383850°N 2.36385°W
- Completed: 1736 (290 years ago)

21–27 Queen Square is a historic row of buildings in Bath, Somerset, England. Described by Nikolaus Pevsner as "one of the finest Palladian compositions in England before 1730," it is now a Grade I listed building. Completed in 1736, the building was given listed status in 1950.

The building consists of seven symmetrical terraced houses, built in limestone ashlar, on the northern side of Queen Square. John Wood, the Elder, died at number 24 in 1754.
