= Gay Street, Bath =

Gay Street
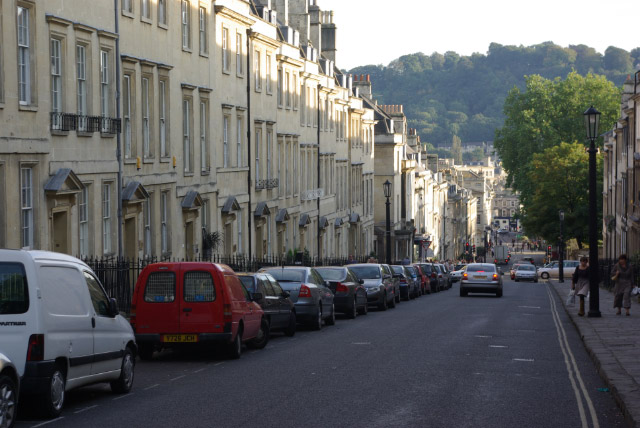

- Location within Somerset
- 51°23′05″N 2°21′49″W
- Location: Bath, Somerset, England

History
- Built: 1735-1750

Site notes
- Architect: John Wood, the Elder

Listed Building – Grade I
- Official name: 18-30, Gay Street
- Designated: 12 June 1950
- Reference no.: 1395825

Listed Building – Grade I
- Official name: 2-17, Gay Street
- Designated: 12 June 1950
- Reference no.: 1395823

Listed Building – Grade I
- Official name: 41, Gay Street
- Designated: 12 June 1950
- Reference no.: 1395837

Listed Building – Grade II
- Official name: 31 Gay Street; 12 and 12A, George Street
- Designated: 12 June 1950
- Reference no.: 1395912

Listed Building – Grade II
- Official name: 32, Gay Street
- Designated: 12 June 1950
- Reference no.: 1395828

Listed Building – Grade II
- Official name: 33, Gay Street
- Designated: 12 June 1950
- Reference no.: 1395831

Listed Building – Grade II
- Official name: 34, Gay Street
- Designated: 12 June 1950
- Reference no.: 1395832

Listed Building – Grade II
- Official name: 35-40, Gay Street
- Designated: 12 June 1950
- Reference no.: 1395835

Gay Street in Bath, Somerset, England, links Queen Square to The Circus. It was designed by John Wood, the Elder, in 1735 and completed by his son John Wood, the Younger. The land was leased to the elder Wood by Robert Gay, MP for Bath, and the street is named after him. Much of the road has been designated as Grade I listed buildings.

The houses are of 3 storeys with Mansard roofs, with many also having Ionic columns. There are slight variations in window design but they work together to provide a consistent streetscape. Many of the houses are now used as offices.

Numbers 2 to 17 are on the west side. Hester Thrale, who was also known as Mrs Piozzi, lived at number 8, with its 4 Corinthian pilasters on the ground and 1st floors in 1781. Number 18 to 30 are on the east side of the road. It was built before the west side.

Number 41 is on the corner between Gay Street and Queen Square. It was the home of John Wood, the Younger.

Numbers 31 to 40 have been designated as Grade II. The Jane Austen Centre is at number 40, although Jane Austen actually lived at number 25.

== Gallery ==
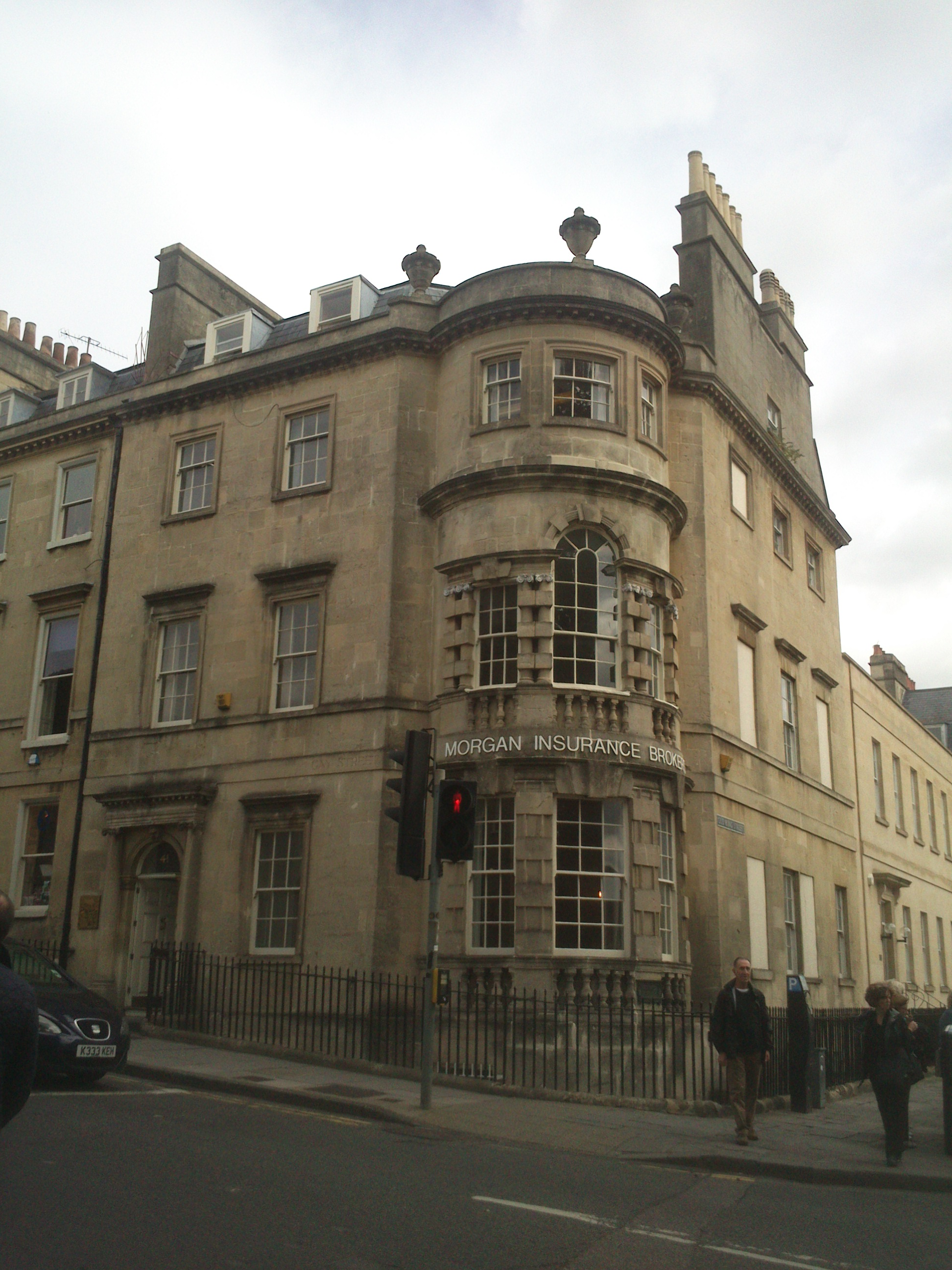
41 Gay Street, Bath
- List of Grade I listed buildings in Bath and North East Somerset
