= John Wood, the Elder =

English architect (1704–1754)

John Wood
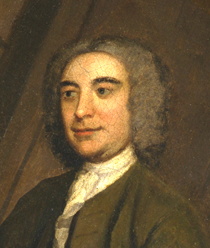
- Born: 1704; Twerton, England
- Died: 23 May 1754 (Aged 49–50); Bath, England
- Occupation: Architect
- Buildings: St John's Hospital, Prior Park, The Royal Mineral Water Hospital
- Projects: Queen Square, North and South Parades, The Circus

John Wood, the Elder (1704 – 23 May 1754) was an English architect, working mainly in Bath.

In 1740 he surveyed Stonehenge and the Stanton Drew stone circles. He later wrote extensively about Bladud and Neo-Druidism. Because of some of his designs he is also thought to have been involved in the early years of Freemasonry.

His notable work in Bath included: St John's Hospital, Queen Square, Prior Park, The Royal Mineral Water Hospital, the North and South Parades and The Circus. Wood also designed important buildings outside Bath, including the reconstruction of Llandaff Cathedral, Buckland House, The Exchange, Bristol, and Liverpool Town Hall. He has been described by Nikolaus Pevsner as "one of the outstanding architects of the day".

== Early life ==
Wood was born in Twerton near Bath, and baptised in St. James's Church (now demolished). He received a good but basic education at King Edward's School. His father George was a local builder.

During his teenage years and early twenties, Wood worked for Robert Benson, the first Baron Bingley at his estate, Bramham Park, Yorkshire. He then became involved in speculative builds on the Cavendish estate in London.

== Style and vision ==
Through reading, site visits and practical experience Wood developed his unique ideas in order to create an ambitious master plan for his home town. Through his continual self-education, Wood refined his architectural beliefs and by his mid-twenties had combined his passion for Palladianism (a type of classical architecture) with his obsession with Ancient British history, and almost certainly Freemasonry.

Wood set out to restore Bath to what he believed was its former ancient glory as one of the most important and significant cities in England. In 1725 he developed an ambitious plan for his home town, which due to opposition he developed outside the existing city walls. Wood created a distinctive image for the city, one that has greatly contributed to Bath's continuing popularity.

Wood's plans for Bath were hampered by the corporation (council), churchmen, landowners and moneymen. Instead he approached Robert Gay, a barber surgeon from London, and the owner of the Barton Farm estate in the Manor of Walcot, outside the city walls. On these fields Wood established Bath's architectural style, the basic principles of which were copied by all those architects who came after him. Wood created one of the greatest attractions in the world, recognised by UNESCO for embodying a number of outstanding universal values — including the deliberate creation of a beautiful and unified city.

=== Speculative Building ===
At Queen Square, Wood introduced speculative building to Bath. This meant that whilst Wood leased the land from Robert Gay for £137 per annum, designed the frontages, and divided the ground into the individual building plots, he sub-let to other individual builders or masons. They had two years grace in which to get the walls up and the roof on, after which they had to pay a more substantial rent. As Bath was booming, most plots were reserved before the two years were up, providing the builder with the necessary income to complete the house. Ultimately this meant less work and risk for Wood; in addition he received £305 per annum in rents, leaving him a healthy profit of £168 – the equivalent today (in terms of average earnings) of £306,000.

== Bath architecture ==
Wood is known for designing many of the streets and buildings of Bath, such as St John's Hospital, (1727–28), Queen Square (1728–36), Prior Park (1734–41), The Royal Mineral Water Hospital (1738–42) the North (1740) and South Parades (1743–48), The Circus (1754–68), and other notable houses, many of which are Grade I listed buildings.

In 1716 the architect William Killigrew was commissioned to rebuild the St John's Hospital, which had been founded around 1180, by Bishop Reginald Fitz Jocelin making it among the oldest almshouses in England. Construction continued after 1727 with John Wood, the Elder undertaking the building, as his first work in Bath, when he was aged 23.

Ralph Allen's Town House was commissioned by Ralph Allen who commenced building it in or shortly after 1727. Opinion is divided as to whether John Wood the Elder designed the "Town House", however the ostentatious decoration is not a style he uses elsewhere in Bath. Wood, in his "Essay towards the future of Bath", says — while Mr.Allen was making the Addition to the North Part of his House in Lilliput Alley he new fronted and raised the old Building a full Story higher; it consists of a Basement Story sustaining a double Story under the Crowning; and this is surmounted by an Attick, which created a sixth Rate House, and a Sample for the greatest Magnificence that was ever proposed by me for our City Houses.

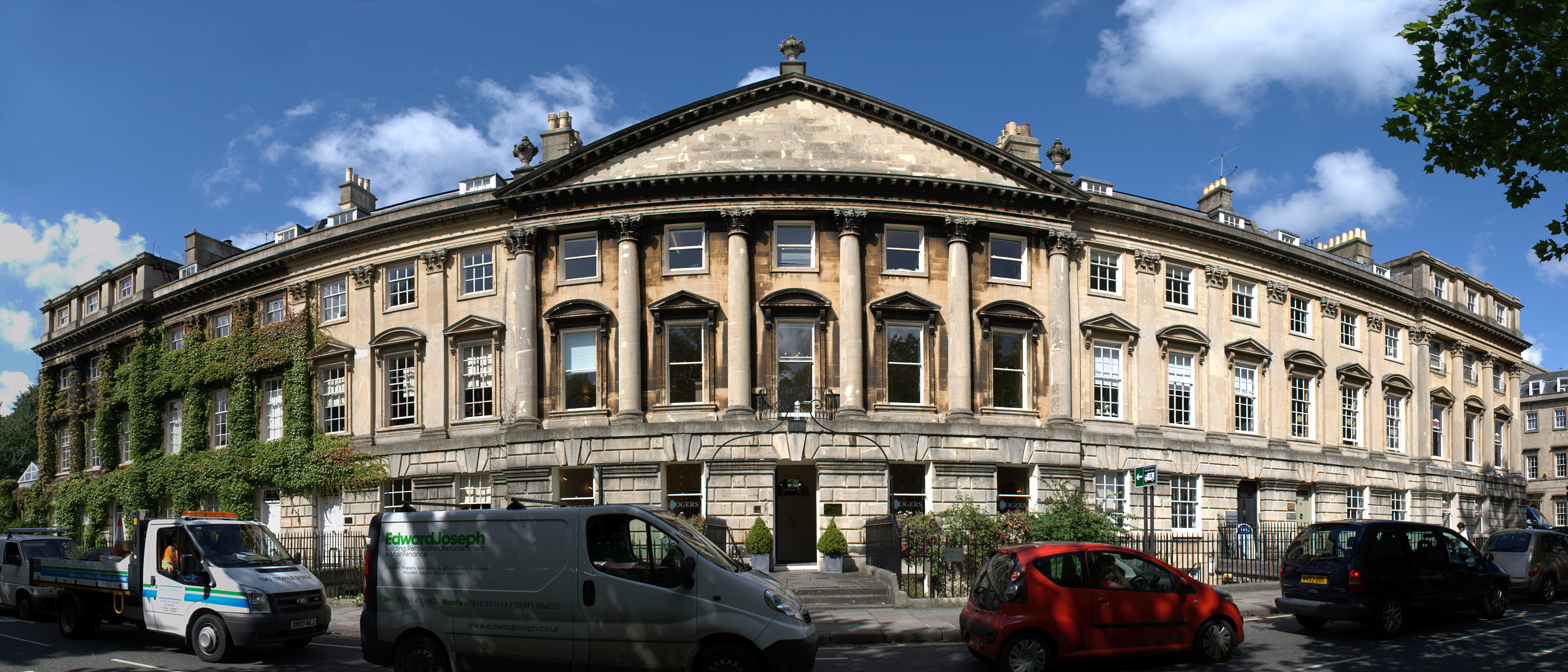
12–27 Queen Square, Bath

Queen Square was Wood's first speculative development. Wood lived in a house on the square. Numbers 21–27 make up the north side, which was described by Nikolaus Pevsner as "one of the finest Palladian compositions in England before 1730". The west side (numbers 14 – 18 and 18A, 19 and 20) was designed by John Pinch in 1830 and differs from Wood's original design as the central block is in Neo-Grecian style. 16–18 is now occupied by the Bath Royal Literary and Scientific Institution. The south side (numbers 5–13) which was originally left open is now occupied by a hotel.

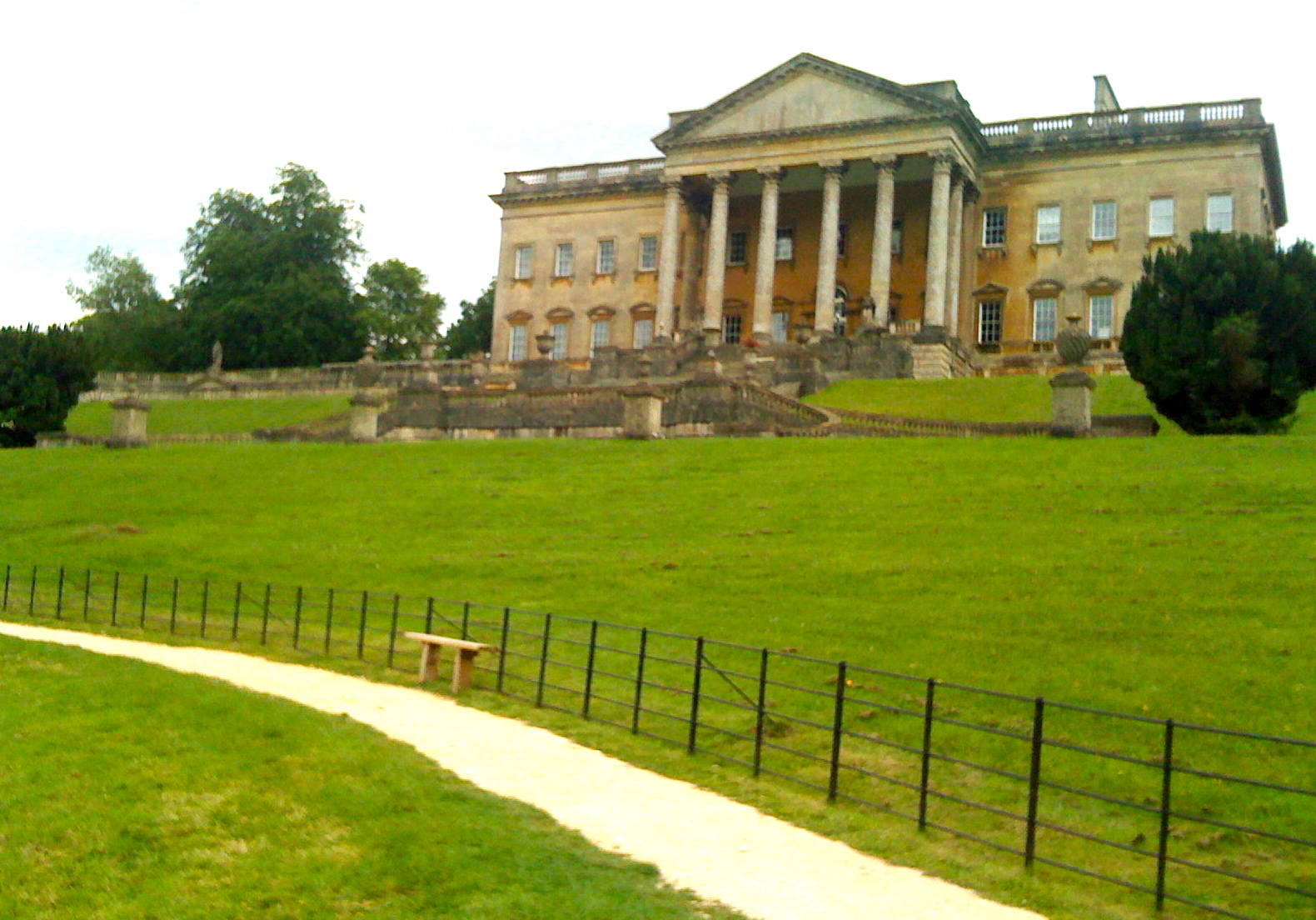
Prior Park, the Palladian mansion built in 1742 for Ralph Allen

In 1742, Wood was commissioned to build a home for the mayor of Bath Ralph Allen, on a hill overlooking the city of Bath. This building is Grade I listed and has housed Prior Park College since 1830.

The building for the Royal National Hospital for Rheumatic Diseases was designed by Wood and built with Bath Stone donated by Ralph Allen. It was later enlarged, firstly in 1793 by the addition of an attic storey and later in 1860 by a second building erected on the west side of the earlier edifice. It is a Grade II listed building. There is a fine pediment, in Bath stone, on 1860 building depicting the parable of the Good Samaritan.

North Parade was part of a wider scheme to build a Royal Forum, including South Parade, Pierrepont and Duke Streets, similar to Queen Square, which was never completed. Wood designed the facade, of Bath Stone, after which a variety of builders completed the work with different interiors and rear elevations.

Wood Street was built in 1778 and has been designated as a Grade I listed building. The street was designed by John Wood, the Elder and built by Thomas Baldwin in the same style as the adjacent Queen Square.

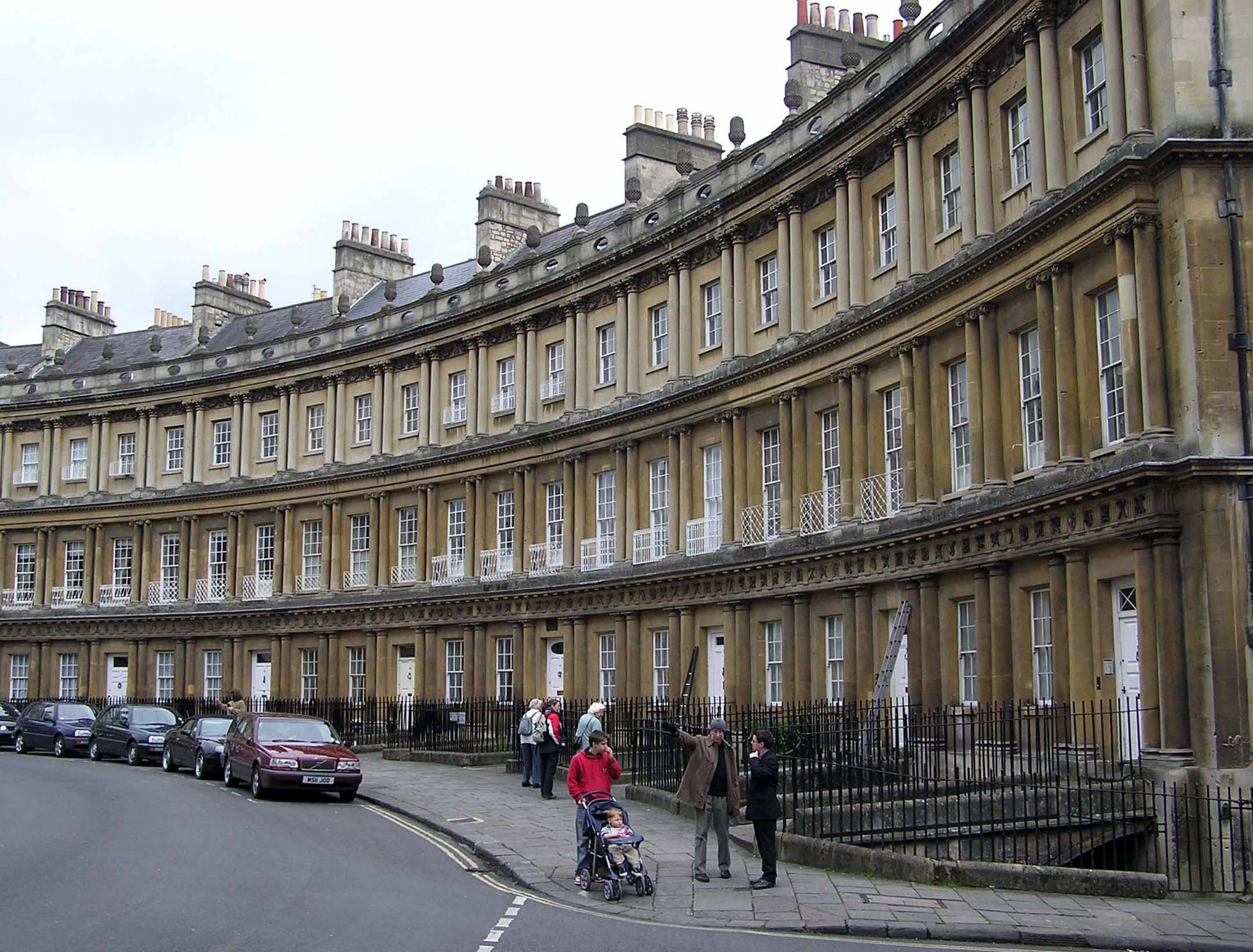
The Circus

His final masterpiece was the Circus, built on Barton Fields outside the old city walls of Bath, although he never lived to see his plans put into effect as he died less than three months after the first stone was laid. It was left to his son, John Wood, the Younger to complete the scheme to his father's design. Wood's inspiration was the Roman Colosseum, but whereas the Colosseum was designed to be seen from the outside, the Circus faces inwardly. Three classical Orders, (Greek Doric, Roman/Composite and Corinthian) are used, one above the other, in the elegant curved facades. The frieze of the Doric entablature is decorated with alternating triglyphs and 525 pictorial emblems, including serpents, nautical symbols, devices representing the arts and sciences, and masonic symbols. The parapet is adorned with stone acorn finials. He demonstrated how a row of town houses could be dignified, almost palatial. The uses of uniform facades and rhythmic proportions in conjunction with classical principles of unerring symmetry were followed throughout the city.

== Architecture outside Bath ==
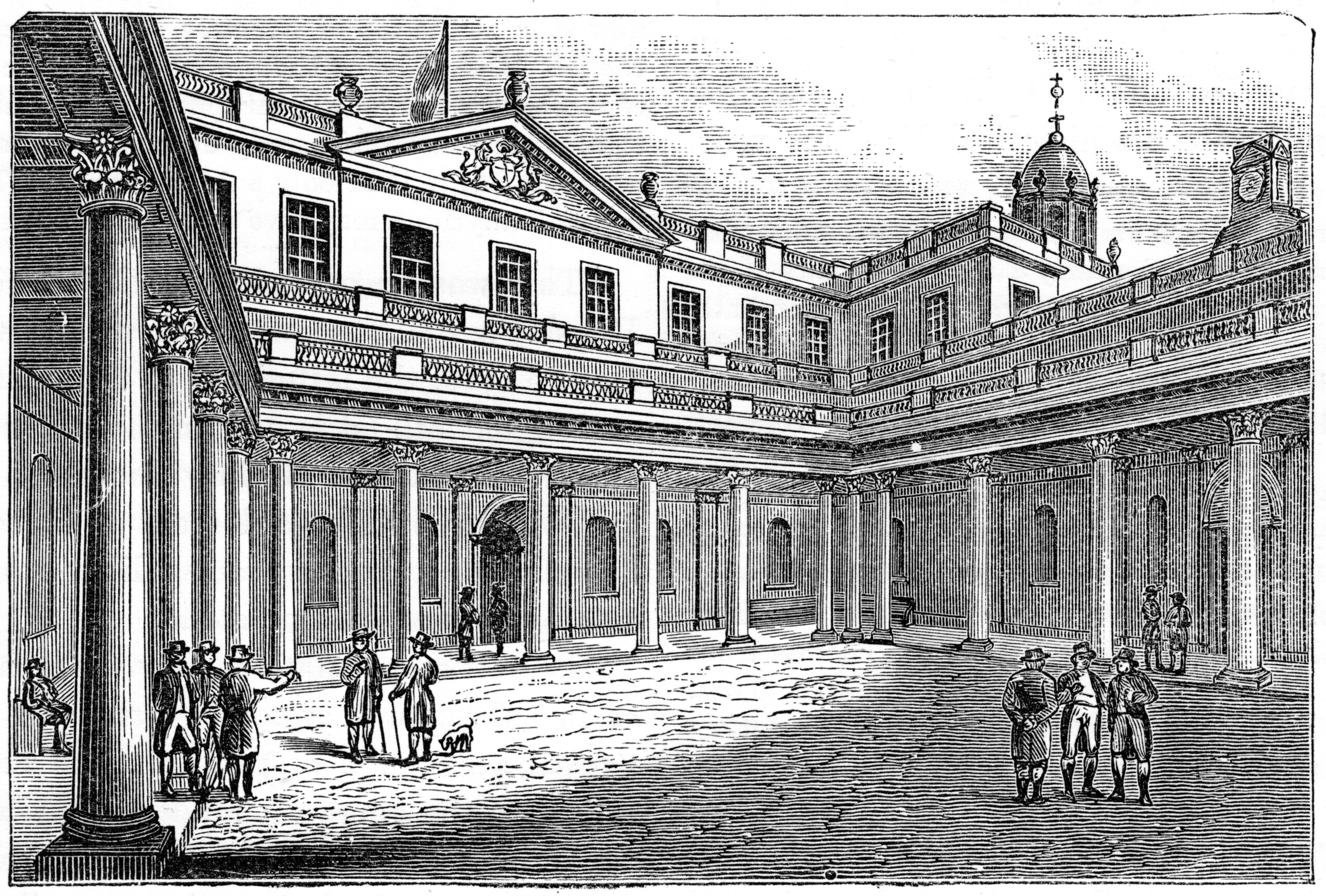
The Courtyard, The Exchange, Bristol (1741–43), this was roofed over in the 19th century

Wood also designed important buildings outside Bath, the reconstruction of Llandaff Cathedral 1734–1749, The Exchange, Bristol 1741–43, Liverpool Town Hall 1749–54.

Wood's work on the rebuilding of Llandaff Cathedral gained the nicknamed of the "Italian Temple". It was used for a hundred years but never completed and only a few stones remain.

The Exchange in Bristol was built in 1741–43 by Wood, with carvings by Thomas Paty. Wood was also the architect of the Liverpool Exchange, which was completed in 1754 and gutted by fire in 1795. The London Exchange of Wood's day was also destroyed by fire in 1838. Bristol's Exchange is therefore unique, the only surviving 18th-century exchange building in England. When finished in 1743 the Exchange, as planned, had "the outward appearance of one grand structure," and the much-admired exterior remains today largely as built. The front of the building has Corinthian columns in the centre and pilasters to the sides. A central semicircular-arched doorway has cast-iron lion-head knockers. A frieze with human and animal heads symbolises trade, and a royal coat of arms is displayed in the tympanum. The rear of the building is symmetrical with pedimented windows and semicircular ground-floor arches.

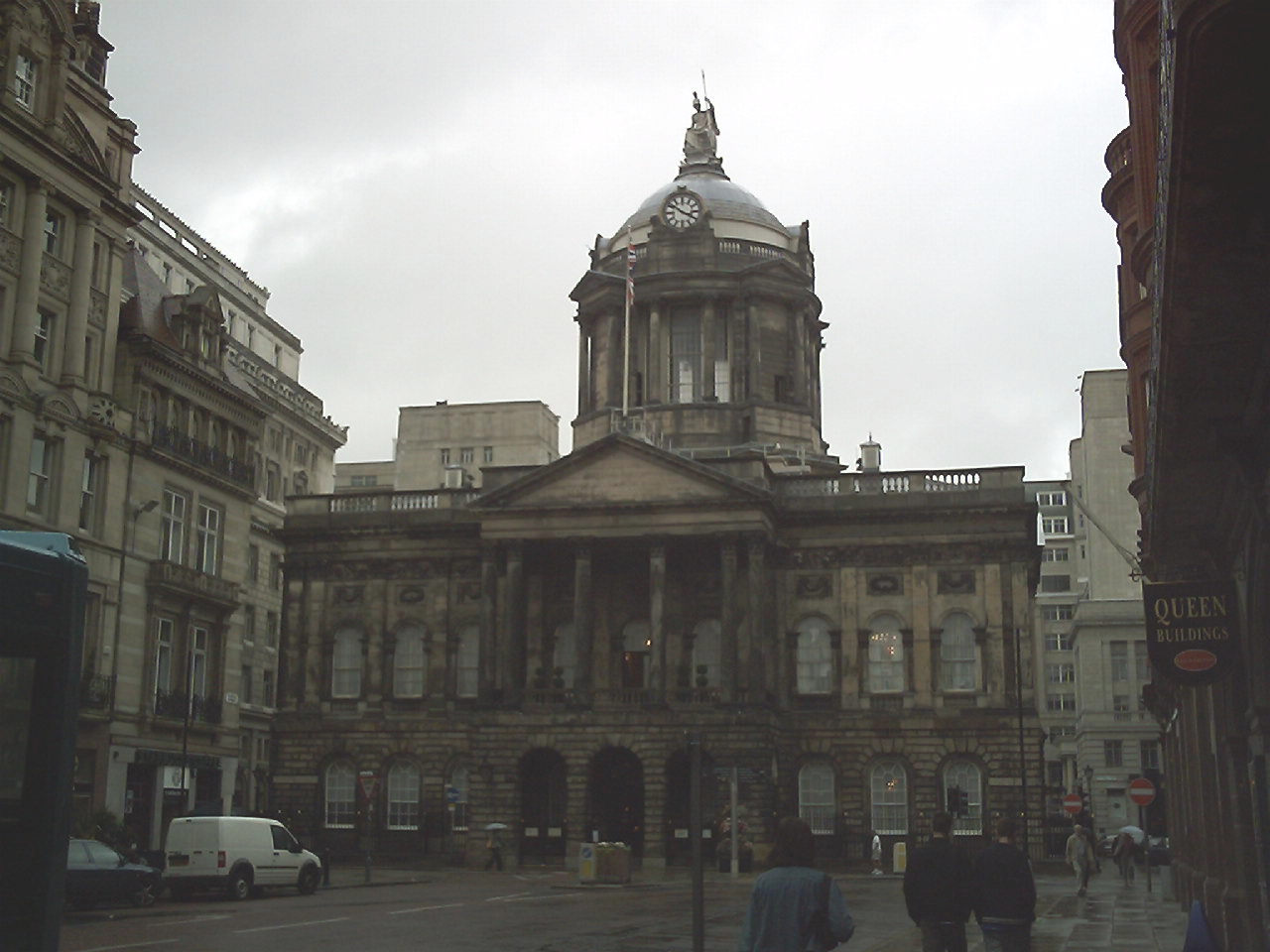
Liverpool Town Hall (1749–54), with later dome and portico

Liverpool Town Hall was built between 1749 and 1754 to a design by Wood replacing an earlier town hall nearby. An extension to the north designed by James Wyatt was added in 1785. The ground floor acted as the exchange, and a council room and other offices were on the upper floor. The ground floor had a central courtyard surrounded by Doric colonnades but it was "dark and confined, and the merchants preferred to transact business in the street outside". Following a fire in 1795 the hall was largely rebuilt and the portico and dome were added by James Wyatt who also redesigned the interiors.

Buckland House is a large Georgian stately home and the manor house of Buckland in Oxfordshire built in 1757. Sir Robert Throckmorton, the fourth baronet of Coughton, who commissioned Wood to design the new Buckland House as a shooting lodge and weekend retreat. John Wood, the Younger substantially revised the plan and added the distinctive octagonal pavilions to the sides of the house. The final house is illustrated in the 1767 volume of Vitruvius Britannicus.

== Stonehenge and Stanton Drew surveys ==
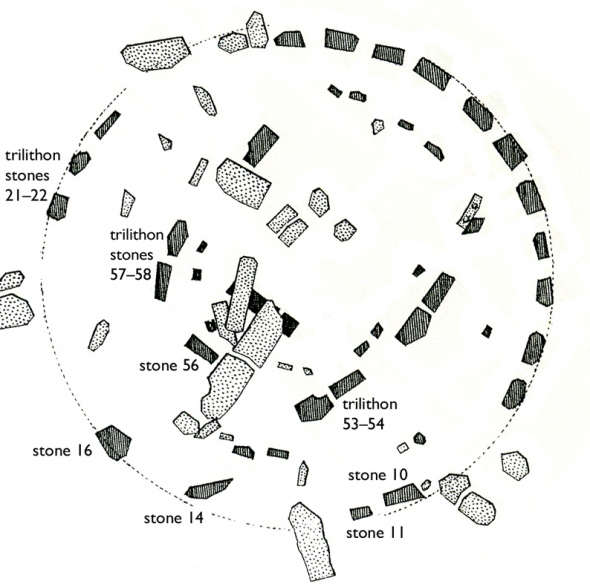
Part of Wood's plan of Stonehenge

Wood also left us the most important plan of Stonehenge ever made; his survey, carried out in 1740 and published in his Choir Gaure, Vulgarly Called Stonehenge, on Salisbury Plain (1747), was annotated with hundreds of measurements, which he resolved on the ground to one half, sometimes even one quarter, of an inch. This work has been largely overlooked, partly due to criticisms made by the antiquarian William Stukeley. Wood's interpretation of the monument as a place of pagan ritual was vehemently attacked by Stukeley who saw the druids not as pagans, but as biblical patriarchs. Stukely also failed to see the significance of recording the stones in such detail. However, using Wood's original dimensions it has been possible to re-draw his work on a computer and compare the record with the modern plan of Stonehenge. His survey has immense archaeological value, for he recorded the stones fifty years before the collapse of the western trilithon (which fell in 1797 and was not restored until 1958).

In the same year Wood surveyed and mapped the Stanton Drew stone circles, noting the different stones used and suggesting the layout was based on the Pythagorean planetary system.

== Freemasonry ==
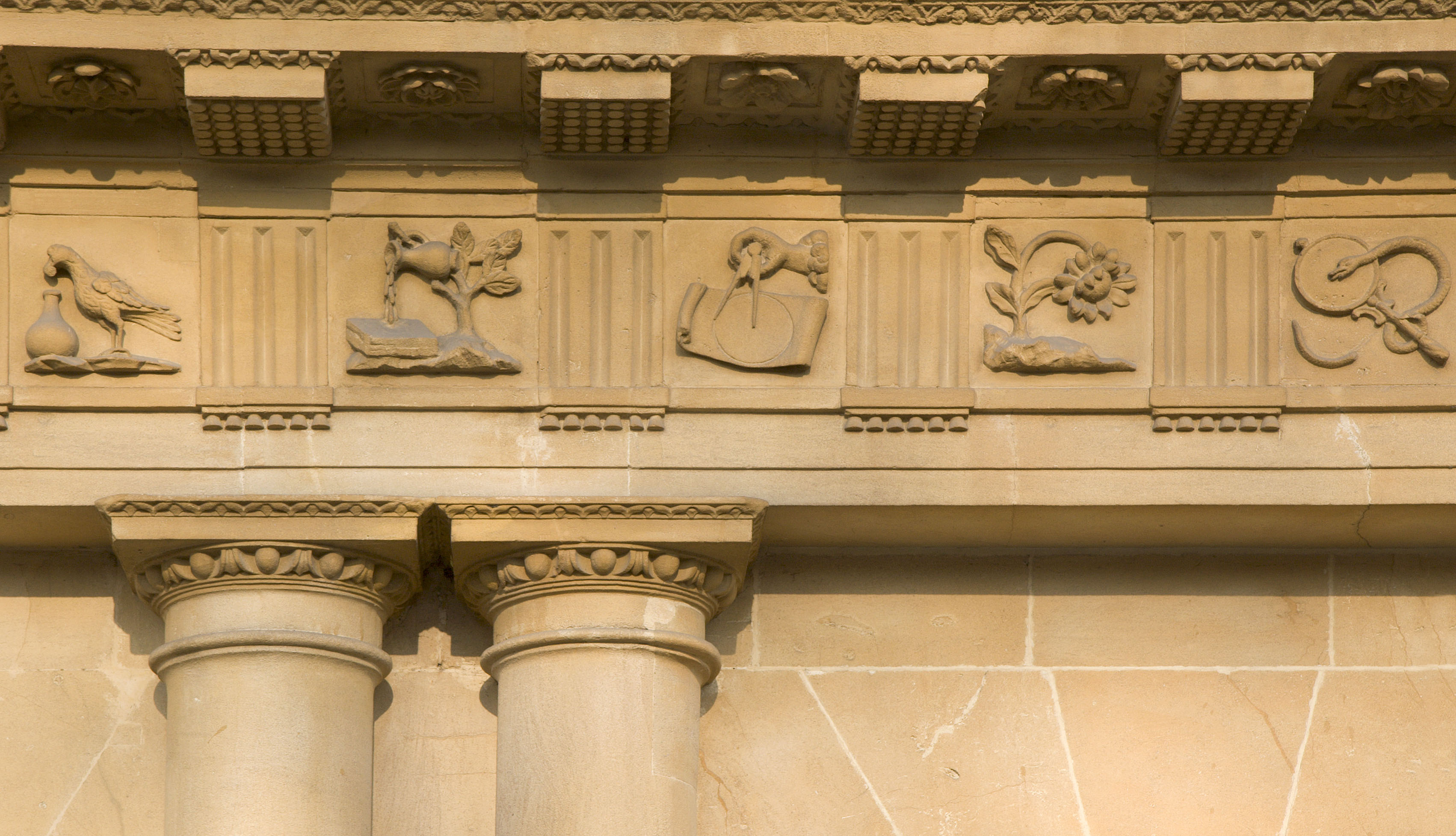
Detail of some of the emblems used by Wood in The Circus

Many of the buildings he designed are littered with icons and symbols associated with Freemasonry, leading many people who have studied his work to believe that he was a member of the organisation, even though there is no documentary proof. Wood wrote extensively about sacred geometry, and argued that the myths of the supposed founder of Bath, King Bladud, were based on truth. He claimed that ancient British stone circles were the remains of once more elaborate buildings designed by Bladud.

It has been suggested that Wood (and his son, also John) were connected to Freemasonry either via one of their building partnerships and/or via symbolism in their architecture. In his Masonic lecture and article, Stephen Ben Cox tentatively suggests an image for this as the square (Queen's Square), the circle (The Circus) and the crescent (The Royal Crescent): standing for Earth, Sun and Moon, and following the masonic path of the sun in the Lodge from east (the Master chair) to south (the Junior Warden) and exiting in the west (the Senior Warden) as a symbol of man's spiritual progress in life from the rough to the smooth ashlar.

When viewed from the air, the Circus, along with Queens Square and the adjoining Gay Street, form a key shape, which is a masonic symbol similar to those that adorn many of Wood's buildings. Cox notes that there is no direct evidence of deliberate Masonic expression in the architecture (although there are plenty of carved signs and symbols which are important to Freemasonry). He goes on however to say that it is interesting to note that Queen Square is lower down the hill whilst The Circus overlooks it at the top of the hill, whilst to the west The Crescent faces out across the open space of the park sloping away from it.

Media proprietor Felix Farley (c. 1708–1753) published Wood's The Origin of Building: Or, The Plagiarism of the Heathens Detected, In Five Books.

== Bladud and the druids ==
In many of Woods writings, and particularly The Essay towards a description of Bath, he describes Bladud, a legendary king of the Britons for whose existence there is no historical evidence, as the founder of Bath. Wood repeats and embellishes earlier stories that Bladud founded the city because while he was in Athens he contracted leprosy, and when he returned home he was imprisoned as a result, but escaped and went far off to go into hiding. He found employment as a swineherd at Swainswick, about two miles from the later site of Bath, and noticed that his pigs would go into an alder-moor in cold weather and return covered in black mud. He found that the mud was warm, and that they did it to enjoy the heat. He also noticed that the pigs which did this did not suffer from skin diseases as others did, and on trying the mud bath himself found that he was cured of his leprosy. He was then restored to his position as heir-apparent to his father, and founded Bath so that others might also benefit as he had done. Wood also writes about Neo-Druidism which had been popularised in the 17th and 18th centuries by writers such as John Aubrey, John Toland and William Stukeley in conjunction with exploration of the stone circles at Stonehenge and Stanton Drew. Like Inigo Jones before him, who had also surveyed Stonehenge, Wood's study of these two monuments had an important influence on his work in providing key dimensions for the Circus in Bath and confirming his interest in the local antiquity of circular and crescent forms.

== Death and legacy ==
Wood died in Bath on 23 May 1754.

Many of his building projects were continued by his son John Wood, the Younger, including the Royal Crescent, Bath Assembly Rooms and Buckland House. He also finished The Circus.

Only two portraits of Wood are known to exist, one of which is a wooden bust which was carved from a death mask.

There is an off-campus dormitory complex belonging to the University of Bath named John Wood Complex, on Avon Street.

Bath is now a World Heritage Site, at least partly as a result of the Woods' architecture.
