= Baedeker Blitz =

German air raids on British cities during World War II

- Part of the Western Front of World War II
- Baedeker Blitz (England) Map of England with the main cities targeted in the Baedeker Blitz
Date	April–May 1942
Location	England
Result	German strategic failure

Belligerents
United Kingdom	Germany

Commanders and leaders
(United Kingdom) Sholto Douglas; (United Kingdom) Frederick Alfred Pile	(Nazi Germany) Hermann Göring; (Nazi Germany) Hugo Sperrle

Strength
RAF Fighter Command: No. 11 Group RAF; No. 9 Group RAF; No. 10 Group RAF; No. 12 Group RAF; Anti-Aircraft Command	Luftflotte 3: KG2; KG106; I/KG100

Casualties and losses
1,637 civilians killed; c. 1,760 civilians injured; 50,000 homes destroyed or damaged	40 bombers destroyed; 150 aircrew

The Baedeker Blitz or Baedeker raids was a series of bombing raids by the Luftwaffe on the United Kingdom during World War II in April and May 1942. Towns and cities in England were targeted for their cultural value as part of a demoralisation campaign.

The Luftwaffe planned the raids in response to the Royal Air Force's (RAF) area bombing offensive against Nazi Germany as a result of the area bombing directive, starting with the bombing of Lübeck in March 1942. Bombers of Luftflotte 3 under the command of Hugo Sperrle attacked sites such as cathedrals, health resorts, and town halls. The aim was to begin a "tit-for-tat" exchange with the hope of demoralising the British public and forcing the RAF to reduce their attacks on Germany. The name derives from Baedeker, a series of German tourist guide books used to select targets for bombing.

The Baedeker Blitz was a strategic failure – German damage to British cities was minimal compared to The Blitz or the RAF bombing raids against Germany, and the Luftwaffe suffered from unsustainable losses. Over 1,600 civilians were killed and tens of thousands of homes were damaged in the main raids. Towns and cities in England continued to be targeted by the Luftwaffe for their cultural value and killing thousands more civilians over the following two years.

== Background ==
By the winter of 1941, both the British and German strategic bombing campaigns had reached a poor state. The German offensive against the British, a nine-month period of night bombing known as The Blitz, had left London and many other British cities heavily damaged. The Blitz came to an end in May 1941 when the Luftwaffe had prioritised its resources towards the German invasion of the Soviet Union. Thereafter, it had confined itself to hit-and-run raids on British coastal towns. Meanwhile, the RAF's night bombing offensive against Germany had been shown to be largely ineffective, as revealed by the Butt Report in August 1941, and by Christmas such attacks had largely petered out.

When the RAF offensive resumed in March 1942 with the bombing of Lübeck, there was a marked change in effectiveness. New heavy bombers were introduced such as the Short Stirling and Handley Page Halifax, followed by the unreliable Avro Manchester from which was developed the excellent Lancaster. Improved navigation systems such as Gee and Oboe allowed the RAF to strike better at their targets. The appointment of Air Vice-Marshal Arthur Harris as chief of RAF Bomber Command saw greater enthusiasm for area bombing attacks of German cities, with new tactics such as the bomber stream, the use of incendiary bombs, and particularly area bombardment. Prior to this the RAF had attempted to conduct precision bombing, aiming at individual factories, power stations, even post offices, in multiple strikes across Germany, which had been costly and ineffective. Following the example of the Luftwaffe's bombing of Coventry in November 1940, the RAF began concentrating a single blow against an area where several worthwhile targets existed, including the homes and morale of the civilian population living there.

== Planning ==
The leadership and population in Nazi Germany were shocked by the destruction of Lübeck, and of Rostock the following month. Up to this point they had been mostly unaffected by the RAF's bombing campaign. Now, Joseph Goebbels reported, "the damage was really enormous" and "it is horrible ... the English air raids have increased in scope and importance; if they can be continued for weeks on these lines, they might conceivably have a demoralising effect on the population." After the bombing of Rostock he reported "the air raid ... was more devastating than those before. Community life there is practically at an end ... the situation is in some sections catastrophic ... seven-tenths of the city have been destroyed ... more than 100,000 people had to be evacuated ... there was, in fact, panic".

Adolf Hitler was enraged, and demanded that the Luftwaffe retaliate accordingly. On 14 April 1942, he ordered "that the air war against England be given a more aggressive stamp. Accordingly when targets are being selected, preference is to be given to those where attacks are likely to have the greatest possible effect on civilian life. Besides raids on ports and industry, terror attacks of a retaliatory nature [Vergeltungsangriffe] are to be carried out on towns other than London".

After the raid on Bath, Goebbels reported that Hitler intended to "repeat these raids night after night until the English are sick and tired of terror attacks" and that he "shared [Goebbels'] opinion absolutely that cultural centres, health resorts and civilian centres must be attacked ... there is no other way of bringing the English to their senses. They belong to a class of human beings with whom you can only talk after you have first knocked out their teeth."

== Name ==
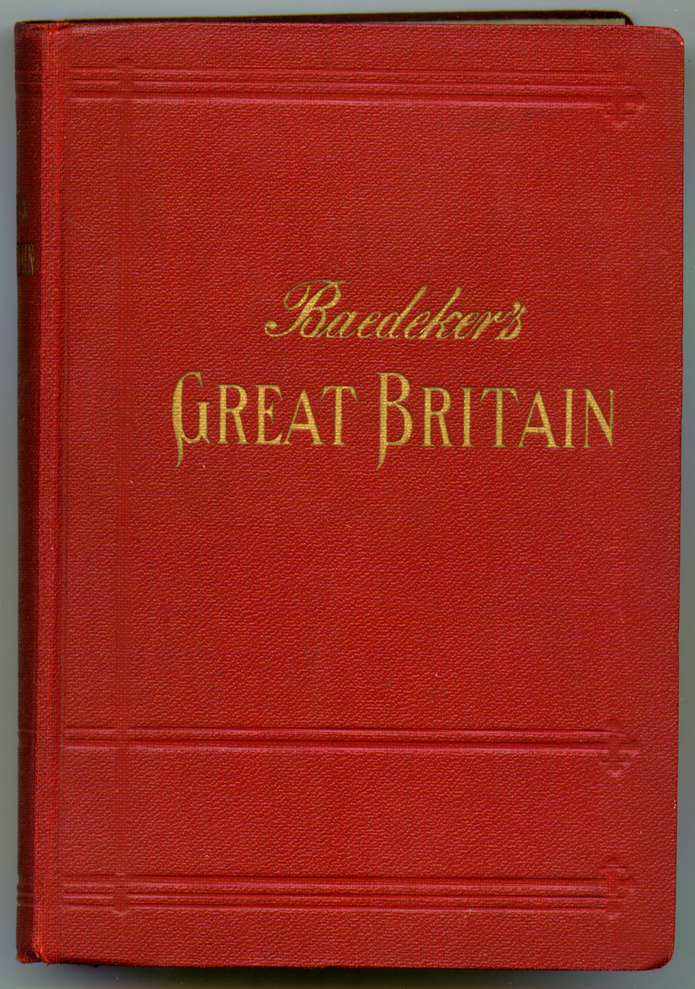
Baedeker's Great Britain guide for 1937

The raids were referred to on both sides as Baedeker raids, derived from a comment by a German propagandist. Gustaf Braun von Stumm, a spokesman for the German Foreign Office, is reported to have said on 24 April 1942, "We shall go out and bomb every building in Britain marked with three stars in the Baedeker Guide", a reference to the popular German travel guides, Baedeker Guides. Goebbels was furious and keen to brand British attacks as "terror bombing", he was equally keen to designate German efforts as "retaliatory measures". Stumm's off-the-cuff remark "effectively admitted the Germans were targetting cultural and historic targets, just what the German leadership did not want to do, and Goebbels took steps to make sure it did not happen again".

The British Ministry of Economic Warfare issued the Bomber's Baedeker in 1943, a methodical analysis of bombing targets in Germany, in reference to Stumm's comment. A second edition followed in 1944.

== Raids ==
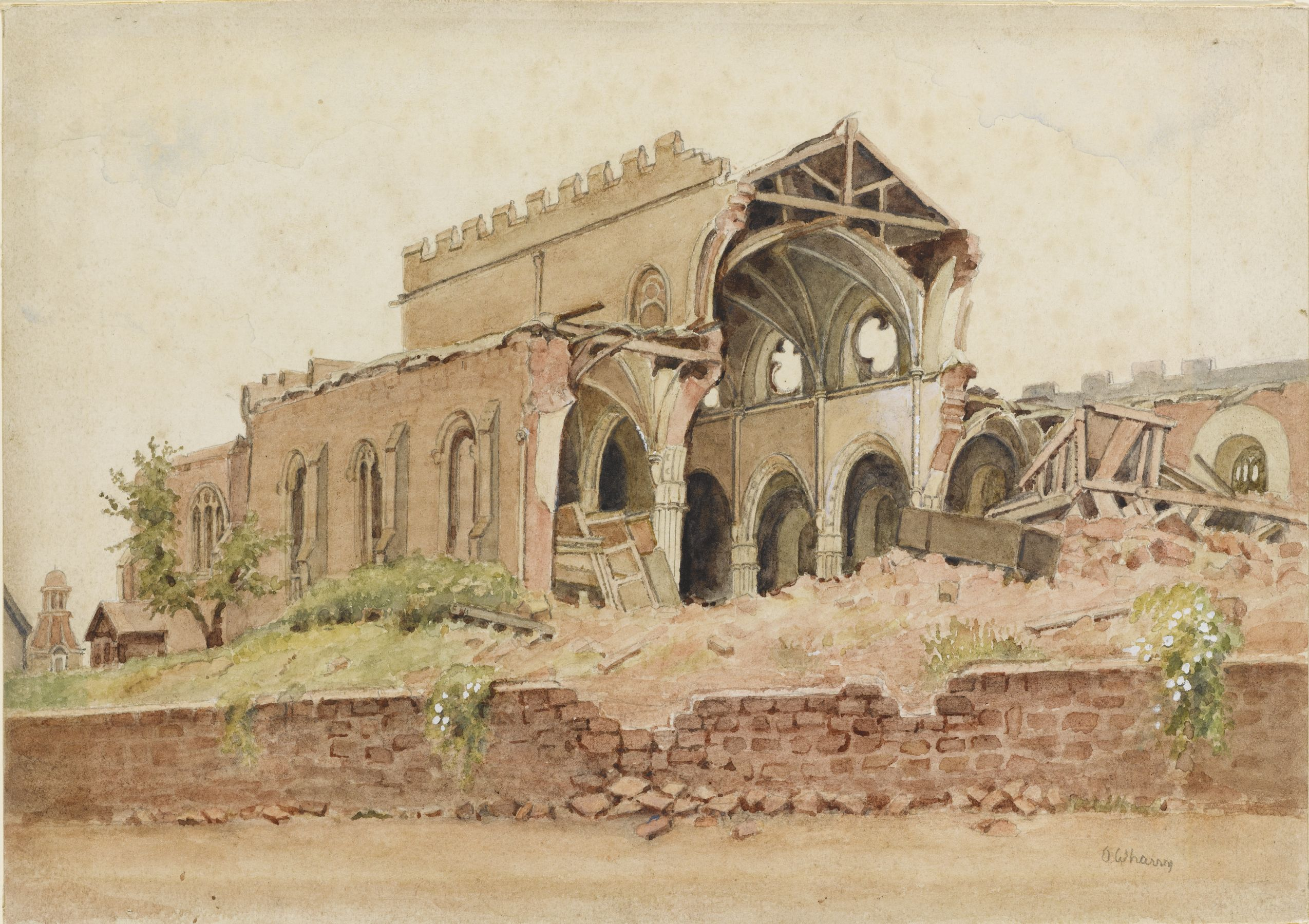
Watercolour by Olive Wharry circa 1942 of St. Sidwell's Church, Exeter, after the Blitz. In the early hours of 4th May 1942 a 250 kg (550 lb) bomb fell directly on St Sidwells. The church tower was left standing but was so badly damaged that it was pulled down shortly after. A replacement church was built on the site.

The task of carrying out the attacks was given to the Luftflotte 3 bomber groups KG 2 and KG 6, formed from the earlier Küstenfliegergruppe 106 maritime aviation group, to be led by the pathfinders of I./KG 100. Each raid involved 30 to 40 aircraft, and to increase their effectiveness it was planned each would fly two sorties per night. Each raid involved two periods of 60 to 90 minutes, separated by two or three hours.

The Exeter Blitz, the first raid of the Baedeker Blitz, was directed against Exeter, the ancient county town of Devon with its immense heritage of historic buildings, on the night of Saint George's Day, 23/24 April 1942. While this raid caused little damage, a second raid the following night was more severe, with over 80 fatalities. On the nights of 25/26 and 26/27 April, the bomber force conducted the Bath Blitz, causing widespread damage to Bath and some 400 casualties. These raids came a month after the Lübeck raid and coincided with the RAF's four-night offensive against Rostock. On 27/28 April, the Luftwaffe attacked Norwich, dropping more than 90 tonnes (200,000 lb) of bombs and causing 67 deaths. On 28/29 April, they attacked York, causing limited damage but 79 deaths.

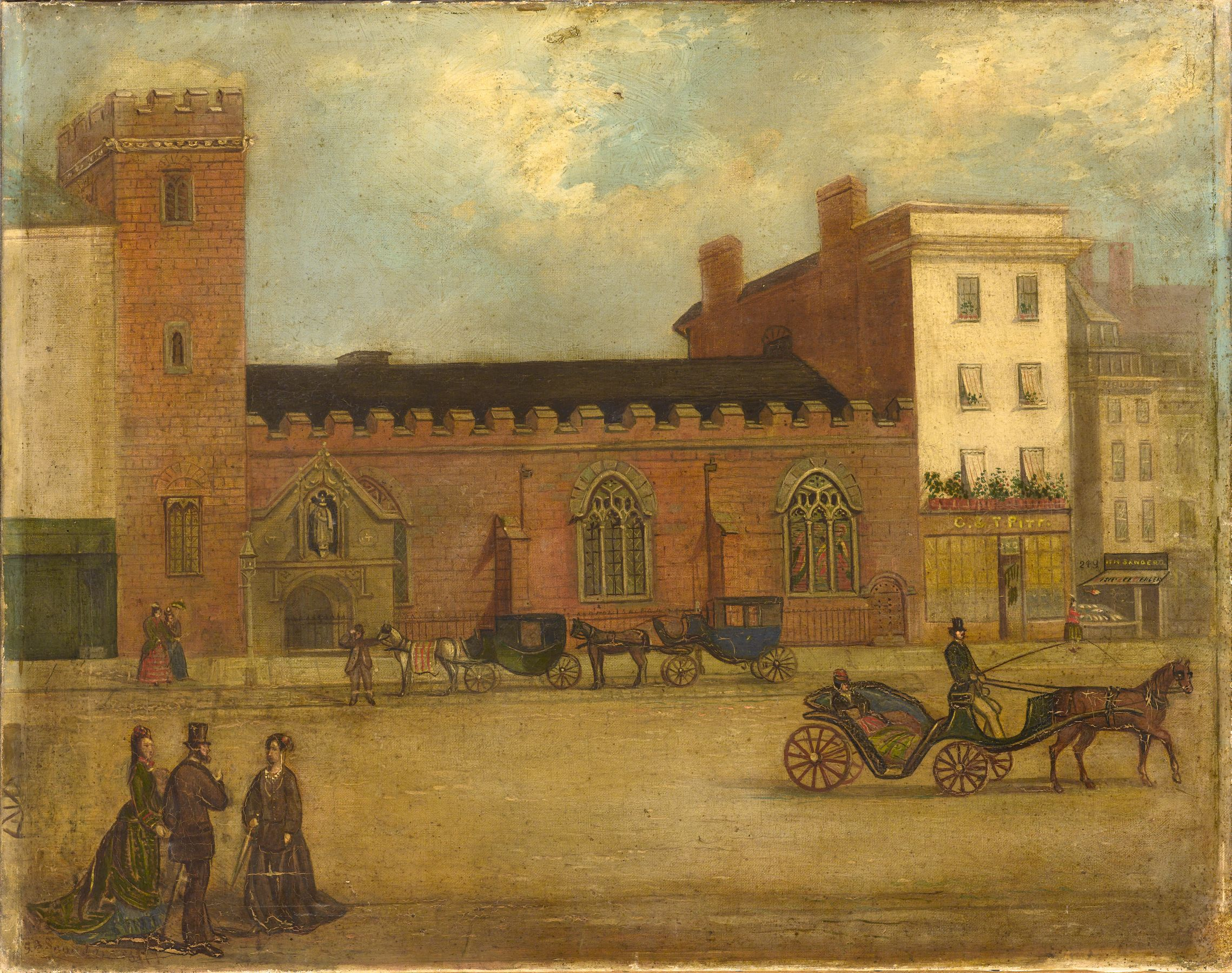
St Lawrence Church in Exeter painted by an unknown author. This painting depicts Exeter's High Street. St Lawrence Church is in the background. St Lawrence Church, which predated the thirteenth-century, was destroyed on 4 May 1942.

On the night of 3/4 May, the Luftwaffe returned to Exeter, causing heavy damage to the city centre, considerable damage to the south side of Exeter Cathedral, and 164 deaths. The following night they attacked Cowes on the Isle of Wight, a target of both cultural and military value, being the home of the J. Samuel White shipyard. On 8/9 May, Norwich was attacked again, though the raid was ineffective despite more than 70 aircraft taking part. During May, the Luftwaffe also bombed Hull (a major port, and thus a military target) Poole, Grimsby and, at the end of May, Canterbury. This raid, which coincided with the RAF's first thousand-bomber raid on Cologne, involved 77 bombers, dropping 40 tonnes (88,000 lb) of bombs, which resulted in 43 deaths.

Across all the raids in this period, a total of 1,637 civilians were killed and 1,760 injured, and over 50,000 houses were destroyed. Some notable buildings were destroyed or damaged, including York's Guildhall and the Bath Assembly Rooms, but on the whole most escaped – Norwich Cathedral, Canterbury Cathedral, and York Minster included. Exeter Cathedral was hit in the early hours of 4 May with the complete destruction of St James Chapel on the south side and considerable damage to the South Quire Aisle.

On 27 April, Winston Churchill told the War Cabinet that the government should do all it could to "ensure that disproportionate publicity was not given to these raids" and "avoid giving the impression that the Germans were making full reprisal" for British raids.

== Aftermath ==
The Baedeker Blitz was a strategic failure for the Germans as the Luftwaffe suffered heavy losses for minimal damage inflicted and demoralisation of the British public. The Axis's need for reinforcements in the North African campaign and on the Eastern Front meant further operations could only continue at a reduced scale, with mostly intermittent hit-and-run raids on coastal towns by Focke-Wulf Fw 190 fighter-bombers. Whilst the term Baedeker Blitz is sometimes limited to the raids on those five cities (Exeter, Bath, Canterbury, Norwich and York) in April and May 1942, the Luftwaffe continued to target cities for their cultural value for the next two years.

=== Continued raids ===
In June 1942, they attacked Ipswich, Poole and Canterbury again, Southampton (a port target), Norwich again, and Weston-super-Mare. In July, there were three raids on Birmingham, another three on Middlesbrough, and one on Hull, all industrial cities of military and strategic value. In August, the Germans returned to "Baedeker" targets: Norwich, Swansea, Colchester and Ipswich.

In September, they attacked Sunderland, a port and industrial centre, and King's Lynn, a market town of no military value. All these raids were less intense than those of April and May, involving some 20 aircraft apiece. This reflected the steady and increasing losses suffered by the Germans as the RAF's night-fighter defences improved and German casualties mounted. By the autumn, KG 2 had lost 65 of its 88 crews and the offensive had come to a halt. To find new ways to continue the pressure, the Luftwaffe experimented with both low-level and very high-level attacks. In August 1942, two modified Junkers Ju 86P bombers were employed making high-altitude runs over southern England. These operated with impunity for several weeks, and one raid on Bristol on 28 August resulted in 48 fatalities. These flights were halted when the RAF fielded a similarly modified flight of Supermarine Spitfires and caught one of these bombers in the highest air battle of the war.

On 31 October 1942, thirty German fighter-bombers escorted by sixty fighters made a low-level attack on Canterbury, dropping 28 bombs on the city and causing 30 deaths. Three of the attacking aircraft were shot down.

By the end of 1942, 3,236 people had been killed and 4,148 injured in these raids. However, the strength of the Luftwaffe in the Western Front had drained away while the RAF had gone from strength to strength, regularly mounting raids of 200 or more aircraft on Germany.

In 1943, the Luftwaffe in the west was revitalised and Luftflotte 3 brought back up to strength. In January, KG 2 had 60 Dornier Do 217 bombers and KG 6 the same number of Junkers Ju 88s. These were reinforced with a fast bomber wing, SKG 10 of Fw 190 fighter-bombers. These renewed the offensive. On 17/18 January 1943 they raided London, followed by a low-level attack on the city on 20 January. After a lull in February, they returned in March leading to the Bethnal Green Tube disaster, where 178 people died. Throughout the year, raids were made on a variety of targets; some of strategic value (Southampton, Plymouth, Portsmouth, Hull, Sunderland, Newcastle) and others with little or none (Eastbourne, Hastings, Maidstone, Cheltenham, Chelmsford, Bournemouth, Lincoln). Again, new tactics were tried. In June 1943, a raid on Grimsby saw the use of delayed-action anti-personnel "butterfly bombs", which resulted in 163 civilian casualties, most of them from these devices as people returned to their homes after the all clear was sounded.

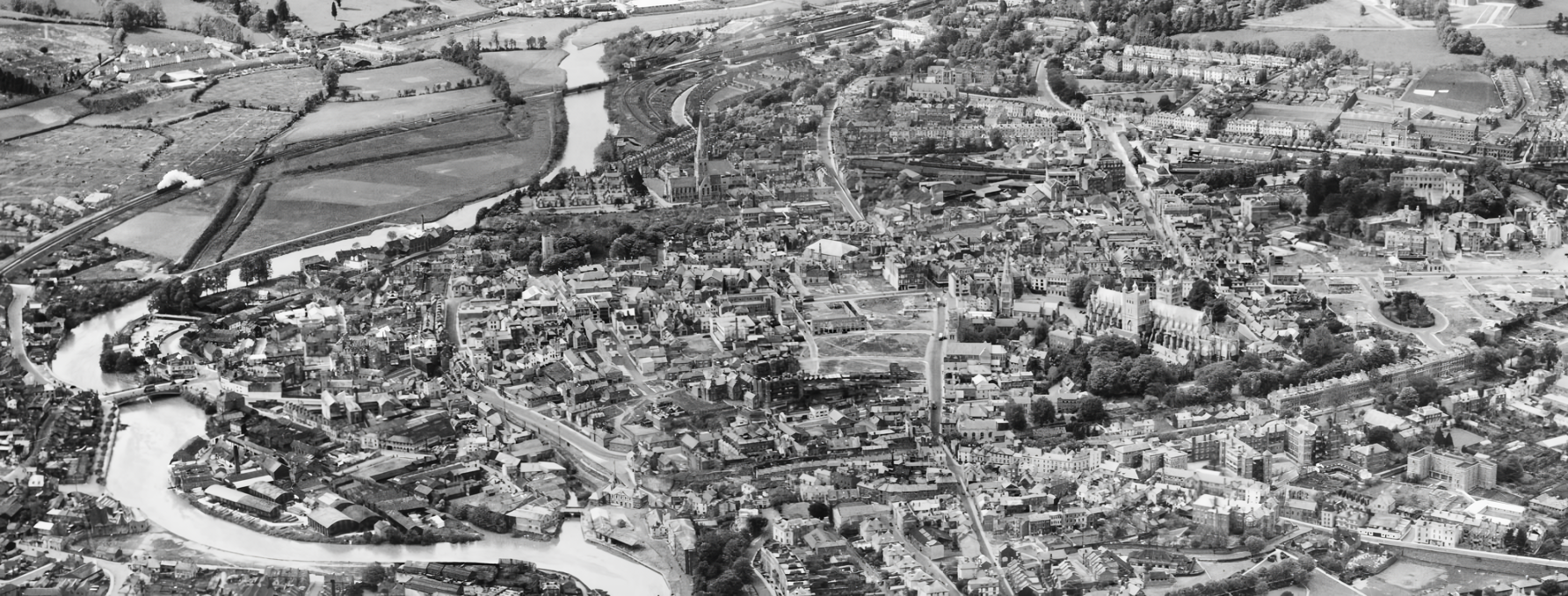
Exeter in the late 1940s

In November 1943, following the RAF and United States Army Air Forces' bombing of Hamburg and the first use of the "Window" radar countermeasure, the Luftwaffe were able to respond with a raid on Norwich using Duppel, their equivalent. While British radar was negated, the raid caused little damage. With the continuing losses of experienced personnel, the German crews were increasingly made up of inexperienced replacements, with a corresponding drop in effectiveness. By the end of 1943, the Luftwaffe had mounted some 20 raids, in which more than 10 tonnes (22,000 lb) of bombs had been dropped, a total of 2,360 tonnes (5.2 million pounds) for the whole year. These caused 2,372 deaths and 3,450 injuries, according to a report by Lord Cherwell. The report contrasted this with the RAF's achievement of a total of 138,000 tonnes (300 million pounds) dropped during the year, and pointed out that a single raid on Berlin made in the same week that the report was published had dropped 2,520 tonnes (5.6 million pounds), more than the entire German effort. The report pointed out that these raids were confined to towns on or near the coast, and that fires caused by bombing only accounted for one-thirtieth of all the incidents dealt with by the National Fire Service.

The Baedeker-type raids ended in 1944, as the Germans realised they were ineffective; unsustainable losses were being suffered for no material gain. A switch to London as the principal target for retaliation was made in January 1944. The Luftwaffe mounted Operation Steinbock, an all-out attack on London employing all of its available bomber force in the west, on 21 January. This too was largely a failure, with heavy losses for little gain. Henceforth, efforts were re-directed toward the ports that the Germans suspected were going to be used for the allied invasion of France, while the assault on London became the domain of Germany's V-weapons.

== See also ==
- Strategic bombing during World War II
- Operation Diver
- Operation Gisela
