= Westwood, Wiltshire =

Village in Wiltshire, England

Coordinates: 51.330°N 02.271°W

Westwood
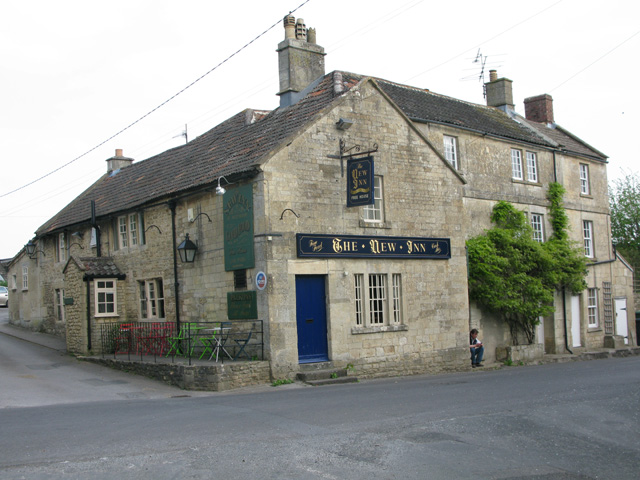
- The New Inn, Westwood, in 2011

- Location within Wiltshire
- Population: 1,120 (in 2011)
- OS grid reference: ST812590
- Unitary authority: Wiltshire
- Ceremonial county: Wiltshire
- Region: South West
- Country: England
- Sovereign state: United Kingdom
- Post town: BRADFORD-ON-AVON
- Postcode district: BA15
- Dialling code: 01225
- Police: Wiltshire
- Fire: Dorset and Wiltshire
- Ambulance: South Western
- UK Parliament: Melksham and Devizes
- Website: Parish Council

Westwood is a large village and a civil parish in west Wiltshire, England. The village is about 1.4 miles (2.3 km) southwest of the town of Bradford-on-Avon.

Upper Westwood, on a ridge crest to the north, was a distinct settlement from Lower Westwood but 20th-century housing filled the gap. The parish includes most of the village of Avoncliff, namely the portion south of the Avon, and the hamlet of Lye Green.

== Location ==
The Avon forms most of the northern boundary of the parish; Avoncliff railway station is just over the boundary. The Kennet and Avon canal crosses the parish to the north, as far as the Avoncliff Aqueduct. To the northeast lies Bradford on Avon parish, and to the west is the county boundary with Somerset which follows the valley of the River Frome.

Neighbouring villages are Winsley and Turleigh to the north, and Freshford to the west.

== History ==
Westwood's recorded history begins in 983 AD, when King Ethelred's charters granted various pieces of land to his servant Aelfnoth, and four years later to his huntsman Leofwine. In Norman times, Westwood was one of the estates assigned for the support of the monks at Winchester Cathedral, and the residents of the manor continued to be tenants of Winchester until it was dissolved by Henry VIII. The medieval population of Westwood, as recorded in Domesday Book of 1086, consisted of just 13 households, growing to 45 recorded taxpayers in the late 14th century.

Mills were built on the Avon at Avoncliff, and on the Frome at Iford, and were most active in cloth-making and fulling from the 16th century.

The parish gained 116 acres on the break-up and abolition of Bradford Without civil parish in 1934.

=== Quarries ===
The earliest records of a substantial quarrying industry at Westwood are in 1649. By the mid-19th century, the quality of Westwood stone had earned a good reputation, and over the next half-century, output increased at a great rate. Westwood stone went to build many houses in Bath, as well as Holy Trinity church in Trowbridge (1838). A narrow-gauge railway was constructed to transport the huge blocks of rough cut stone from the quarry to the cutting-yard at Avoncliff railway station.

Nowadays, all that remains from the centuries of intensive quarrying is the labyrinth of tunnels, eight feet high and twelve feet wide. They have been put to a number of imaginative uses, especially after they were taken over by the Ministry of Supply in 1939. For example, the eastern part of the quarry tunnels had since 1928 been used for growing mushrooms, as the relatively stable ambient temperatures and the high humidity of the underground were found perfectly suitable. From 1941, about six hundred workers manufactured gun-control equipment at an underground factory which had been located in the tunnels to defend against Luftwaffe raids. Additionally, by the end of 1942 the Westwood tunnels had "probably housed the greatest and most valuable collection of cultural and artistic artifacts assembled in one location anywhere in the world", including exhibits from the British Museum, pictures from the National Portrait Gallery, tapestries from the Victoria and Albert Museum, the Elgin Marbles, and the Wright brothers' aeroplane. An air conditioning plant had to be installed to control the humidity underground.

== Local government ==
The civil parish elects a parish council. It is in the area of Wiltshire Council, a unitary authority which is responsible for all significant local government functions; the parish forms part of the council's Winsley and Westwood electoral division.

== Religious sites ==
=== Parish church ===
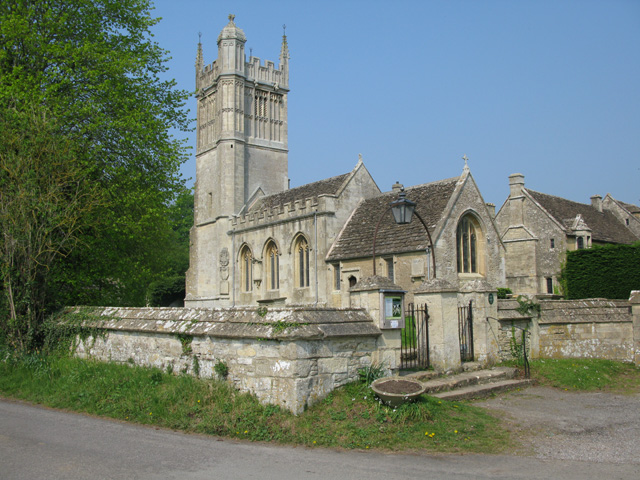
St Mary's Church

A chapelry of Bradford-on-Avon at Westwood was mentioned in 1299. The present church, now dedicated to St Mary the Virgin, was built in ashlar rubble in the 15th century; restoration in 1840 included rebuilding the south side of the chancel. A reused stone over a door in the north wall of the chancel may be from the late 12th or early 13th century. There is 15th-century stained glass in the chancel.

The church was designated as Grade I listed in 1962. Pevsner describes the elaborately decorated 16th-century west tower as "splendid"; at its southeast corner is a prominent octagonal stair turret with a domed top.

In 1876, Westwood was constituted as a parish and separated from Bradford. In 1975 a group ministry centred on Holy Trinity at Bradford was formed, which continues today as the benefice of Bradford on Avon Holy Trinity, Westwood and Wingfield.

=== Former chapels ===
The stone-quarrying community at Upper Westwood was largely Methodist. A Wesleyan Methodist chapel was opened there in 1862 and closed circa 1960.

A Baptist chapel was opened at Lower Westwood in 1865 and extended with a schoolroom, with capacity for 200 children, in 1885. At first a Sunday school, the room later became the infant school for the village, continuing until 1976 when a new school was built on a different site.

== Notable buildings ==
Westwood Manor, in Lower Westwood next to the church, is a Grade I listed 15th-century manor house owned by the National Trust. Greenhill House in Upper Westwood is from the 18th century and is Grade II* listed.

Iford Manor, in the Frome valley, is a Grade II* listed manor house from the 15th or 16th century; its gardens by Harold Peto, who lived there from 1899, are Grade I listed. The gardens were the setting for an annual summer music festival, the Iford Arts Festival, until 2019 when the festival moved to a higher-capacity venue at Bradford-on-Avon.

A group of 1790s three-storey weavers' houses next to the canal at Avoncliffe was bought in 1835 by the guardians of the Bradford Poor Law Union, and converted into a workhouse with capacity for 250; a chapel was added and later a schoolroom. The building was sold in 1923, used for a time as a hotel, and converted into houses in the 1980s.

== Amenities ==
The Parish Rooms, next to the Church of St Mary the Virgin, is used by the church after services and is available for private hire.

The Social Club, between Lower and Upper Westwood, is a paid members club and is home to a local skittles league.
