= Winsley =

Village in Wiltshire, England

Coordinates: 51.348°N 2.286°W

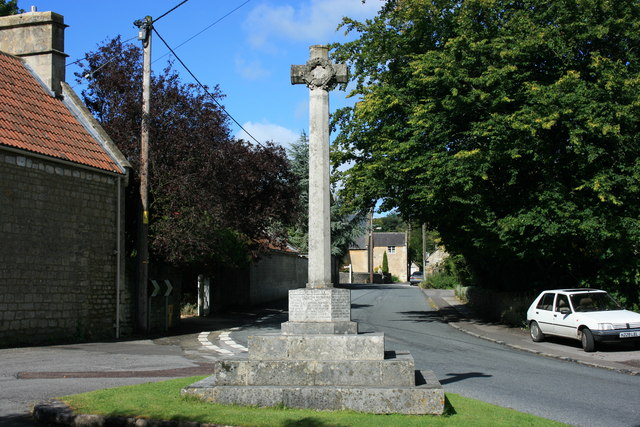
- War Memorial at the village centre, restored in 2014 for the centennial anniversary of the start of WW1

- Location within Wiltshire
- Population: 1,920 (2011 census)
- OS grid reference: ST810611
- Civil parish: Winsley
- Unitary authority: Wiltshire
- Ceremonial county: Wiltshire
- Region: South West
- Country: England
- Sovereign state: United Kingdom
- Post town: Bradford-on-Avon
- Postcode district: BA15
- Dialling code: 01225
- Police: Wiltshire
- Fire: Dorset and Wiltshire
- Ambulance: South Western
- UK Parliament: Melksham and Devizes
- Website: Winsley Community

Winsley is a large village and civil parish about 2 miles (3 km) west of Bradford on Avon in Wiltshire, England.

The parish includes the hamlets of Conkwell, Turleigh, Little Ashley and Great Ashley.

== History ==
The area was probably farmed in Roman times, as it lay between the town of Aquae Sulis (now Bath) and a villa complex at Bradford. Winsley is not mentioned in Domesday Book, being included with Bradford. The Bradford estate was granted to St Mary's Abbey, Winchester in 955 and then in 1001 to Shaftesbury Abbey. The Wiltshire Victoria County History has an account of later owners.

Winsley is first recorded (as Winesley) in 1242 although the name is Saxon in origin. Other settlements around this time were Haugh, Ashley, Hartleigh and Turleigh. Stone quarrying became important from the 18th century, with quarries at Conkwell and at Murhill, where from 1803 stone for the canal was carried by wagons down a wooden railway. The 1841 census found 105 labourers working in stone quarries at Winsley. Later in that century, with transport of stone made easier by the railways, several stone mining firms operated in the area including Randell & Saunders at Murhill Down.

Winsley Sanatorium was opened in 1905, just west of the village on the hilltop site of a former quarry as fresh air was desired for treatment of tuberculosis and similar illnesses. By 1929 it was known as Winsley Chest Hospital, and by 1934 had been enlarged to house 134 patients; from 1948 patients with mental handicaps were treated. The hospital closed in 1982. Avonpark retirement village was built there in 1994 using some of the hospital buildings, and is now owned by Retirement Villages Group Ltd.

=== Dorothy House ===
Winsley House, off Bradford Road in the south-west of the village, may have 17th- century origins. The Sutcliffe School for Boys bought and converted the house in 1953, and added school buildings in the grounds. After the school closed in 1992 the site was bought by the Dorothy House charity, which provides at-home medical care and a hospice for people with chronic or life-limiting illnesses. The charity covers the Bath and Keynsham areas, east Somerset and parts of north and west Wiltshire.

== Geography ==
Winsley is distinctly split into Old Winsley village and newer housing estates: the 1960s Tyning estate to the northeast and the 1980s Church Farm estate to the northwest. The B3108 road from Bradford to Limpley Stoke originally passed through the village but a relief road avoiding the narrow roads and double bends was completed in 1997.

The Avon forms the western and southern boundaries of the parish. To the east is Bradford on Avon parish; in the northwest and southwest is the boundary with the county of Somerset, administratively Bath and North East Somerset. The land rises steeply from the river valley, and the village is about 300 feet (91 m) above the river.

The Kennet and Avon Canal follows the path of the river, and is mostly on the Winsley side of the parish boundary. The canal crosses the river on Avoncliff Aqueduct in the south of the parish, and again on Dundas Aqueduct in the west.

== Governance ==
The civil parish elects a parish council. It is in the area of Wiltshire Council unitary authority, which is responsible for all significant local government functions. The parish is part of the Winsley & Westwood electoral division, which elects one member of Wiltshire Council; the division also covers Wingfield, Westwood, Limpley Stoke, Monkton Farleigh and South Wraxall parishes.

For Westminster elections, the parish is within the Melksham and Devizes constituency.

Winsley formed part of the ancient hundred of Bradford, which was divided into civil parishes in 1894.

== Amenities ==
On the Tyning Estate, built in the 1960s, a GP practice with a dispensary are next to the Church of England primary school.

In the old village with its manor house and many 17th-century houses and artisans' cottages, the village hall, St Nicholas' parish church, a Methodist church (built 1902) and a bowls club, are around the village pub. Winsley Cricket Club is next to the Manor House grounds overlooking the Avon Valley, while Bradford on Avon Rugby Football Club is northeast of the village. There is a farm shop and café at Hartley Farm, north of the village.

Bus service D1 passes through the village, with a regular timetable throughout the day serving Bath, Trowbridge and Warminster. The railway towards Bath and Bristol passes to the south and west of the parish, following the river valley; Avoncliff station is within the parish and Freshford is just outside.

Murhill Bank (John Presland Nature Reserve), on the western edge of the village, is a steeply sloping area of woodland with a one-acre unimproved (never farmed) meadow. It is maintained as a nature reserve by the parish council, who bought the site in 1987. Underground stone quarries nearby which provide hibernation places for bats are designated as the Winsley Mines Site of Special Scientific Interest, forming part of the Bath and Bradford-on-Avon Bats Special Area of Conservation which is important for three species of bats.

== Parish church ==
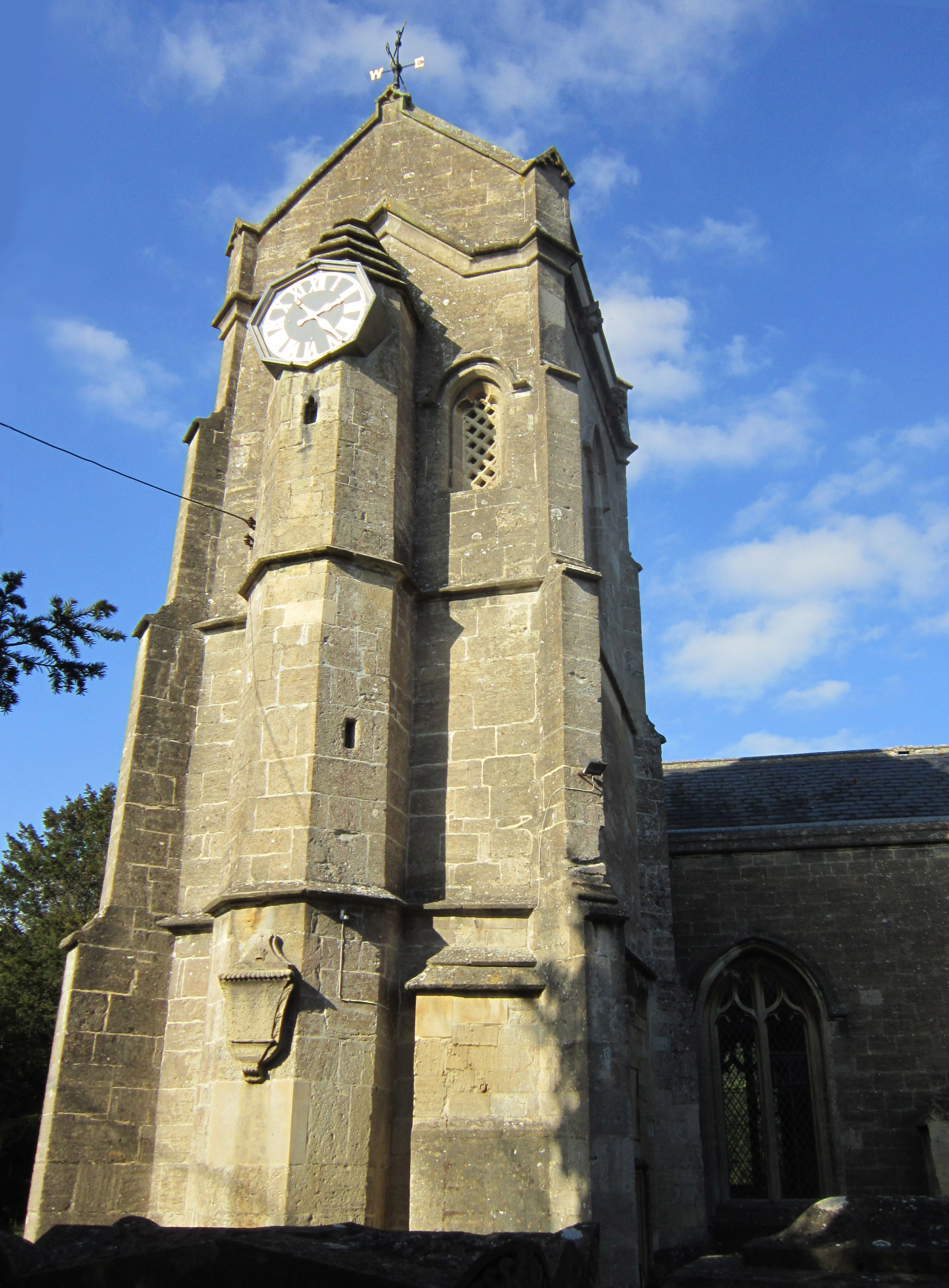
Belltower of St. Nicholas' parish church

There was a chapel at Winsley in 1349, one of several dependent on Holy Trinity parish church at Bradford. By 1841 the church was felt to be too small and in need of repair, and it was rebuilt at the instigation of Rev. Harvey of Bradford and the Winsley chapelwarden, James Baber, owner of Murhill stone quarry and other local properties. They engaged Bristol architect R. S. Pope who designed an aisle-less nave and chancel in Gothic style; the 15th-century tower was retained, linked by a short passage to the southwest corner of the new church. Pevsner describes the tower as "quite unusual in its composition, with the mid stair-turret and the saddleback roof".

The font is 15th-century but Pevsner describes the interior as otherwise uninspired. The tower had three bells in 1553, of which the treble cast in 1545 by Thomas Gefferies survives; the others were made or recast in 1756 (by Thomas Bilbie) and 1951. Bilbie probably also made the clock bell.

In 1846 the chapelries of Winsley and Limpley Stoke were united to form a parish, at first a perpetual curacy, then from 1868 deemed to be a vicarage. The union with Limpley Stoke was severed in 1970 when that parish was united with Freshford, Somerset. Today the church is part of the benefice of North Bradford-on-Avon and Villages, alongside St James at South Wraxall, St Peter at Monkton Farleigh and Christ Church, Bradford.

== Notable people ==
The science fiction and fantasy writer Jonathan Green grew up in the village.
