= Avoncliff railway station =

Railway station in Wiltshire, England

Avoncliff
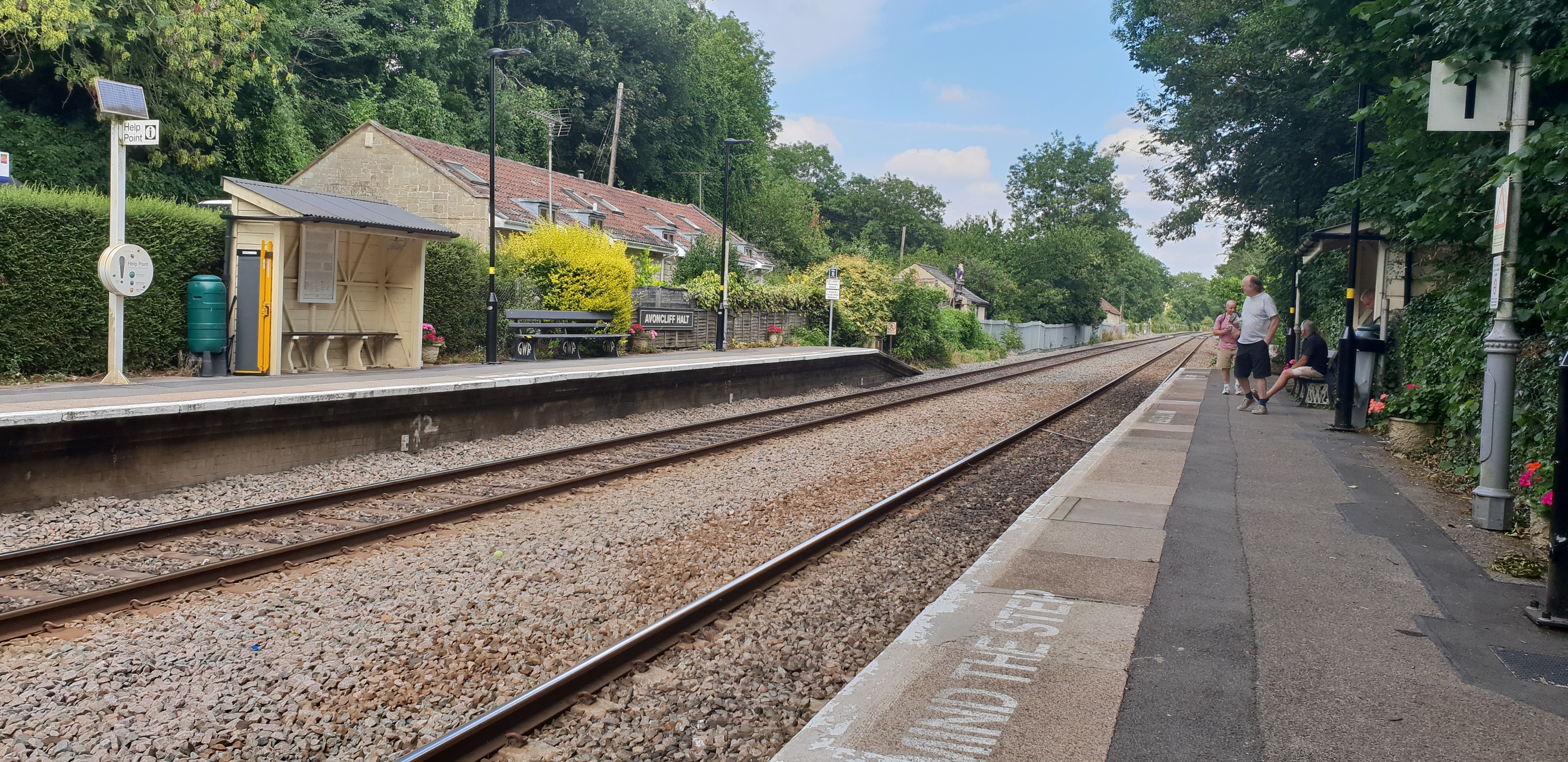

General information
- Location: Avoncliff, Wiltshire; England
- Coordinates: 51.3395°N 2.2821°W
- Grid reference: ST804600
- Manager: Great Western Railway
- Platforms: 2

Other information
- Station code: AVF
- Classification: DfT category F2

History
- Original company: Great Western Railway

Key dates
- 9 July 1906: Station opens as Avoncliff Halt
- 5 May 1969: Station renamed Avoncliff

Passengers
- 2021/22: ▲18,812
- 2022/23: ▲23,402
- 2023/24: ▲24,136
- 2024/25: ▲25,078
- 2025/26: ▲26,562
Location
Notes
- Passenger statistics from the Office of Rail and Road

Avoncliff railway station serves the small village of Avoncliff, in Wiltshire, England, together with the nearby villages of Westwood and Winsley, and Turleigh hamlet. Great Western Railway manages the station and operates all services. It is next to the Kennet and Avon Canal and almost adjacent to the Avoncliff Aqueduct, so it is popular with walkers and cyclists who wish to travel along the canal path or the picturesque walks around the station.

The station has two platforms, each long enough for 1 1/2 coaches, with a waiting shelter and original lamp-posts. Residents have voluntarily decorated the station with pots of flowers and, to mark its 100-year anniversary on 9 July 2006, decorated the station with bunting and dressed in Victorian clothing for the celebrations.

== History ==
Opened on the Wessex Main Line by the Great Western Railway as Avoncliff Halt on 9 July 1906, it remained part of that company during the Grouping of 1923. The station then passed to the Western Region of British Railways on nationalisation in 1948.

Avoncliff Halt escaped closure in the 1960s during the Beeching cuts, despite being listed for closure in the 1963 report "The Reshaping of British Railways".

The suffix Halt was dropped from 5 May 1969.

When sectorisation was introduced in the 1980s, the station was served by Regional Railways until the privatisation of British Rail. The station was a request stop until July 2010, when all stops became mandatory.

== Services ==
A generally hourly service is provided by Great Western Railway:

- Northbound to Bath Spa and Bristol Temple Meads
- Southbound to Bradford-on-Avon, Trowbridge and Westbury, with some trains continuing to Weymouth and Southampton Central.

The service is less frequent on Sundays.

Preceding station	National Rail	Following station
Freshford	Great Western Railway; Heart of Wessex Line	Bradford-on-Avon

== Gallery ==
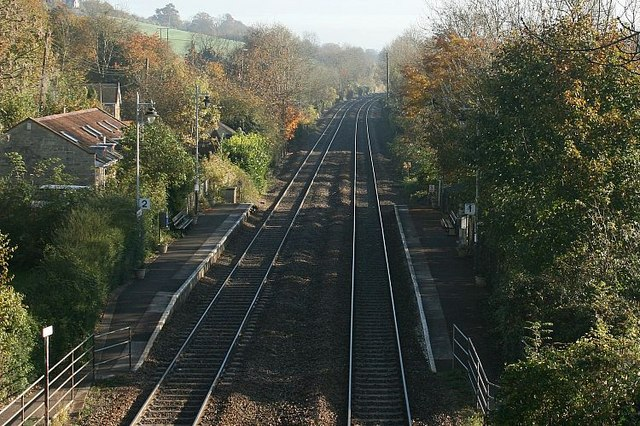
The station seen from the Avoncliff Aqueduct in 2007

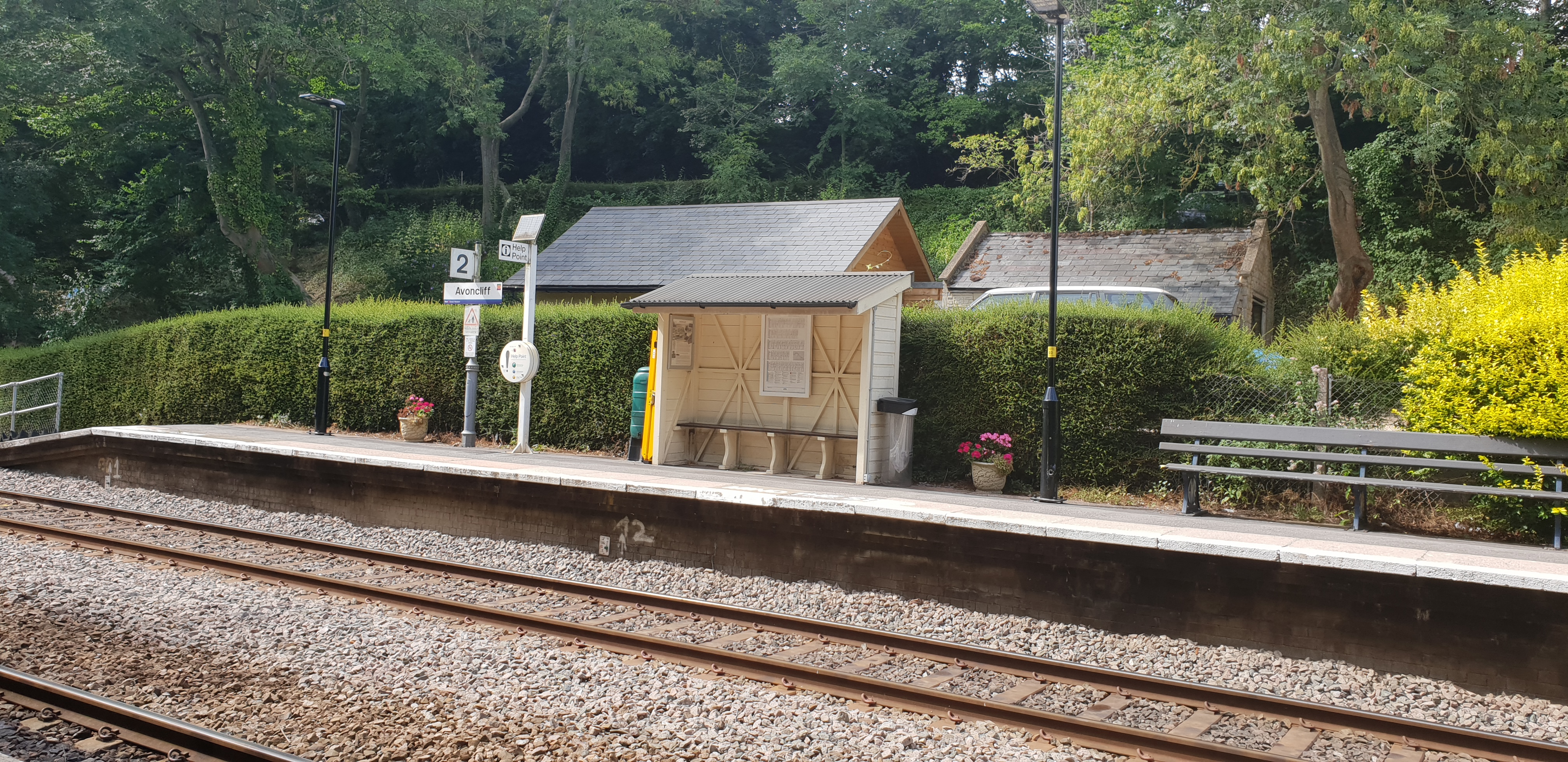
The Bradford-bound platform

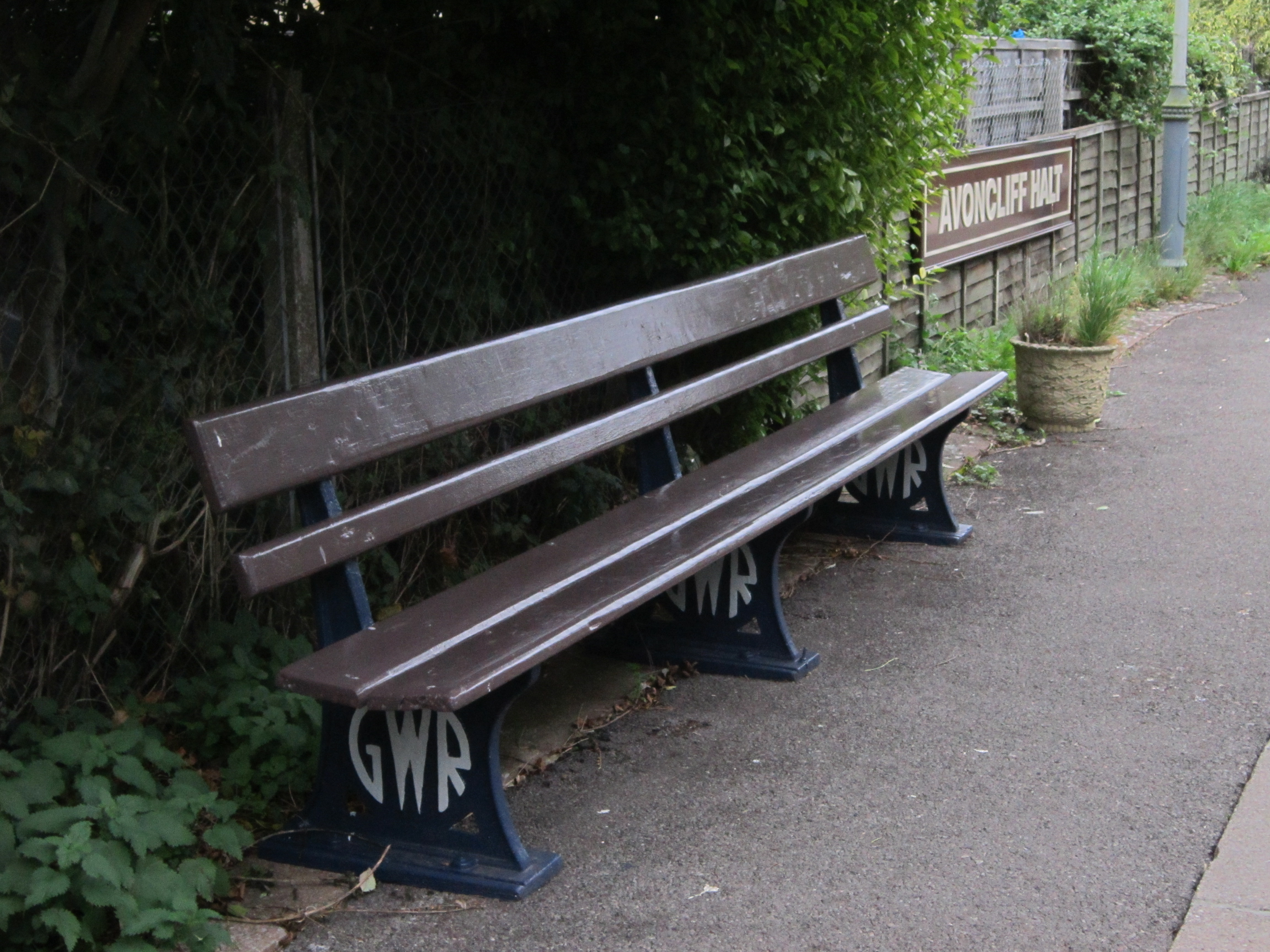
Preserved GWR seat and old station sign

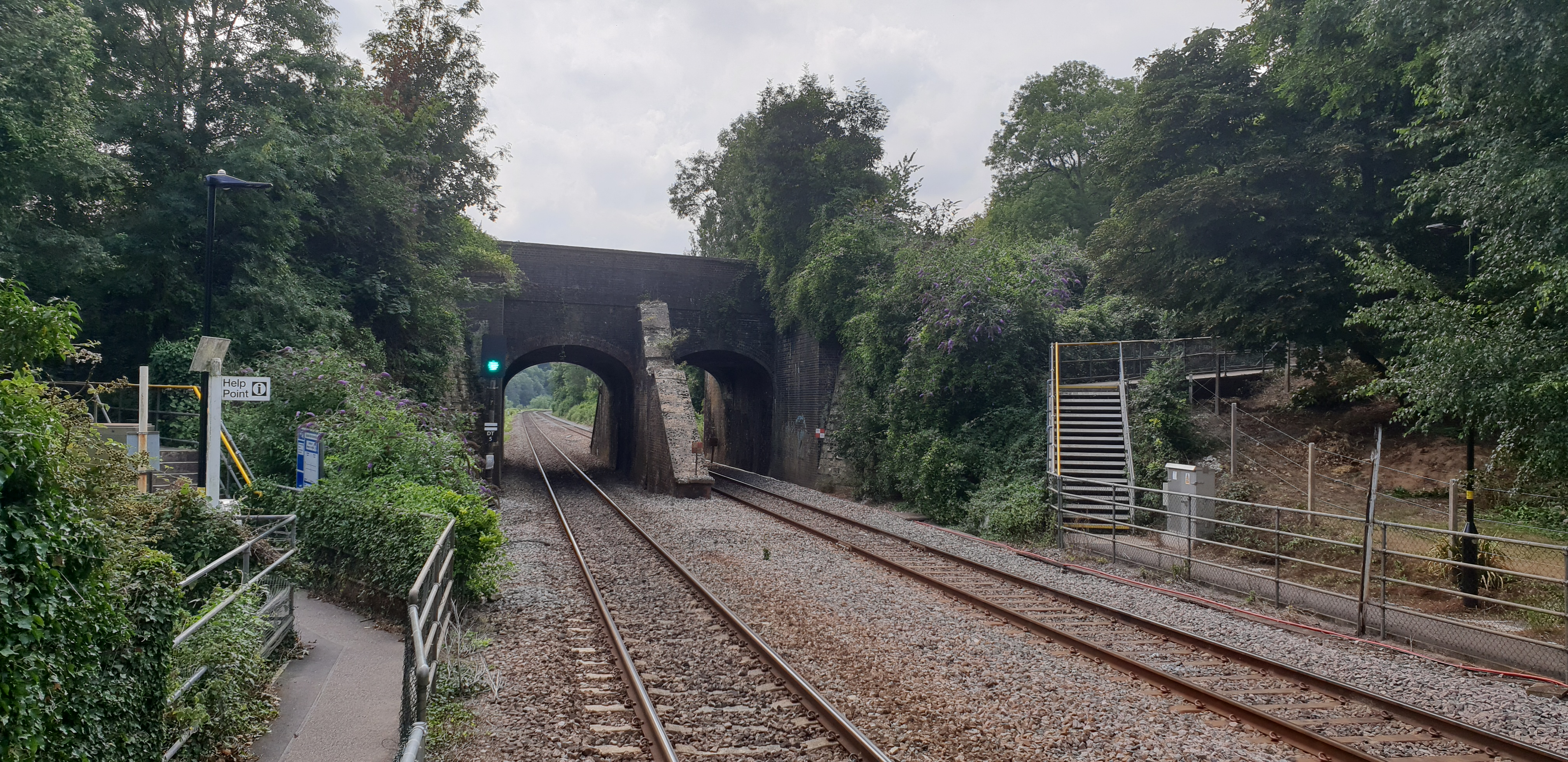
Access to station seen from the platform
