= Freshford =

Freshford may refer to:

- Freshford, County Kilkenny, a village in Ireland
- Freshford, Somerset, a village and civil parish in England
  - Freshford railway station
