= Freshford Manor =

18th century house in Somerset, England

- Location within Somerset
- 51.34035°N 2.30271°W
- Location: Freshford, Somerset, England

History
- Built: Early 18th century

Listed Building – Grade II*
- Official name: Freshford Manor
- Designated: 1 February 1956
- Reference no.: 1115308

Listed Building – Grade II
- Official name: Sir William Napier's Table, in grounds of Freshford Manor, 30 yards to south-east of house
- Designated: 1 February 1956
- Reference no.: 1115309

Listed Building – Grade II
- Official name: Boundary wall and 2 pairs of gatepiers to south of Freshford Manor
- Designated: 19 October 1983
- Reference no.: 1115351

Freshford Manor is an early 18th century house in Freshford, Somerset, England. It is a Grade II* listed building.

The two-storey Cotswold stone house, designed by Thomas Greenway, was built on the site of a previous house. A new wing at the rear of the house was built in the early 19th century and the north wing was added in the 1880s. By the 1950s the house and garden were derelict and under threat of demolition; however, it was bought and restored.

One of the owners was William Francis Patrick Napier who wrote part of his History of the Peninsular War at a stone table in the garden of the house.

== History ==
The house was built in the early 18th century and revised and extended in the late 18th or early 19th century. It was built on the site of an earlier house known as Pittes Place which dated from before 1603. The site was bought by Robert Hayward who employed the architect Thomas Greenway, who had designed several buildings in Bath to design the new building, which was known as Freshford House.

In the early 19th century, while owned by Thomas Joyce, John Pinch the elder was employed to raise the central block and add a new wing at the rear. In 1886 the house was bought by Thomas Player Isaac who was a local architect. He added the north wing and a conservatory. He sold the house to Percival Huth, the son of Charles Frederick Huth. The Huth family lived in the manor house until 1918 when they sold it to Edward and Sarah Hett. After their deaths it was sold in a derelict condition to Herbert Doel in the 1950s who wanted to demolish it and build bungalows, however it was saved and restored. Much of the restoration was led by an American, Dallas Pratt (August 21, 1914 – May 20, 1994) and a Briton, John Judkyn (1913 – July 27, 1963) who together went on to found the American Museum in Britain.

In 2012 an Archimedes' screw was installed in the River Frome to generate electricity for local houses.

A Great Western Railway (GWR) 7800 Class or Manor Class 4-6-0 steam locomotive (number 7813) was named after Freshford Manor.

== Architecture ==
The two-storey building is built in ashlar Cotswold stone, with a slate roof behind a parapet. The five bay front has a projecting porch with Tuscan columns, around the central doorway.

Around 30 yards (27 m) from the house is a stone table approximately 12 feet (3.7 m) long and 6 feet (1.8 m) wide. It is known as "Sir William Napier's Table" as William Francis Patrick Napier wrote part of his History of the Peninsular War sitting at the table.

Within the grounds are magnolias dating from the 19th century. The boundary wall and gatepiers were added in the late 18th century.
