= Mendip =

Mendip may refer to:

- Mendip District, a former local government district of Somerset, England
- Mendip Hills, a group of hills in Somerset, England
  - Mendip Way, a footpath across the Mendip Hills
  - Mendip TV Mast, a transmitter in the Mendips area
- Forest of Mendip, an ancient forest in Somerset, England
- Baron Mendip, a short-lived title of the Peerage of Great Britain
  - Welbore Ellis, 1st Baron Mendip (1713–1802)
- Mendip Power Group, micro electricity generation in the Mendip area
- Mendip Rail, freight operating railway company
- HMS Mendip (L60), a Royal Navy destroyer

== See also ==
- Chewton Mendip, a village in the Mendip Hills
- Mendip Times, a monthly magazine in the Mendip and Somerset area
- Mendip Vale railway station, western terminus of the East Somerset Railway
- Mendips (disambiguation)
