= Friary, Somerset =

Hamlet in Somerset, England

Coordinates: 51.3313°N 2.3049°W

Friary
- Part of Friary shown within Friary Wood

- Location within Somerset
- Population: ~17
- OS grid reference: ST785603
- Unitary authority: Bath and North East Somerset
- Ceremonial county: Somerset
- Region: South West
- Country: England
- Sovereign state: United Kingdom
- Post town: Bath
- Postcode district: BA2
- Police: Avon and Somerset
- Fire: Avon
- Ambulance: South Western
- UK Parliament: Frome and East Somerset

The Friary is a small hamlet outside the English village of Freshford, about 6 miles (10 km) south of Bath, Somerset. Although closer to Freshford it lies within the parish of Hinton Charterhouse.

The hamlet consists of two small fields named Church Close and Corn Close, which are bounded to the south by Friary Wood and to the north by the River Frome. There are five detached houses which are accessed by a narrow lane about 0.5 miles (0.8 km) long, known locally as the causeway, which descends steeply through Friary Wood from the Warminster Road originally called the Black Dog Turnpike. The name Friary comes from its relationship to the Carthusian priory at Hinton Charterhouse about one mile away, and was where the lay brothers lived. A larger village south of Frome called Witham Friary also has connections to the Carthusians. On some early texts and Ordnance Survey maps it is shown as Friary Green. An early map of Somerset dated 1782 records the name as Friery Green. But today it is known locally as simply Friary or The Friary.

There are very little standing archaeological remains of the buildings used and lived in by the lay brothers but there is evidence of contemporary construction in one of the remaining cottages and the remains of a mill adjacent to the river Frome are still visible. The church of Church Close has disappeared and is thought to have been robbed of its stone to build the later mill at nearby Iford. However, examples of the stonemasons' art are regularly unearthered, including window tracery and mullions, and door surrounds which could only have come from a high status building such as a church. There is also evidence of fish ponds and buried walls belonging to other structures built during the lay brothers' occupation. The site has never been subject to detailed archaeological investigation.

The lay brothers abandoned the site some time before the dissolution of the monasteries and it later became part of the Hinton Abbey Farm estate. A map of Hinton Abbey Farm dated 1785 shows dwellings now long since demolished together with the names of their occupants or tenants. Two of the names appearing on this map are Swift and Humphrys. These families were related. Both Swift and Humphrys (now spelt Humphries) were living in Friary (in the same dwelling) according to the 1901 census and Humphries were living in the nearby village of Hinton Charterhouse until the late 1900s. One Mercy Swift, recorded on the 1901 census as 14 years old, was still living in Friary until the 1950s when the house she occupied was demolished as unfit. At that time it had neither electricity nor running water. Water had to be fetched from a nearby spring known as Ela's Well which itself has significant legendary connections with the founding of the monastery at nearby Hinton. Ela was Countess of Salisbury and in addition to founding the priory at Hinton she also founded the abbey at Lacock. Today many of the dwellings in Friary still derive water supplies from a local spring although it now arrives via a network of pipes. Mercy Swift's house or at least the ruins of it are still visible alongside the bridle path that links Friary to Freshford and in spring her hidden garden still produces an unexpected show of spring bulbs.
