= William Parry (priest) =

William Parry (bap. 2 May 1687 – 14 September 1756) was a Church of England priest and antiquarian.

== Life ==
Parry was baptised at St. John's Church, Hereford, England. He was educated at Jesus College, Oxford, matriculating on 19 February 1706 and obtaining degrees of BA in 1709, MA in 1712 and BD in 1719. He was a Fellow of Jesus College from 1714 to 1727. Parry was ordained deacon on 29 May 1712 and priest on 21 September 1712, both ordinations being carried out by the Bishop of Oxford, William Talbot, at Christ Church Cathedral, Oxford. On 27 September 1712, he was appointed rector of Tellisford, Somerset, resigning in 1715. From 1726 onwards, he was rector of Shipston-on-Stour, Warwickshire, and was buried there after his death on 14 September 1756.

He had elegant handwriting, admired by his contemporaries for its resemblance to well-executed typography. He transcribed some manuscripts located now in the Bodleian Library in Oxford, and wrote out a copy of the statutes of Jesus College, preserved in their archives. He frequently mentioned in correspondence to friends a project of his, namely creating an alphabetical catalogue of ancient and modern coins. His letters often included verses of poetry, and his verses were also published in The Gentleman's Magazine.
