= Mendips (disambiguation) =

The Mendips or Mendip Hills are a group of hills in Somerset, England.

Mendips may also refer to:

- 251 Menlove Avenue or Mendips, John Lennon's childhood home
- Mendips Raceway, a motorsport venue in the Mendip Hills in Somerset, England

== See also ==
- Mendip (disambiguation)
