= Westwood Manor =

Grade I listed manor house in Wiltshire, in the United Kingdom

Coordinates: 51.3299°N 2.2712°W

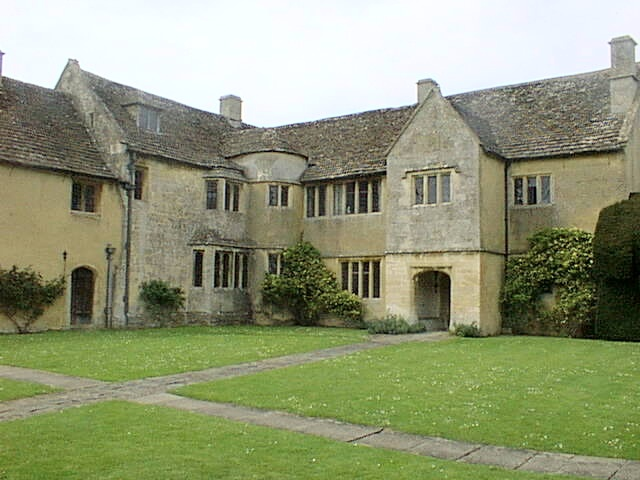
Westwood Manor

Westwood Manor is a 15th-century manor house with 16th-century additions and 17th-century plaster-work in the village of Westwood, near Bradford-on-Avon, Wiltshire, England. Pevsner describes Westwood Manor as "a perfect Wiltshire manor house". It has been in the ownership of the National Trust since 1956 and was designated as Grade I listed in 1962.

Early lessees include Thomas Horton (d. 1530), owner of a cloth mill at Iford, who is thought to have been responsible for improvements to the nearby village church.

The house was devised to the National Trust by Edgar Lister, a diplomat at the Ottoman court. The house contains fine furniture, musical instruments and tapestries collected by Lister from 1911 until his death in 1956. He restored the house throughout and adorned the garden with topiary; he was also an expert in needlepoint and upholstered much of its furniture in Florentine work.

The property is occupied by a tenant who administers it on behalf of the National Trust, and is open to the public a few days of the week in the summer.
