= Tellisford =

Village and civil parish in Somerset, England

Coordinates: 51.300°N 2.283°W

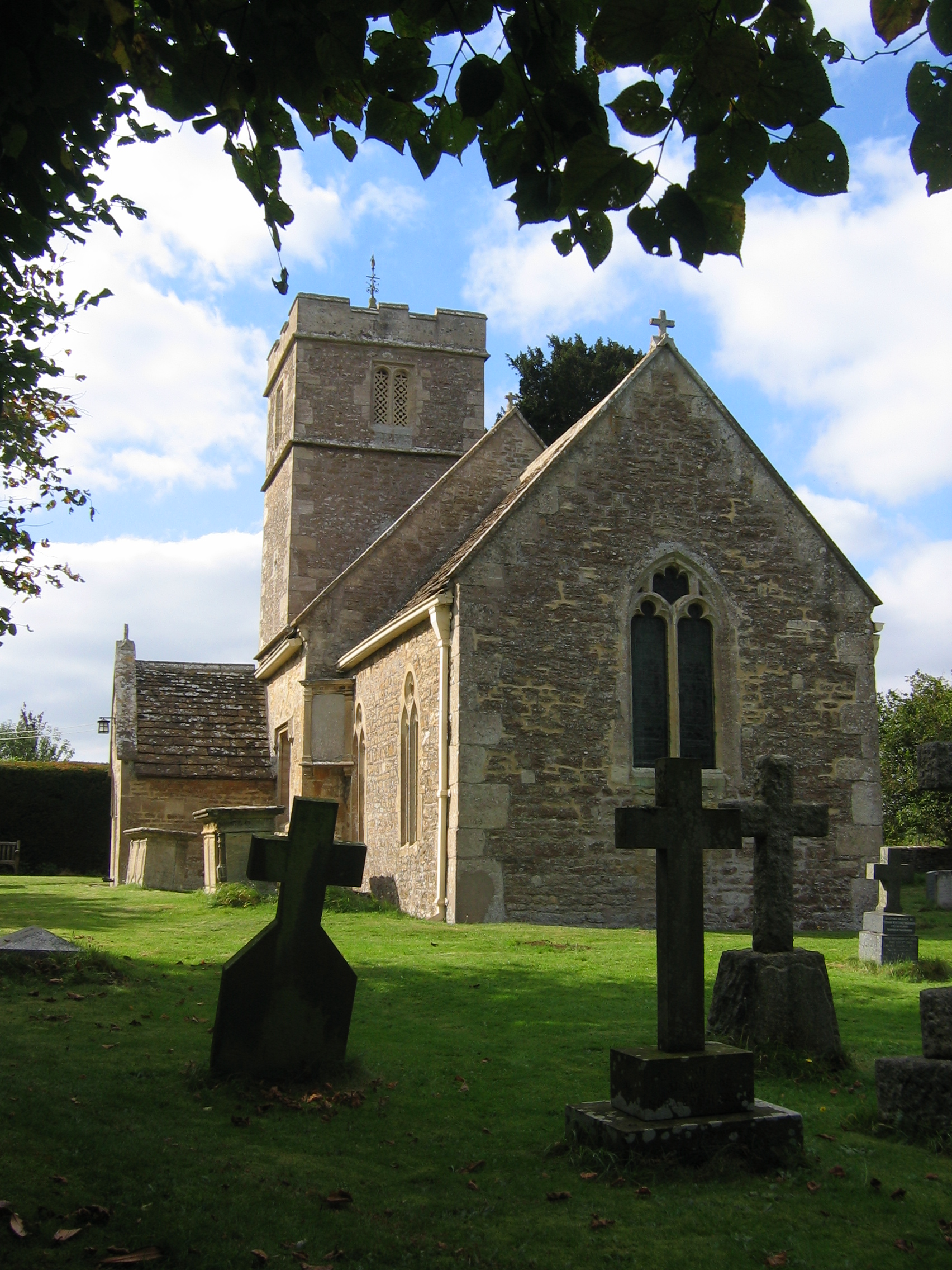
- All Saints church

- Location within Somerset
- Population: 182 (2011)
- OS grid reference: ST804557
- Unitary authority: Somerset Council
- Ceremonial county: Somerset
- Region: South West
- Country: England
- Sovereign state: United Kingdom
- Post town: BATH
- Postcode district: BA2
- Dialling code: 01373
- Police: Avon and Somerset
- Fire: Devon and Somerset
- Ambulance: South Western
- UK Parliament: Frome and East Somerset

Tellisford is a village and civil parish 6 miles (10 km) north-east of Frome in the county of Somerset, England. The parish includes the village of Woolverton.

== History ==
The village was known as Tefleford in 1001 and Tablesford in 1086 meaning Theabul's ford or ford at a flat place. The parish of Woolverton was part of the hundred of Frome, while Tellisford was part of the Wellow Hundred.

The manor was acquired by the Hungerfords of Farleigh Hungerford in the early 15th century who used the fulling mill to endow their chantry chapel. The cloth making industry continuing until 1912.

The village was partially destroyed by a serious fire in 1785.

Tellisford is one of the Thankful Villages which lost no men in World War I. It also lost no men in World War II. The village was featured on Darren Hayman's album, Thankful Villages Volume 2.

== Governance ==
Tellisford has a Parish Meeting, where all village electors are automatically members. It is required to meet at least twice a year and does not levy a precept.

For local government purposes, since 1 April 2023, the parish comes under the unitary authority of Somerset Council. Prior to this, it was part of the non-metropolitan district of Mendip (established under the Local Government Act 1972). It was part of Frome Rural District before 1974.

It is also part of the Frome and East Somerset county constituency represented in the House of Commons of the Parliament of the United Kingdom. It elects one Member of Parliament (MP) by the first past the post system of election.

== River Frome ==
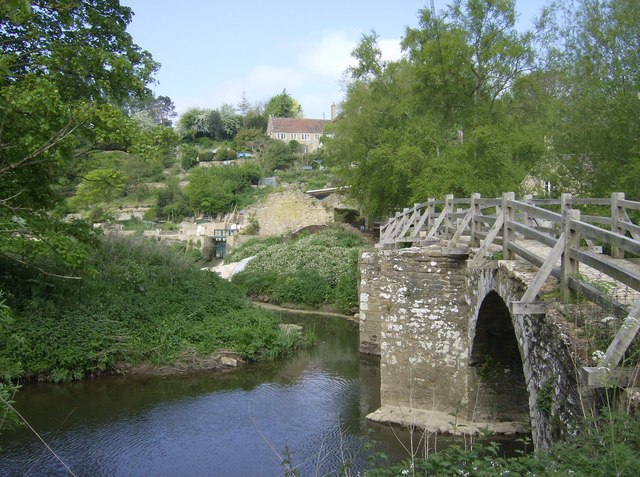
Bridge over the River Frome

The packhorse bridge over the Frome was extensively overhauled in 1692 by John Ducey of Tellisford and is a Grade II listed building. The cobbled roadway is 6 feet 10 inches (2.08 m) wide and the bridge has a total span of 66 feet (20 m) in three segmental arches.

There is a weir, and an Environment Agency monitoring station on the river 600 metres (2,000 ft) north of the village. Tellisford Mill is a water mill recently converted to hydroelectric generation.

== Religious sites ==
Tellisford's Church of All Saints dates from the 12th century and is Grade II listed. Its tower was added in 1490 and restoration was carried out in 1854. William Parry, an antiquarian, was the rector from 1712 until his resignation in 1715. Today the church is part of the Hardington Vale benefice, centred on Norton St Philip.

The former Church of St. Lawrence at Woolverton dates from the 14th century and is also Grade II listed. The church was declared redundant in 1995 and is now in private ownership.
