= Conkwell =

Hamlet in Wiltshire, England

Coordinates: 51.362°N 2.300°W

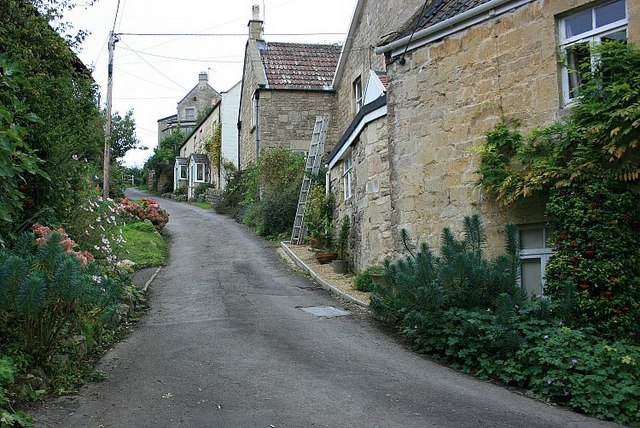

- Location within Wiltshire
- OS grid reference: ST792626
- Civil parish: Winsley
- Unitary authority: Wiltshire
- Ceremonial county: Wiltshire
- Region: South West
- Country: England
- Sovereign state: United Kingdom
- Post town: Bradford-on-Avon
- Postcode district: BA15
- Dialling code: 01225
- Police: Wiltshire
- Fire: Dorset and Wiltshire
- Ambulance: South Western
- UK Parliament: Melksham and Devizes

Conkwell is a hamlet in Winsley parish, Wiltshire, England, near the county border with North East Somerset. It is about 2.3 miles (3.7 km) west of Bradford-on-Avon and 3 miles (5 km) southeast of the city of Bath. The settlement was established to house the workers in the local stone quarries. The southern side is in Winsley, but the northern is in the Somerset parish of Bathford.

There used to be a small chapel serving the community, which has been incorporated into one of the dwellings. Conkwell Grange, to the south of the hamlet, is a country house built in 1907, designed in 17th-century style by E. G. Dawber for J. Thornton; the house is surrounded by an estate, created at the same time. Racehorses are trained at stables immediately east of the house.

At the end of the Dundas Aqueduct on the Kennet and Avon Canal, a wharf was constructed to serve the Conkwell stone quarries.
