= Mendip Power Group =

The Mendip Power Group is a group of owners installing micro-hydroelectric turbines in a number of historic former watermills in the Mendip area of Somerset, England. The group is one of several formed after the concept was developed by the South Somerset Hydropower Group.

The first to mill start electricity generation was Tellisford Mill on the River Frome, which began operating in April 2007 and produces 55 kW.

Other mills in the group, together with initial assessments of their capacity, include: Stowford Mill (37 kW) and Shawford Mill (31 kW), Jackdaws Iron Works (10 kW), Glencot House (5.8 kW), Burcott Mill (5.2 kW), Bleadney Mill (5.4 kW), Coleford Mill (6.6 kW), Old Mill (5.2 kW) and Farrants Mill (9.9 kW).

== See also ==
- Category:Community electricity generation in the United Kingdom
- Energy in the United Kingdom
- Energy policy of the United Kingdom
- Energy conservation
- Renewable energy
