= Tellisford Mill =

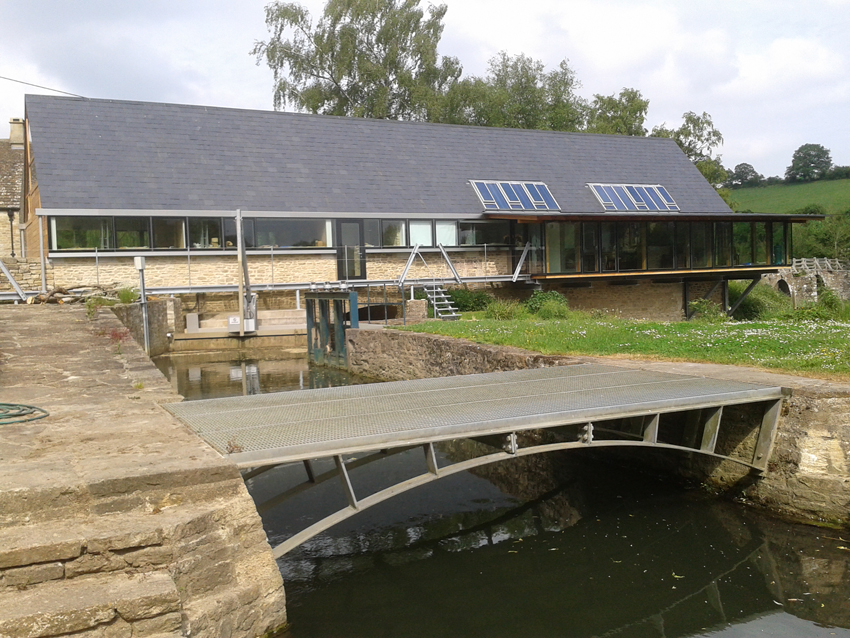
- Head race and building housing the micro hydro turbine, Tellisford Mill

- Location within Somerset

General information
- Location: Frome, Somerset, England
- Coordinates: 51.2999°N 2.2806°W
- Construction started: c. 11th century
- Completed: 2007 (restored)
- Cost: £135,000

Tellisford Mill is a 55 kilowatts (74 hp) installed capacity micro hydro run-of-the-river power station on the site of a former watermill in the village of Tellisford in the Mendip district of Somerset, England. The mill lies on the River Frome, 5 1/2 miles (9 km) north-east of the town of Frome.

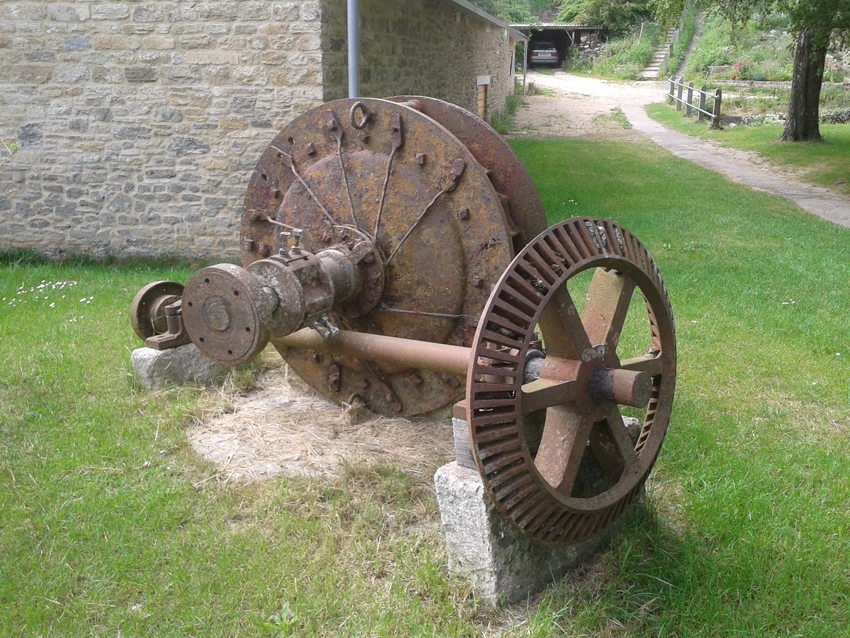
Old Francis turbine at Tellisford Mill

Part of the Mendip Power Group, the mill was restored to power in April 2007 using a German-made 55 kW vertically mounted Kaplan turbine, which is expected to produce on average 270 megawatt-hours (970 GJ) per year. The turbine replaced a 6 kW (8.0 hp) Francis turbine built in 1895.

Tellisford Mill is also home to a photographic studio.
