= Turleigh =

Hamlet in Wiltshire, England

Coordinates: 51.344°N 2.279°W

- Hamlet
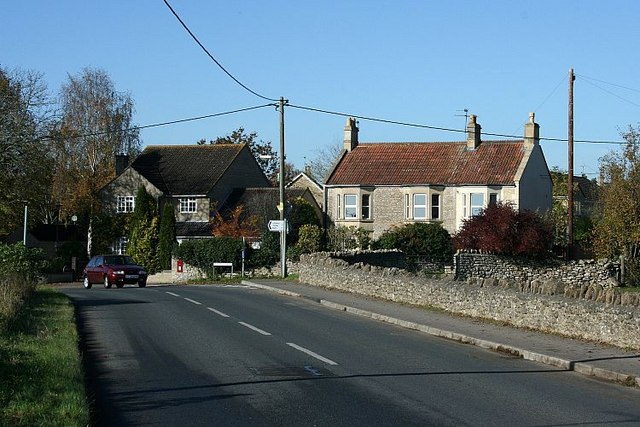
- The Old Main Road in Turleigh

- Location within Wiltshire
- OS grid reference: ST805607
- Civil parish: Winsley
- Unitary authority: Wiltshire
- Ceremonial county: Wiltshire
- Region: South West
- Country: England
- Sovereign state: United Kingdom
- Post town: BRADFORD-ON-AVON
- Postcode district: BA15
- Dialling code: 01225
- Police: Wiltshire
- Fire: Dorset and Wiltshire
- Ambulance: South Western
- UK Parliament: Melksham and Devizes

Turleigh is a hamlet in the civil parish of Winsley in Wiltshire, England. It lies on a hillside overlooking the Avon valley, about 0.5 miles (0.80 km) east of Winsley village and west of Bradford on Avon. The Kennet and Avon Canal and the railway between Bath and Bradford on Avon run through the valley below.

In the Middle Ages, Turleigh formed part of the manor of Bradford, held by Shaftesbury Abbey. Farming was the main occupation until the 18th century. The hamlet had a tannery, which closed in the early 1880s, as well as brewing and malting. Turleigh is a conservation area containing 21 listed buildings, including the Grade II* Turleigh Manor. Its springs feed the Turleigh Trows, a series of stone troughs formerly used for the water supply.

== History ==
=== Toponymy ===
The name is first recorded in 1341 as Turlinge, followed by Torlyng (1362), Turlin (1699) and Turlyn (1748). It probably derives from the Old English þyrelung, meaning 'piercing through', in reference to the deep valley. Later forms included Turley and Turly. The present spelling dates from the late 19th century, perhaps to match other -leigh names in the district.

=== Early history ===
Turleigh lies in the civil parish of Winsley, which until 1894 was a tithing of the ancient parish of Bradford. In the Middle Ages, the area formed part of the manor of Bradford, held by Shaftesbury Abbey from 1001 until the abbey was dissolved in 1539. The abbey also held the rectory of Bradford, whose glebe made up much of the land.

After several grants and leases, the manor of Bradford passed to Sir Francis Walsingham, who in 1584 gave it to his daughter Frances. From the mid-1580s John Kent, a lawyer from Devizes, managed her estates at Bradford and Winsley, and in about 1612 bought Winsley; on his death in 1630 it passed to his son Thomas. The estate, known as the reputed manor of Winsley-cum-Turleigh, (Note: A "reputed manor" was an estate that functioned as a manor in reputation and name only, usually after losing its formal medieval courts. Outside of the courtroom, it still operated as a standard landlord-owned estate.) had the demesne land of Turleigh Farm as its main holding in the hamlet. In 1700, when it was held by a later Thomas Kent, it comprised five houses and about 900 acres across Winsley, Turleigh, Haugh and Bradford. On his death in 1703 it was divided among his relatives, and in 1731 the Bradford clothier John Thresher transferred it to William and Richard Long.

Until the 18th century most people in Turleigh worked on the land. The 18th century brought prosperity, and many houses were built, among them Stoneleigh. Many of the smaller houses were occupied by quarrymen, stonemasons and tanners. Until the end of the 19th century, the owners of Turleigh Manor and Turleigh House held more than half the land around the village.

=== Industry and 20th century ===
From the early 17th century, around 50 people worked at the long-established tannery and its 16th-century mill, which ground tree bark to extract the chemicals needed for tanning. The Druce family ran it at that time, and the Byfields from 1820. Property sales records from 1857 stated that the mill had been used as a tan-yard for over a century. Brewing and malting were also carried on from the 18th century. The mill and tannery closed in the early 1880s.

In 1903, a large estate that included the present Turleigh House, the tannery buildings and The Lyns was sold at auction. In 1920, Major Scarth gave the Turleigh Club to the village in trust, providing a club, reading room and garden. It remained in use until 1979. Mains water arrived in the 1930s, followed by gas. Early in the Second World War, piped sewerage replaced privies and septic tanks. The Prince of Wales public house, at No. 265 Turleigh Down, closed in 1952, followed by the bakery in 1957, the village shop and off-licence in 1968 and the post office in 1970, leaving Turleigh wholly residential.

== Landmarks ==
The whole hamlet lies within the Turleigh Conservation Area, designated in 1973, which contains 21 listed buildings. Turleigh Manor is Grade II* listed and the others are Grade II. (Note: Grade II*: particularly important buildings of more than special interest; Grade II: buildings that are of special interest, warranting every effort to preserve them.)

The former Baptist chapel above the coach house of Turleigh Manor

Turleigh Manor, formerly known as Turleigh House, (Note: The house was never a manor house; an owner gave it its present name in the 20th century.) stands on a site occupied by a house since at least 1548. John Curll, a clothier from Freshford, built the present house in the late 17th or early 18th century on land that had belonged to the medieval parsonage of Bradford. The parsonage lands belonged to the Dean and Chapter of Bristol Cathedral from 1542 to 1861. The house was one of their three copyhold tenancies, held by the clothier Dicke family from 1615 to 1670 and then by Curll until 1707. From 1775 the tenant was Richard Atwood, a clothier and close friend of Edmund Burke, who visited him at the house; Atwood died in 1808.

Atwood's widow, Ann, who died in 1842, had a chapel built above the coach house. It was licensed as a dissenters' meeting house in 1819, described as a Baptist chapel by 1827 and closed in 1885. The chapel and Turleigh Manor's early 18th-century stable block are listed together at Grade II.

The Lyns, thought to be the oldest house in Turleigh

The Lyns, on the corner of Green Lane, is thought to be the oldest house in Turleigh. It probably began as a 15th-century hall house with a cross wing. (Note: Historic England dates the house to the 16th century.) The house was home to the Druce family. In the 1620s, William Druce, recorded as Turleigh's first tanner, married Elinor Dicke, whose family of clothiers held the present Turleigh Manor. The house passed to Richard Druce in the mid-17th century. By 1820 it belonged to Atwood's widow, Ann, who lived directly across the street in Turleigh Manor (then known as Turleigh House). In 1822, she held the parsonage manor, the rectory's estate in Winsley, which comprised church-owned farmlands (glebe) and tenant properties, and still owned The Lyns in 1841. Another early house, Turleigh Farmhouse, dates from the 16th or 17th century. Its thatched roof and much of its upper floor were later destroyed by fire. (Note: Heap gives the date of the fire as 1952, while the Historic England listing describes the house as "much renewed after a fire c1970".)

Several buildings of the former tannery survive. The mill, of 16th-century origin, has a large iron waterwheel and a mill pond behind it. In the 18th and 19th centuries, the mill was attached to a nearby house, known as Brooklands, later called Turleigh Mill. The house was renamed Turleigh House in 1976, and the name Turleigh Mill was given to the mill building, which was converted into a residence. The Old Tannery, built in the late 18th or early 19th century into the hillside, was formerly listed as a drying house. It became a private house in 1957.

== Geography ==
Turleigh lies on the hillside between Winsley village and the floor of the Avon valley, about 0.5 miles (0.80 km) east of Winsley, from which it is separated by a steep, wooded slope; Bradford on Avon lies further east. In the valley below, the Kennet and Avon Canal runs a little to the north and east of the river, while the railway between Bradford on Avon and Bath follows the valley, crossing both the river and canal in the south of Winsley parish.

The hamlet stands on Jurassic Great Oolite limestone, which is used to produce Bath stone. The road from Winsley descends through a gorge cut into the rock, past a former quarry. Springs rise where the limestone meets a bed of clay. The strongest spring supplies the Turleigh Trows, a series of seven roughly sculpted stone troughs fed by a conduit from higher up the hill. The water then flows under the road into the mill pond. The water remains at a constant 52 °F (11 °C) throughout the year. Before the water was piped to public taps and houses, the spring supplied drinking water for residents and livestock. At the 2011 census, the civil parish of Winsley had a population of 1,920; no separate figure is published for Turleigh.

== Notable people ==
- Sir Richard Atwood Glass (1820–1873), whose company made half of the first transatlantic telegraph cable, was born in Turleigh.
