= Freshford railway station =

Railway station in Somerset, England

Freshford
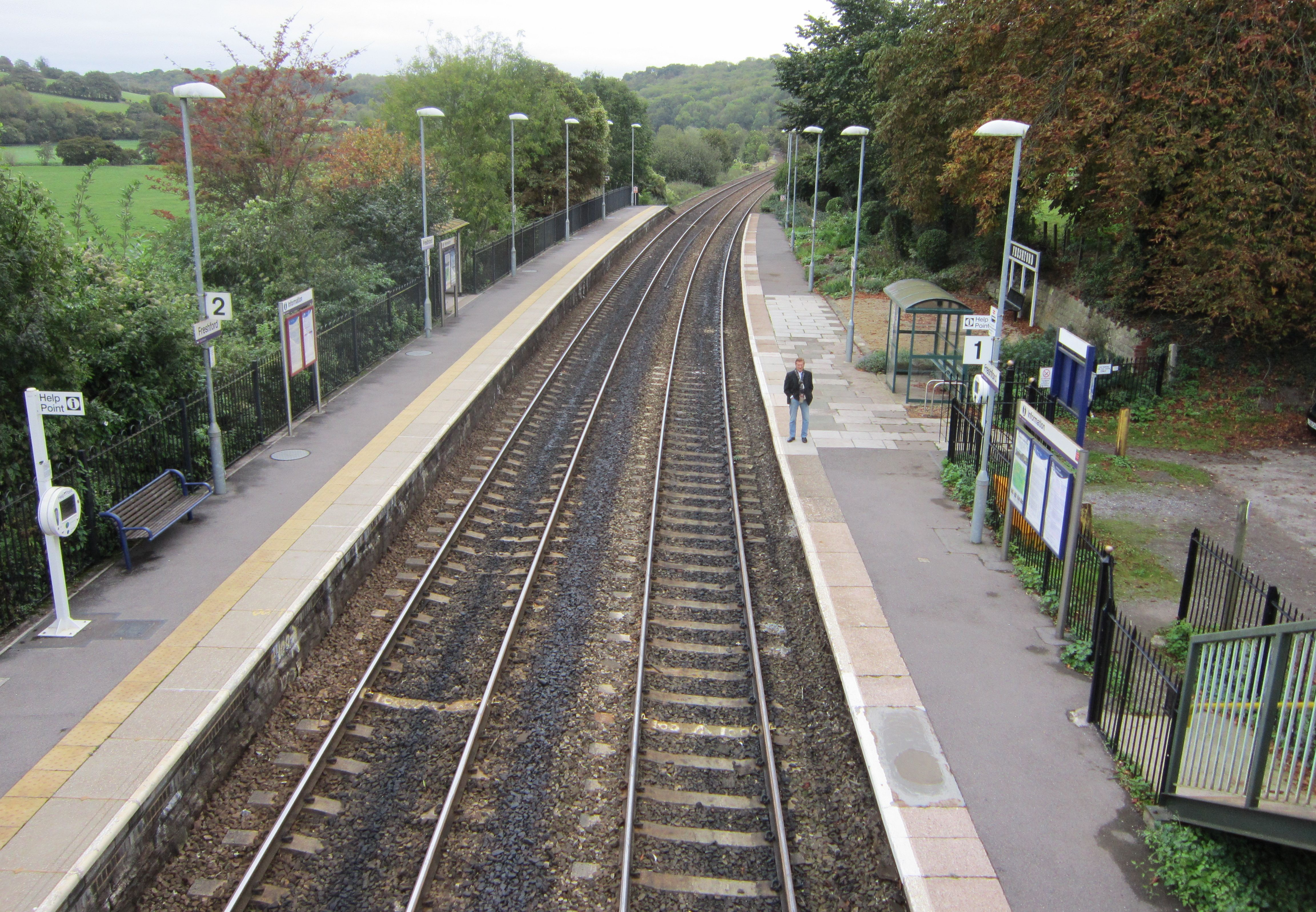

General information
- Location: Freshford, Bath and North East Somerset; England
- Coordinates: 51.3420°N 2.3010°W
- Grid reference: ST791603
- Manager: Great Western Railway
- Platforms: 2

Other information
- Station code: FFD
- Classification: DfT category F2

History
- Original company: Great Western Railway

Key dates
- 1857: Opened

Passengers
- 2021/22: ▲34,112
- 2022/23: ▲44,094
- 2023/24: ▲48,416
- 2024/25: ▲55,412
- 2025/26: ▲56,784
Location
Notes
- Passenger statistics from the Office of Rail and Road

Freshford railway station is a railway station serving the village of Freshford, Bath and North East Somerset, England. It also serves the nearby village of Limpley Stoke in Wiltshire. The station has two platforms and is served by Great Western Railway.

For many years the station had a notable flower garden maintained by the Vaisey sisters. This later faded but in 2007 local residents renovated the garden and planted new flowers in the memory of the Vaisey sisters. A few weeks later staff from Network Rail cut down all the flowers.

In February 2006, Platform 2 at Freshford was raised by 30 cm to reduce the large stepping gap between the train and the platform. It had been lowered in 1988 as part of the realignment of the track through the station to allow trains to pass at a faster speed. At the same time the platform was raised, the station also received additional improvements including better lighting and the construction of a new waiting shelter.

In February 2022 the preserved sign on platform 2 was notably deteriorating and in dire need of repair. Great Western Railway temporarily removed the sign and replaced it with a well built sign that preserved its original design.

== Accidents and incidents ==
- On 12 November 2008, a passenger train collided with a van on a level crossing at Freshford. There were no injuries.

== Services ==
A half-hourly peak and hourly off-peak service is currently provided northbound to Bath Spa and Bristol and southbound to Bradford-on-Avon, Trowbridge, Westbury and then further to Weymouth and Southampton Central.

Preceding station	National Rail	Following station
Bath Spa	Great Western Railway; Bristol-Southampton; Bristol-Weymouth	Avoncliff
	Historical railways	
Limpley Stoke; Line open, station closed	Great Western Railway; Wessex Main Line	Avoncliff; Line and station open

== See also ==
- Wilts, Somerset and Weymouth Railway
