= Avoncliff =

Village in Wiltshire, England

Coordinates: 51.3383°N 2.2822°W

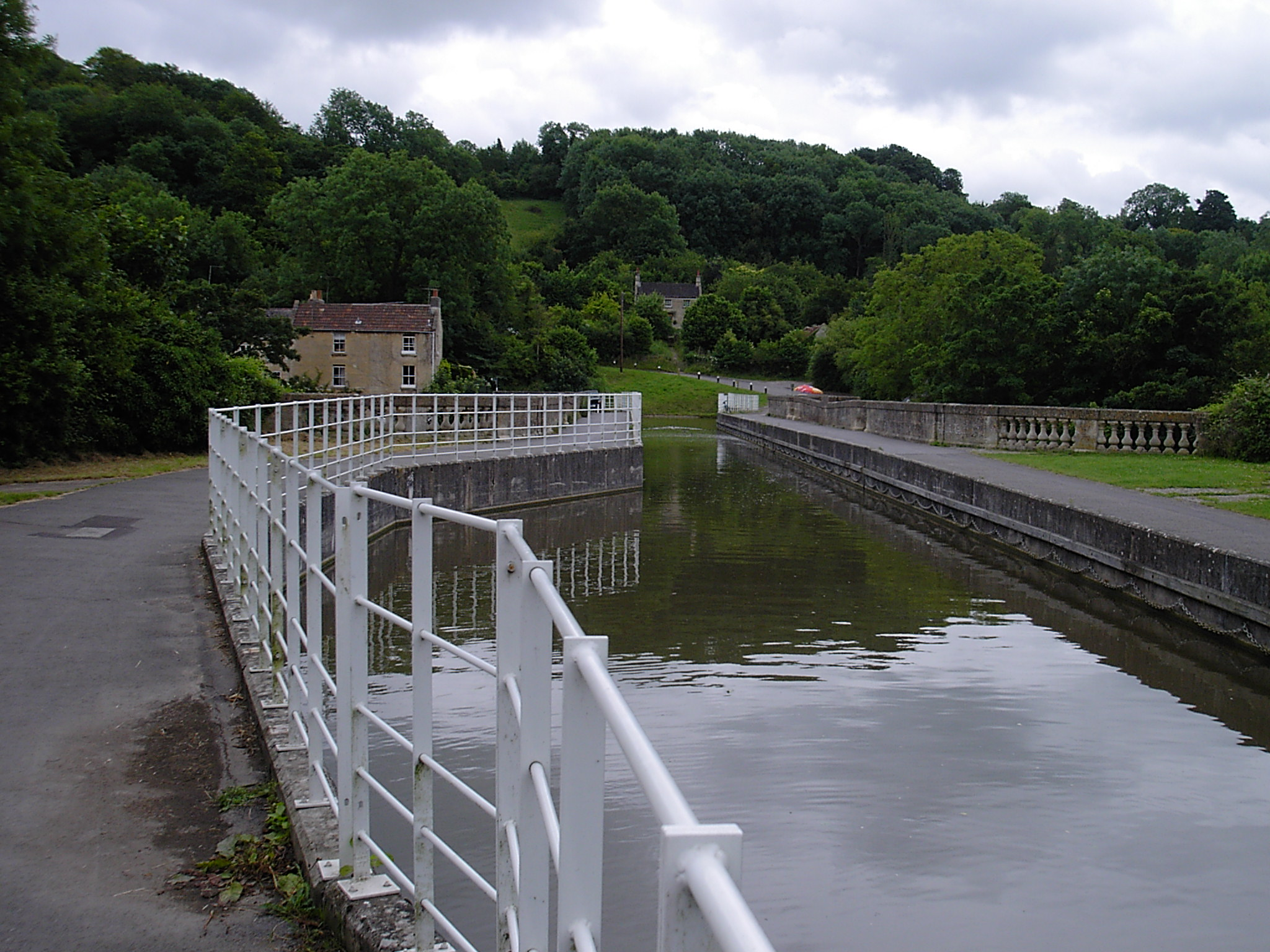
- Canal aqueduct

- Location within Wiltshire
- OS grid reference: ST804600
- Civil parish: Westwood
- Unitary authority: Wiltshire
- Ceremonial county: Wiltshire
- Region: South West
- Country: England
- Sovereign state: United Kingdom
- Post town: BRADFORD-ON-AVON
- Postcode district: BA15
- Dialling code: 01225
- UK Parliament: Chippenham

Avoncliff is a small village in west Wiltshire, England, in the north of Westwood parish about 1.5 miles (2.4 km) southwest of Bradford-on-Avon.

It is the point at which the Kennet and Avon canal crosses the river and railway line via the Avoncliff Aqueduct, which was built by John Rennie and chief engineer John Thomas, between 1797 and 1801. The aqueduct consists of three arches and is 110 yards long with a central elliptical arch of 60 ft (18.3 m) span with two side arches each semicircular and 34 ft (10.4 m) across, all with V-jointed arch stones. The spandrel and wing walls are built in alternate courses of ashlar masonry, and rock-faced blocks. The central span sagged soon after it was built and has been repaired many times.

There is a picturesque weir on the River Avon where permission for a micro hydro electric scheme was applied for from the Environment Agency in 2009, but this is still awaited in 2013. This is a popular starting point for walks along both the canal and the river, and also to Barton Farm Country Park at Bradford-on-Avon. Avoncliff is covered by two Parish Councils; Winsley on the north side of the river and Westwood on the south side.

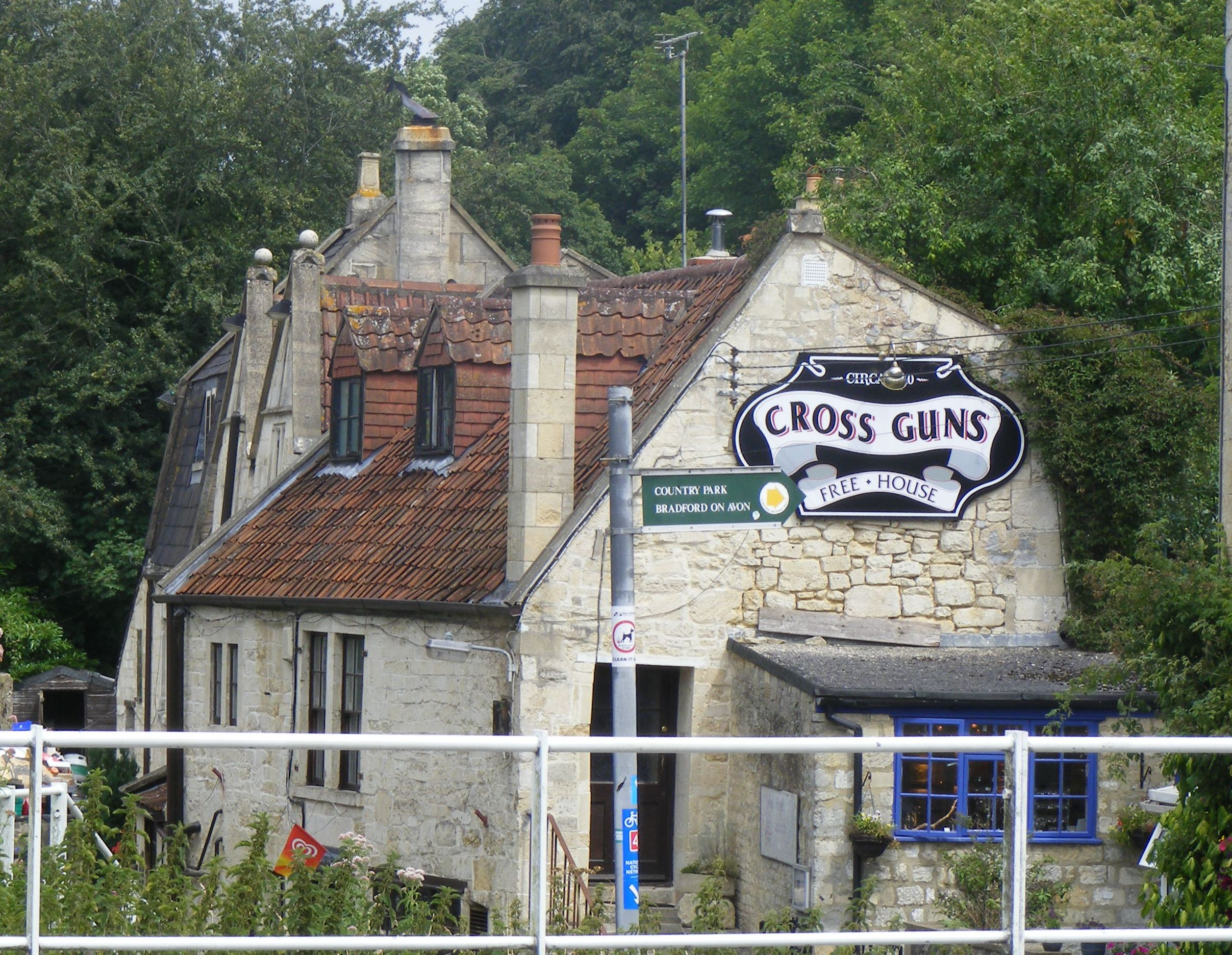
The Cross Guns

The Cross Guns Inn was built in the late 17th century and is a Grade II listed building.

== Railway ==
Avoncliff has a tiny railway station, with a one-carriage-length platform in each direction, which used to be called Avoncliff Halt since it was a request stop, requiring people on the platform to wave down the trains. It has become, as of 2011, a regular stop. Services are hourly, run by Great Western Railway, and generally continue on to Westbury and Weymouth in a southerly direction, or Bristol Temple Meads and Gloucester in a northerly direction.
