= Bradford-on-Avon railway station =

Railway station in Wiltshire, England

Bradford-on-Avon
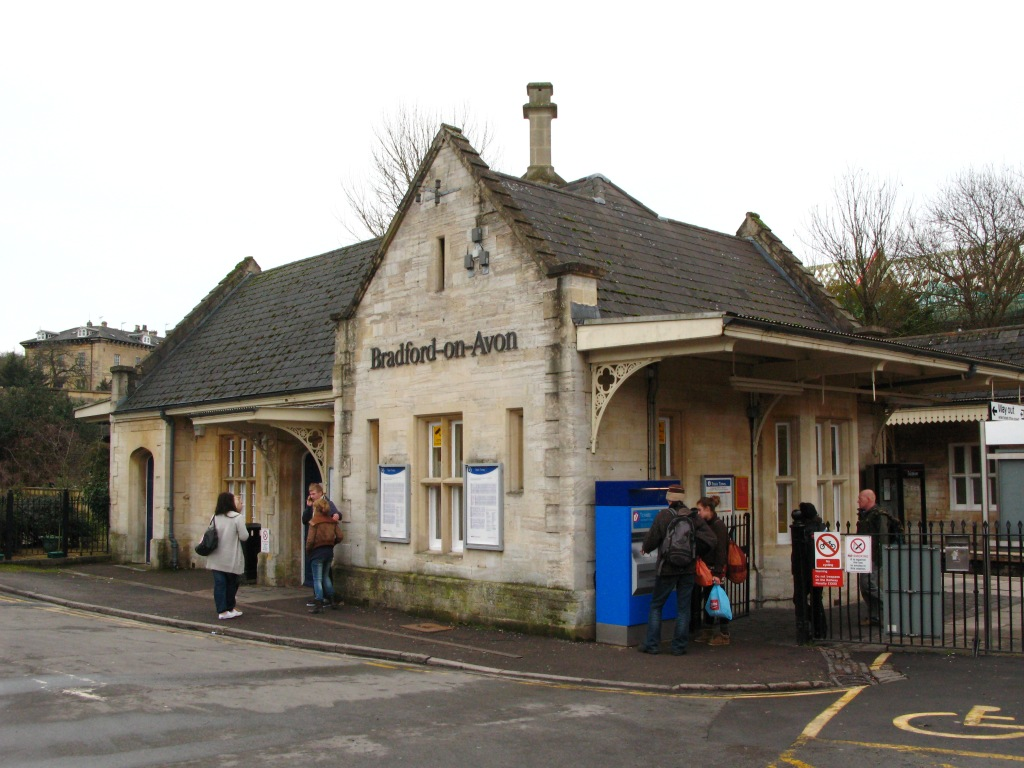

General information
- Location: Bradford on Avon, Wiltshire; England
- Coordinates: 51.3448°N 2.2527°W
- Grid reference: ST825606
- Manager: Great Western Railway
- Platforms: 2

Other information
- Station code: BOA
- Classification: DfT category E

History
- Original company: Great Western Railway

Key dates
- 1857: Opened

Passengers
- 2020/21: ▼0.118 million
- Interchange: ▼1,152
- 2021/22: ▲0.352 million
- Interchange: ▲3,594
- 2022/23: ▲0.427 million
- Interchange: ▲6,234
- 2023/24: ▲0.487 million
- Interchange: ▼4,805
- 2024/25: ▲0.532 million
- Interchange: ▲5,217
Location
Notes
- Passenger statistics from the Office of Rail and Road

Bradford-on-Avon railway station is a railway station on the Wessex Main Line in between Avoncliff and Trowbridge, serving the town of Bradford on Avon (the station name is hyphenated, unlike the name of the town), in Wiltshire, England. The station is 9 miles 35 chains (15.2 km) south east of Bath Spa. The station was originally conceived by the Wilts, Somerset and Weymouth Railway, but was not built until after the company was purchased by the Great Western Railway in 1850 and did not open until 1857.

== History ==
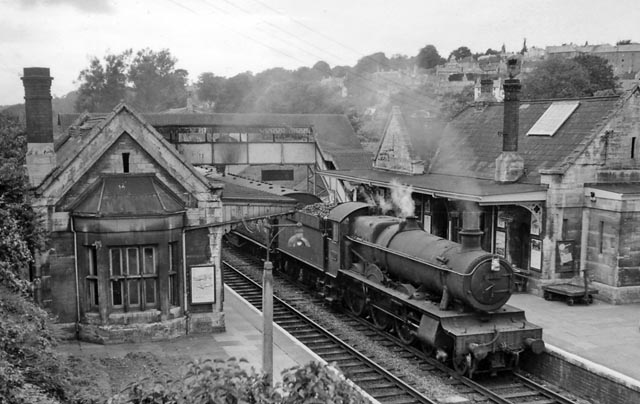
Bradford-on-Avon station in 1963

The new station buildings were completed by 1850, and also included a goods shed, although the railway tracks were not added until later. The main station was built to the most elaborate of the standard designs used by Brunel, resembling a lodge or estate house of the period, but used local Bath stone, rather than the more commonly used bricks and mortar.

=== Initial plans ===
A branch line serving Bradford on Avon was initially planned as part of the Wilts, Somerset and Weymouth Railway (WS&WR), a broad gauge railway, supported by the Great Western Railway (GWR), also a broad gauge railway, in preference to the plans of the London and South Western Railway (LSWR), a standard gauge railway, which wanted to expand its territory westwards. The proposed line was to run between Weymouth and Bristol.

The WS&WR was authorised by Act of Parliament in June 1845, and Isambard Kingdom Brunel, already the engineer of the GWR, was appointed engineer of the new railway. The development of the WS&WR was part of the Gauge Wars.

=== Operation ===
Financial difficulties slowed the progress of the WS&WR and only twelve miles of the line had been completed when construction was halted. The GWR took control of the WS&WR in a bid to complete the line, but soon wanted to abandon plans to build the branch lines, including the Bradford on Avon branch, to reduce costs. This aroused local opposition from local investors and a lawsuit in 1852 compelled the GWR to complete the Bradford branch. The station finally opened on 2 February 1857, with a service of five trains each day each way.

=== Technical developments ===
With the development of signalling systems by the GWR, a signal box, with a 30-lever frame, was built to the west of the station and goods shed in 1877. At the same time another signal box, controlling the Greenland Mills level crossing to the east of the station.

Although the station was conceived in the gauge wars of the 1840s, the line was finally converted to standard gauge between 18 and 22 June 1874.

=== Decline in traffic ===
The goods yard was closed to traffic in 1964, but was used for coal deliveries for another year. In 1966 the signal box was closed and demolished.

== Services ==
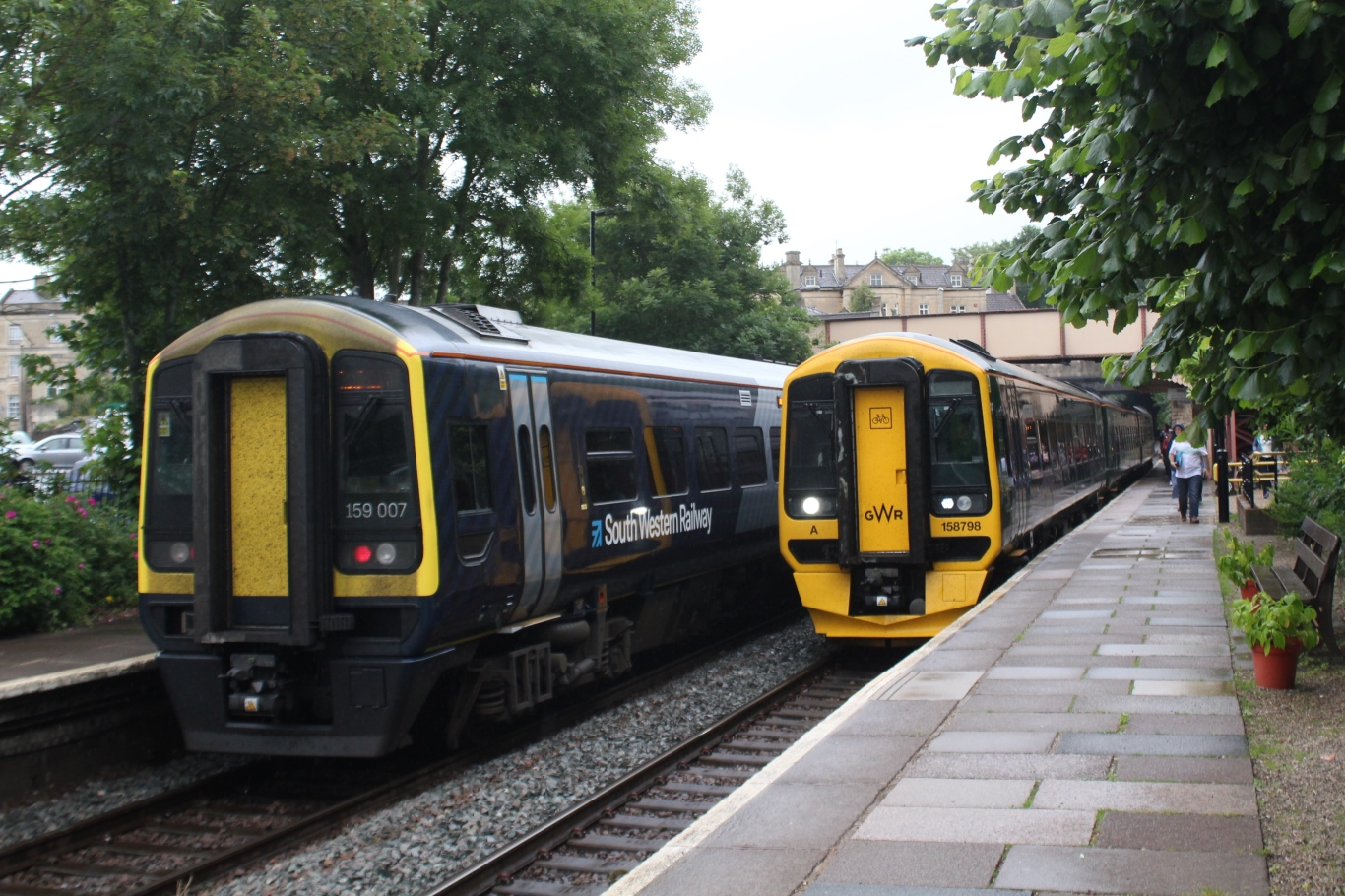
South Western Railway and Great Western Railway services at Bradford-on-Avon

Regular service (half-hourly each way on Mondays to Saturdays, and hourly on Sundays) is provided by Great Western Railway to Bath Spa, Bristol Temple Meads and either Gloucester or Cardiff Central northbound and Weymouth or Southampton Central and Portsmouth Harbour in the south.

There is also an early morning direct service to London Paddington from Bristol Temple Meads, departing Bradford-on-Avon at 5:35 am, operated by either a Class 800 or Class 802 Intercity Express Train. There is no return service.

| Preceding station | National Rail | Following station |
|---|---|---|
| Avoncliff | Great Western Railway; Heart of Wessex Line | Trowbridge |
| Bath Spa | Great Western Railway; Wessex Main Line | Trowbridge |
