= Freshford, Somerset =

Village in Somerset, England

Coordinates: 51.339°N 2.305°W

Freshford
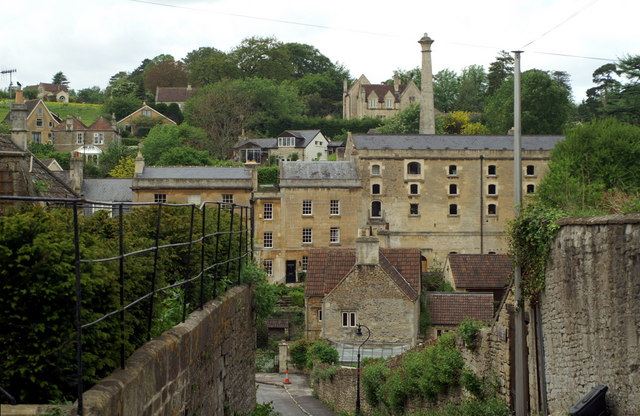
- The brewery chimney at Freshford Mill

- Location within Somerset
- Population: 551
- OS grid reference: ST785603
- Unitary authority: Bath and North East Somerset
- Ceremonial county: Somerset
- Region: South West
- Country: England
- Sovereign state: United Kingdom
- Post town: BATH
- Postcode district: BA2
- Police: Avon and Somerset
- Fire: Avon
- Ambulance: South Western
- UK Parliament: Frome and East Somerset

Freshford is a village and civil parish in the Avon valley 6 miles (10 km) south-east of Bath, in the county of Somerset, England. The parish has a population of 551. It is in the Cotswolds Area of Outstanding Natural Beauty (AONB), within the Green Belt and is in a conservation area.

The village of Freshford includes the smaller hamlets of Friary, Sharpstone, Park Corner, Woodside and Staples Hill, which are separated from the village centre by a few hundred metres of open fields.

The village history goes back to Saxon times and it expanded with the growth of local industry but is now largely residential.

== History ==
The village has existed since Saxon times, and existed before the land at Fersceforde was given to Bath Abbey after the Norman Conquest. A mill existed here as early as 1086 and there are still remains of one built in the 1540s.

Freshford was part of the hundred of Bath Forum.

Freshford Bridge over the River Frome dates from the early to mid 16th century.

In the 19th century freestone and fuller's earth were mined in the parish and employment included the manufacture of cloth, operation of malt-kilns, breweries, and fulling-mills. The importance of weaving can be seen at the now derelict site of Freshford Mill, and the numerous weavers' cottages in the village. Dunkirk Mill, which was built in 1795 for Thomas Joyce, is now a residential property located just over the parish boundary in Hinton Charterhouse.

The war memorial in the village commemorates the 17 men from the village who died in World War I and four from World War II.

=== Titfield Thunderbolt ===
The village is notable in that the houses have names instead of numbers, as was noted in the Ealing comedy The Titfield Thunderbolt, which was filmed locally in 1952 and where Freshford village served as the set for the idyllic English village under threat. The railway scenes were filmed on the Camerton branch line of the Bristol and North Somerset Railway. Passenger services started in 1910 and were suspended for the First World War in 1915; they resumed in 1923 but were withdrawn entirely in 1925. Freight services, mostly of coal, on the branch line ceased in 1951. The line achieved some fame after closure by its use in the 1952 film, but the track was taken up in 1958. The cricket scene was filmed near the former Viaduct Hotel at Limpley Stoke. Cricket is still played on this pitch, part of which is used by the local school.

== Governance ==
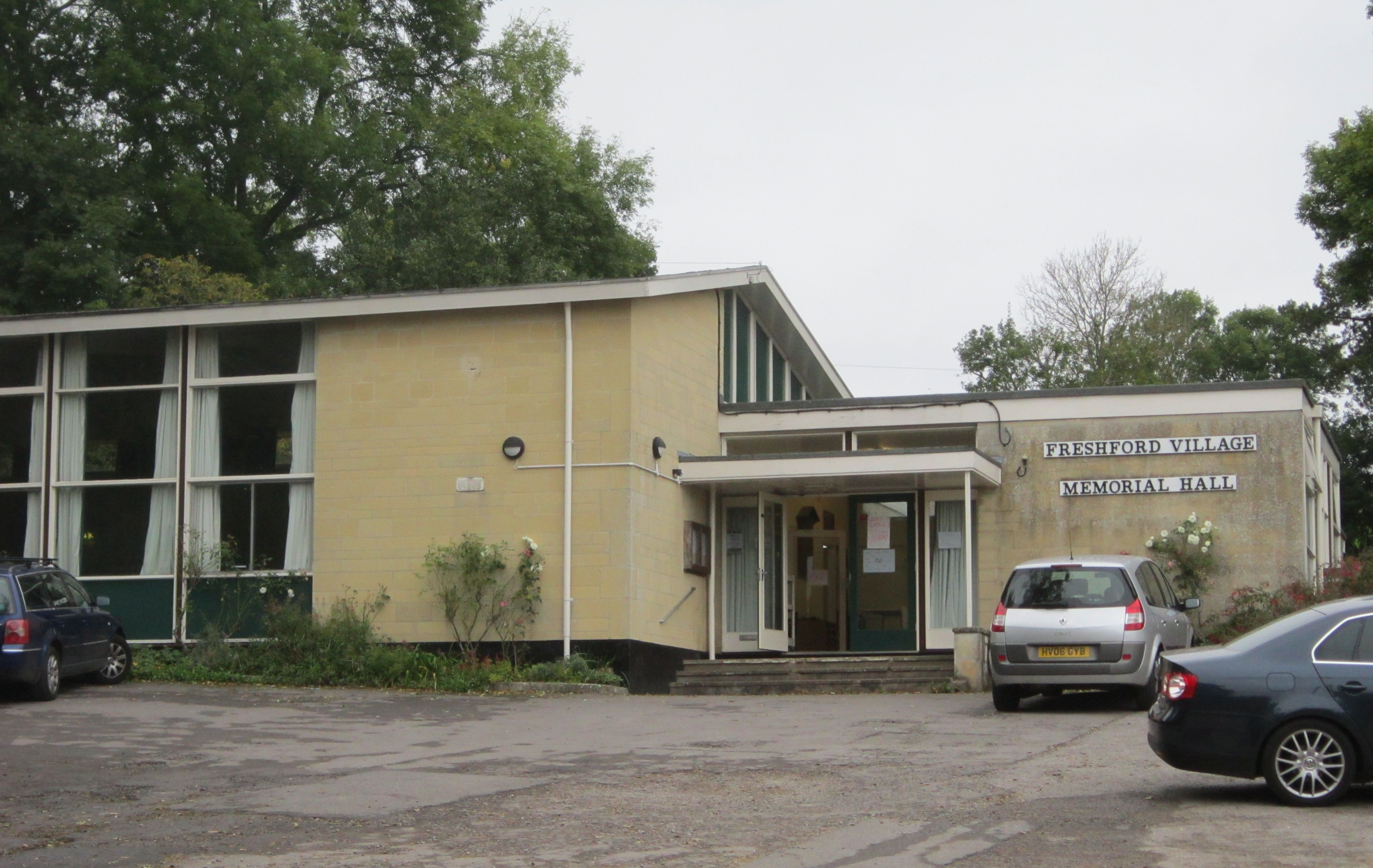
Freshford village hall

Freshford shares its parish council with Sharpstone and the surrounding hamlets. The parish council has responsibility for local issues, including setting an annual precept (local rate) to cover the council's operating costs and producing annual accounts for public scrutiny. The parish council evaluates local planning applications and works with the local police, district council officers, and neighbourhood watch groups on matters of crime, security, and traffic. The parish council's role also includes initiating projects for the maintenance and repair of parish facilities, such as the village hall or community centre, playing fields and playgrounds, as well as consulting with the district council on the maintenance, repair, and improvement of highways, drainage, footpaths, public transport, and street cleaning. Conservation matters (including trees and listed buildings) and environmental issues are also of interest to the council.

The village is part of the ward of Bathavon South in the unitary authority of Bath and North East Somerset. The ward is currently represented by Councillor Neil Butters, a member of the Liberal Democrats. Bath and North East Somerset was created in 1996, as established by the Local Government Act 1992. Its area covers part of the ceremonial county of Somerset but it is administered independently of the non-metropolitan county. The authority's administrative headquarters are in Bath. Between 1 April 1974 and 1 April 1996, it was the Wansdyke district and the City of Bath of the county of Avon, with Freshford lying in Wansdyke. Before 1974 the parish was part of the Bathavon Rural District.

It is also part of the Frome and East Somerset parliamentary constituency, and was part of the South West England constituency of the European Parliament prior to Britain leaving the European Union in January 2020.

== Geography ==
The village is in the valley of the River Avon close to the point at which it is joined by the River Frome. The Kennet and Avon Canal is visible across the Avon valley from the village, but the nearest crossings of the Avon are at Avoncliff and Limpley Stoke.

Freshford's village centre is a conservation area which was created in 1975 and extended in April 2007, designated under the provisions of Section 69 of the Planning (Listed Buildings and Conservation Areas) Act 1990.

== Economy ==
A significant number (20%) of local residents work from home using the internet. The village has a long-standing tradition of attracting "retired people of status". It is also a dormitory town for people working in Bath and Bristol (27%).

== Landmarks ==
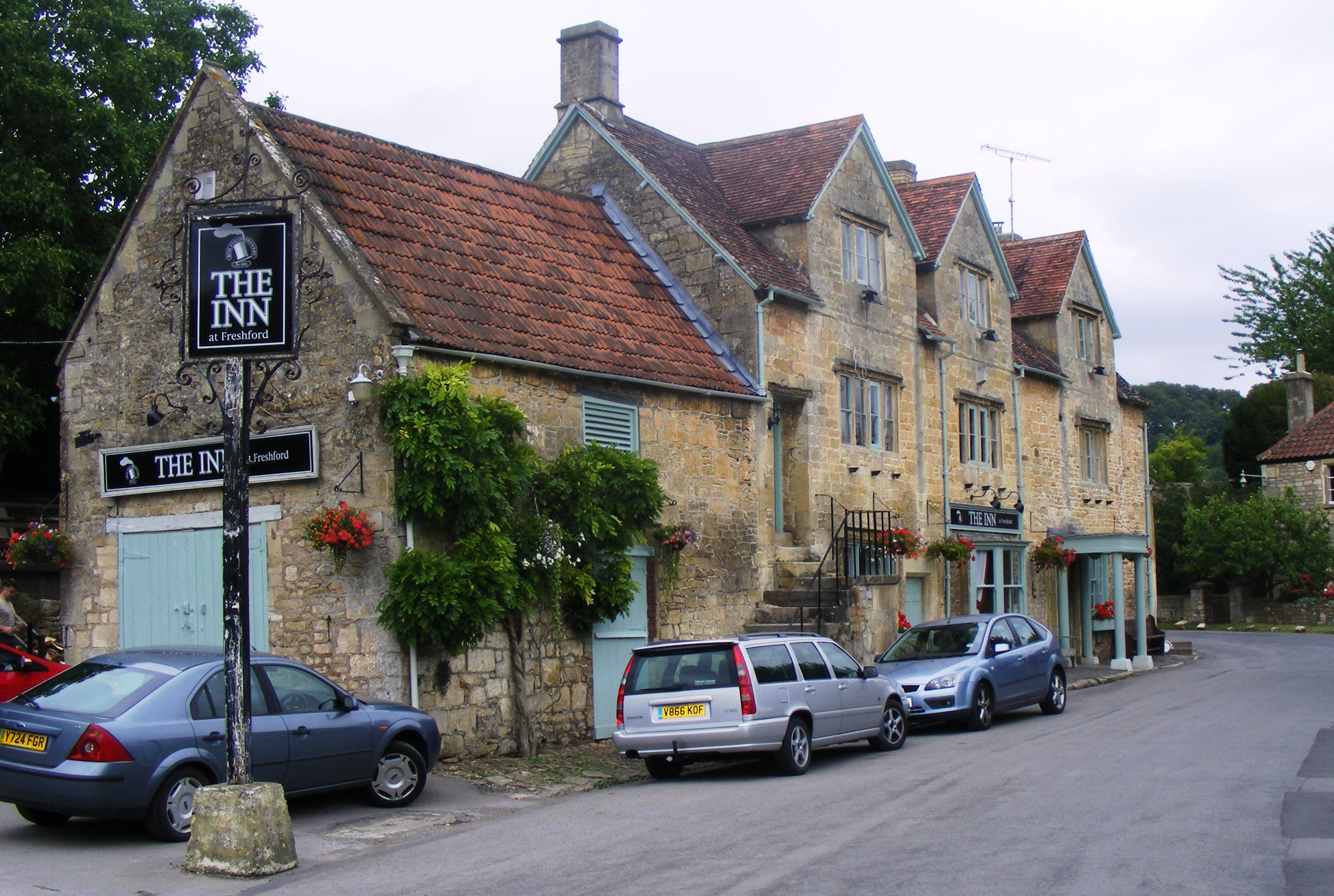
The Inn

Most of the buildings and boundary walls are built from the local oolitic limestone.

The 19th-century brewery and attached cottages are now a private residence. The tall ashlar chimney has a tapered octagonal shaft with moulded cap and provides an obvious landmark around the village.

Freshford Manor is an 18th-century manor house. It was built on the site of an earlier house known as Pittes Place which dated from before 1603.

The local pub is called The Inn, and sits beside the River Frome, a tributary of the River Avon. The Inn has never been an inn.

=== Freshford Mill ===
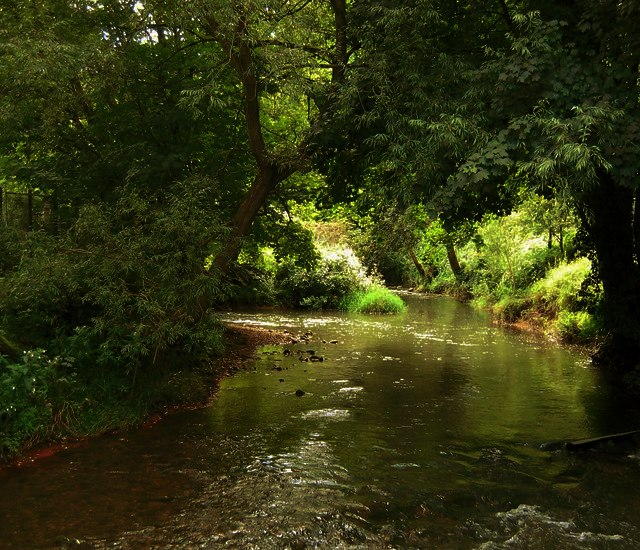
River Frome at Freshford Mill

The Freshford Mill site comprises a mixture of buildings the oldest of which, the mill owner's house, dates back to the 17th century. There are also three major blocks from the late 18th/early 19th centuries, all in natural stone and clay tile or slate, and three more modern buildings from the 1950s and 1980s. The site features a mill channel with an internal wheel although a narrower mill leat was blocked many years ago. The site was used until 1993 by Peradins for the manufacture of rubber components for the car industry. Since the firm relocated to their new premises in Trowbridge the site has been essentially empty. In 2003 an application was made to turn the site into a rural recreation area, nature sanctuary and workshops. The site was sold to new owners and more recent proposals are for a residential estate. This has been opposed by local residents and the parish council. They have argued that the increase in the population of the village and the effect on the infrastructure such as the roads and school would be too great. There are also concerns because the site is within a Zone 3 floodplain, which is designated by the Environment Agency as having an annual probability of river flooding of 1% or greater. The site contains several protected species of bat.

== Transport ==
Freshford is close to the A36.

It is served by Freshford railway station, which opened in 1857. It has two platforms and is served by Great Western Railway and South Western Railway. A half-hourly peak and hourly off-peak service is provided northbound to Bath Spa and Bristol and southbound to Bradford-on-Avon, Trowbridge, Westbury and then further to Weymouth, Southampton and London Waterloo. In February 2006, Platform 2 at Freshford was raised by 30 cm to reduce the large stepping gap between the train and the platform. It was lowered in 1988 as part of the realignment of the track through the station to allow trains to pass at a faster speed. At the same time the platform was raised, the station also received additional improvements including better lighting and the construction of a new waiting shelter. The station gardens, funded by the Friends of Freshford, the Heart of Wessex Rail Partnership and the Freshford Parish Council, were opened on 26 July 2007 as a tribute to the Vaisey sisters, June and Dinah, who lovingly tended a garden at the station for many years. There is a brass plaque on the Bath-bound platform that commemorates this example of care, thoughtfulness and village pride. The sisters were also at the forefront of the campaign to raise the platform to allow easier access to the trains for passengers.

== Education ==
Freshford Primary School, a co-educational primary school for children aged 4 to 11, was founded in 1847 and has been recently modernised.

== Religious sites ==
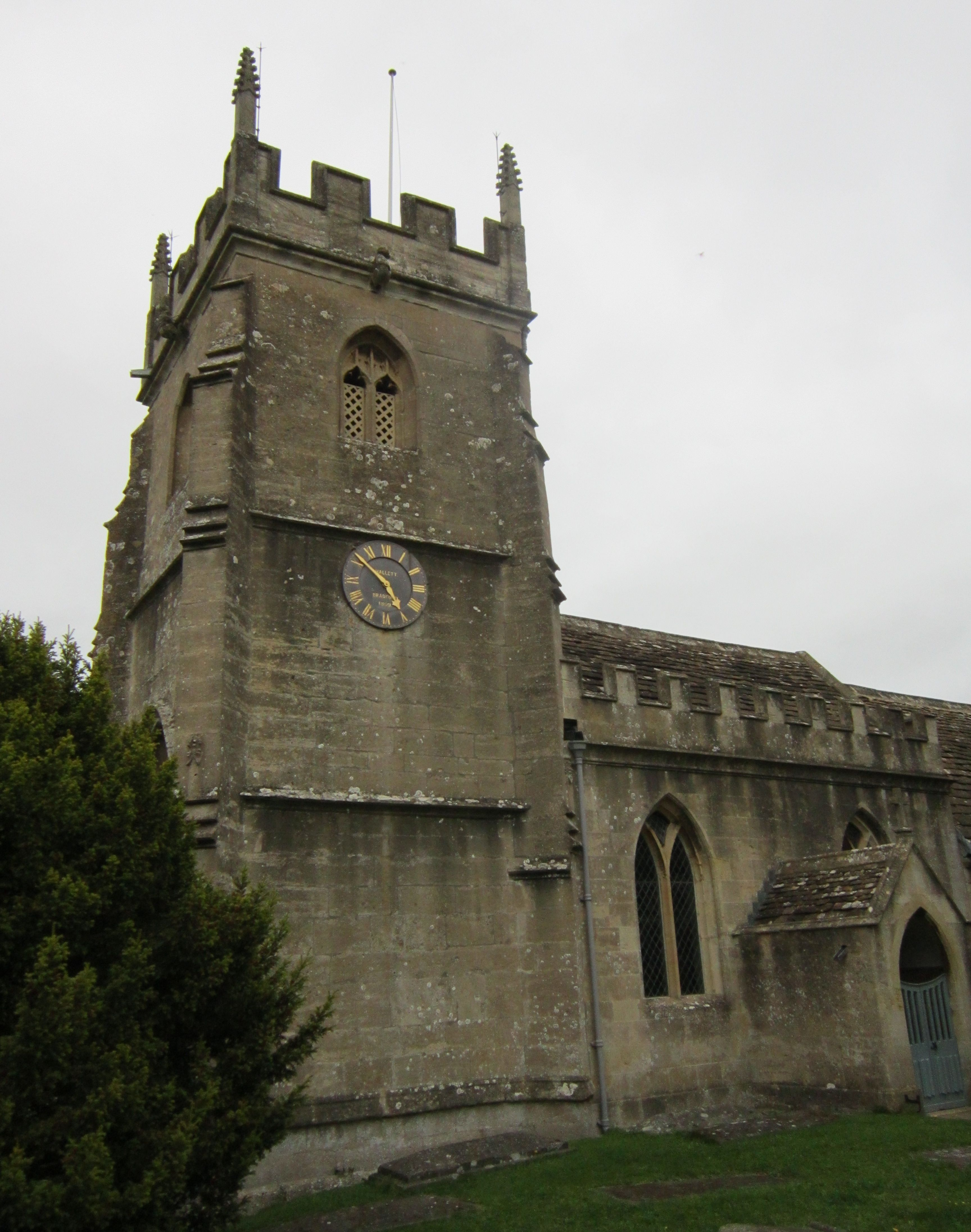
St Peter's Church

St Peter's Church, on the north side of the village, has a very old Christian marking on the back of the church and parts of the church date back to the fifteenth century. The tower was added in 1514. The church has been designated by English Heritage as a Grade II* listed building. The churchyard has a number of Georgian chest tombs, dating from the late 18th and early 19th century, four of which are listed in their own right.

The Methodist Chapel was built around 1783 and extended in 1850. It was opened by John Wesley, who preached here several times and mentioned it in his journals.

== Public services ==
Freshford Village Memorial Hall plays host to many events, including painting classes, aerobics, badminton, drama productions, and much more. It is particularly useful for children's parties, wedding receptions and similar events, the scale of charges being very competitive, and a thriving pre-school also uses the facility. It is situated on Freshford Lane between the centre of Freshford and Park Corner; it is well maintained, but is of typical mid-20th century construction and fails to meet the present requirements for energy conservation and contains some asbestos. The Hall and adjacent playing field are owned by a charity which is run by a management committee of Trustees including representatives of the regular users. The object of the charity's Foundation is "the provision and maintenance of a village hall for the use of the inhabitants of Freshford and the neighbourhood without distinction of sex or political, religious or other opinion, and in particular for use for meetings, lectures and classes, and other forms of recreation and leisure-time occupation, with the object of improving the conditions of life for the said inhabitants." The replacement of the existing hall by a modern construction with enhanced and additional facilities is under active consideration by the Trustees and local residents.

== Notable people ==
The village was the birthplace of John Bythesea, a naval officer awarded the Victoria Cross. Michael Hart was born in Freshford in c. 1814 and emigrated to Christchurch in New Zealand in 1850, where he was chosen as the 7th Mayor of Christchurch.

Siobhan Thompson, writer and comedian, grew up in Freshford.
