= River Frome, Somerset =

River in Somerset, England

River Frome
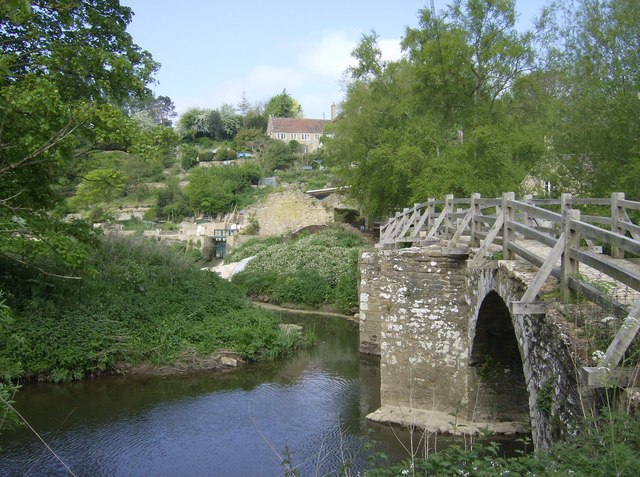
- Bridge at Tellisford over the River Frome

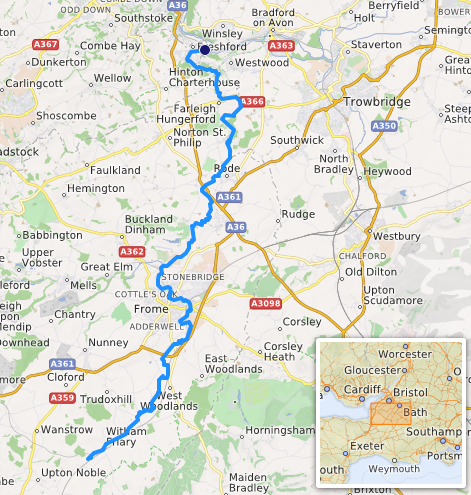
- Path of the River Frome

Location
- Country: England
- County: Somerset
- City: Frome

Physical characteristics
- Source
  - location: Witham Friary, Mendip, Somerset, England
  - coordinates: 51°10′05″N 2°22′01″W
- Mouth: River Avon
  - location: Freshford, Bath and North East Somerset, Somerset, England
  - coordinates: 51°20′17″N 2°17′50″W
- Length: 43 kilometres (27 mi)

Basin features
- Tributaries
  - left: Mells River, Henhambridge Brook
  - right: Maiden Bradley Brook, Rodden Brook

The River Frome is a river in Somerset, England. It rises near Bungalow Farm on Cannwood Lane, south-west of Witham Friary, flows north through Blatchbridge to the town of Frome, and continues in a generally northerly direction passing between the eastern edge of the Mendip Hills and Trowbridge before joining the Bristol Avon at Freshford, below Bradford on Avon.

The river is approximately 43 kilometres (27 mi) in length, comprising 15 kilometres (9.3 mi) from its source to the confluence with Maiden Bradley Brook, 10 kilometres (6.2 mi) through Frome to the confluence with the Mells River, and 18 kilometres (11 mi) to the Avon. Below Frome the river passes close to Beckington, Rode, Tellisford, Farleigh Hungerford and Iford Manor.

The name Frome comes from the Old British word ffraw meaning fair, fine or brisk and describing the flow of the river. The name was first recorded in 701 when Pope Sergius gave permission to Bishop Aldhelm to found a monastery "close to the river which is called From" (Latin: "juxta fluvium qui vocatur From").

== Weirs and bridges ==
There are many weirs on the river. Several stretches, particularly below Farleigh Hungerford, are used for coarse fishing and some trout fishing. The weirs at Tellisford and Farleigh Hungerford have long been used for wild swimming, the latter still hosted by one of the oldest river swimming clubs in England, founded in 1933. There are many bridges on the river. In the centre of Frome, the first bridge perhaps appeared in the 14th century. A later 16th-century bridge was widened in the 18th century and buildings were built across it. It remains one of only three bridges in England that have buildings across them; the others are the Pulteney Bridge in Bath and the High Bridge in Lincoln. Other significant bridges include that at Wallbridge in Frome, dated 1634, upstream of the Frome bridge. Downstream are Rode bridge, a turnpike bridge from around 1777; Tellisford bridge, a packhorse bridge probably from the 17th century; Iford bridge, circa 1400; and Freshford bridge, 16th century.

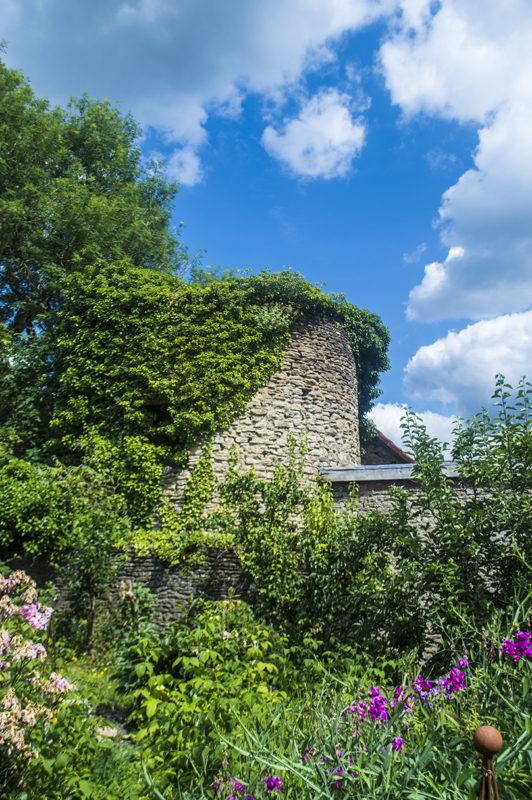
Ruins of a drying house, Willow Vale, Frome

== Mills ==
Over the centuries, the river provided power to mills, at first for the grinding of flour. Later, as local industries developed, there were mills for fulling, dyewood grinding (with associated dyehouses) and grist for animal feed or brewing. In the 18th and early 19th century, there were more than 30 mills along the Frome and its tributaries, the Mells and Rodden Brook, from Freshford to four miles south of Frome. Some of the structures can still be seen today: Tellisford, Rode, the upstream mill at Wallbridge, Frome and Blatchbridge. Others have vanished. In Frome a large complex of factory buildings for the woollen industry, with associated workers' cottages in Innox Hill, was established at Spring Gardens by the Sheppard family; these have now disappeared. The Town Mill stood just upstream of Frome bridge; all that is left are linked buildings: a semi-ruinous drying house and buildings for warehousing, dyehouses and storage, most converted to residences. The last textile mill, Tuckers, further downstream at Wallbridge, closed in 1956.

== Incidents ==
On 2 May 1932, five boys, one of them on his 10th birthday, were watching floodwater from part of an old mill just upstream from the main bridge in Frome. The old masonry collapsed; the youngest boy, aged 9, was pulled out by friends. A police constable dived in to save the others; the waters took him through the arches of the main bridge but then his cape was caught up by branches and he was pulled out. The next day four bodies were retrieved at Welshmill. The police officer was awarded the King's Police Medal for Bravery for his attempt to save their lives.

In January 2013, a policeman rescued a man from the river near the Cheese & Grain in the centre of Frome; he pulled the unconscious man from the freezing water and up the steep banks to save his life. The constable was awarded a Royal Humane Society Bravery Award.

In May 2016, the director of Cross Keys Farm Ltd, Frome, pleaded guilty to causing an unpermitted water discharge into the River Frome. The farm released slurry which killed at least 1,700 fish in the river, and caused considerable damage to its ecosystem. The stretch of river immediately downstream from the farm was a popular swimming, fishing, and canoeing site; these activities were ceased under health concerns. In order to protect the ecosystem, hydrogen peroxide was sprayed into the river to restore oxygen levels for fish, animal, and plant life. The director of the farm was fined more than £22,000.
