= Upwey railway station =

Upwey railway station may refer to:

Currently open stations:

- Upwey railway station (England), in Upwey, Dorset
- Upwey railway station, Melbourne, Australia

Disused stations:

- Upwey railway station (Abbotsbury Railway), Dorset, England
- Upwey Wishing Well Halt railway station, Dorset, England
