= Lacock Halt railway station =

British railway station (1905–1966)

Lacock Halt
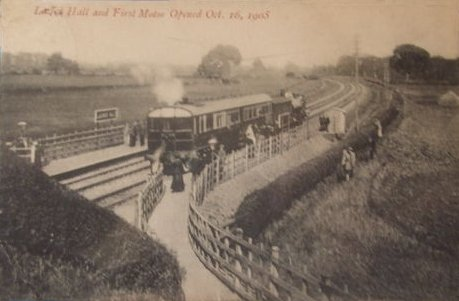

General information
- Location: Lacock, Wiltshire; England
- Coordinates: 51.42276°N 2.13726°W
- Ordnance Survey: ST 90553 69314
- Platforms: 2

History
- Opened: 16 October 1905
- Closed: 16 April 1966
- Original company: Great Western Railway
- Pre-grouping: Great Western Railway
- Post-grouping: Great Western Railway
Location

Lacock Halt was a minor railway station on the Chippenham–Trowbridge section of the former Wilts, Somerset and Weymouth Railway (WSWR), which opened as far as Westbury on 2 September 1848. This connected to the Great Western Main Line at Thingley Junction (southwest of Chippenham) and was incorporated into the Great Western Railway in March 1850 after the WSWR ran into financial difficulties.

== Opening and opposition ==
On 1 October 1905 the running of local services between Chippenham and Trowbridge was taken over by steam rail-motors in order to reduce operational costs. With the aim of increasing passenger traffic, halts at Lacock and Staverton were opened just over two weeks later on Monday 16 October – a strategy which proved so successful that two more halts were added at Beanacre and Broughton Gifford within the space of a year. This was despite an inauspicious start to the service when the inaugural train to Lacock and Staverton broke down and a steam engine had to be sent from Chippenham in order to push the stricken rail-motor to Trowbridge, although the ensemble was only half an hour late arriving at Lacock. It was reported that "a numerous company" were present to witness the occasion, with five passengers alighting and 13 boarding the train.

The enthusiasm shown for the eventual coming of the railways to Lacock contrasted sharply with the attitude of the local community half a century earlier, when plans to route the WSWR though the village and provide a station there met with fierce opposition. So it was that when the line opened, these proposals had been dropped and the railway moved around half a mile further to the west. Local opinion appears to have shifted fairly rapidly thereafter, as in the decades which followed, occasional petitions were submitted to the GWR requesting that a station serving Lacock be opened on the amended route. Such appeals were rejected, on the grounds that the likely income generated would be too low to justify the capital expenditure. This calculation changed with the advent of the rail-motor service.

== Construction and operation ==
Like the other halts, the short platforms at Lacock were created from ballast, with old railway sleepers used as edging on the track side. About 100 feet (30 m) in length, each platform provided waiting passengers with a small rudimentary shelter, fashioned in the GWR pagoda-style out of corrugated iron sheets. Since the rail-motors were equipped with retractable steps, the platforms were initially less than the usual height. However, by the outbreak of the First World War they had been raised to accommodate standard rolling stock, and the rail-motors were replaced with coaches hauled by steam locomotives in the mid-1920s. (Note: This brought to an end the practice of drivers stopping to allow passengers to board or alight from trains between stations, which was a common occurrence.) The halts were unstaffed, and therefore tickets were issued by train guards.

== Closure ==
Most steam-operated services on the line were taken over by diesel multiple units in 1958. Freight services were withdrawn in 1963. The Beeching report of the same year recommended the branch's closure on economic grounds and its fate was sealed when a survey conducted from 4–10 October 1964 showed that the average passenger train carried only 13 passengers. Lacock Halt officially closed on 16 April 1966 along with the three other stations between Chippenham and Trowbridge then still extant, (Note: In addition to Staverton Halt these comprised the stations at Holt Junction and Melksham.) the halts at Beanacre and Broughton Gifford having been closed on 2 February 1955.

Although reduced subsequently to a single track, special and diverted passenger services, as well as freight trains, continued to use the line intermittently until regular passenger services were reinstated on 13 May 1985. However, of the former stations which the route served, only Melksham was reopened.

In 2014 after much of the undergrowth was cut back, the remains of platforms at Lacock Halt were still clearly visible and in a remarkably good state of preservation, particularly on the northbound side.
