= Monkton and Came Halt railway station =

Disused railway station in Dorset, England

Coordinates: 50.6935°N 2.4503°W

Monkton and Came Halt

General information
- Location: Winterborne Monkton, Dorset; England
- Platforms: 2

Other information
- Status: Disused

History
- Original company: Great Western Railway
- Post-grouping: Great Western Railway

Key dates
- 1 July 1905: Opened as Came Bridge Halt
- 1 October 1905: Renamed Monkton and Came (Golf Links) Halt
- 7 January 1957: Closed
Location

Monkton and Came Halt was a railway station between Weymouth and Dorchester in the county of Dorset in England. It was on what is now the Heart of Wessex Line and South West Main Line.

== History ==
Opened by the Great Western Railway (GWR) in 1905, it was part of a scheme by the railway company to counter road competition. Served by local Weymouth to Dorchester rail motor trains, the station had GWR pagoda shelters and wooden platforms. The platforms were later replaced with brick built structures but the pagodas remained until road competition saw the closure of the halt in 1957. The halt was called Came Bridge when opened but the name was changed shortly afterward. There is little habitation nearby and the halt existed mainly to serve an adjacent Golf Course as well as visitors to the nearby Maiden Castle. The settlement of Winterborne Monkton is west of the former halt, and Winterborne Came to the east.

Preceding station	Historical railways	Following station
Dorchester West; Line Open, Station Open	Great Western Railway; Wilts, Somerset and Weymouth Railway	Upwey Wishing Well Halt; Line Open, Station Closed

== Present day ==
A few remains of the platforms of the halt can be seen by walking up the field adjacent to the railway in the direction of Dorchester. Trains still pass on the Heart of Wessex Line and the South West Main Line.
