= Radipole railway station =

Disused railway station in Dorset, England

Coordinates: 50.6290°N 2.4623°W

Radipole
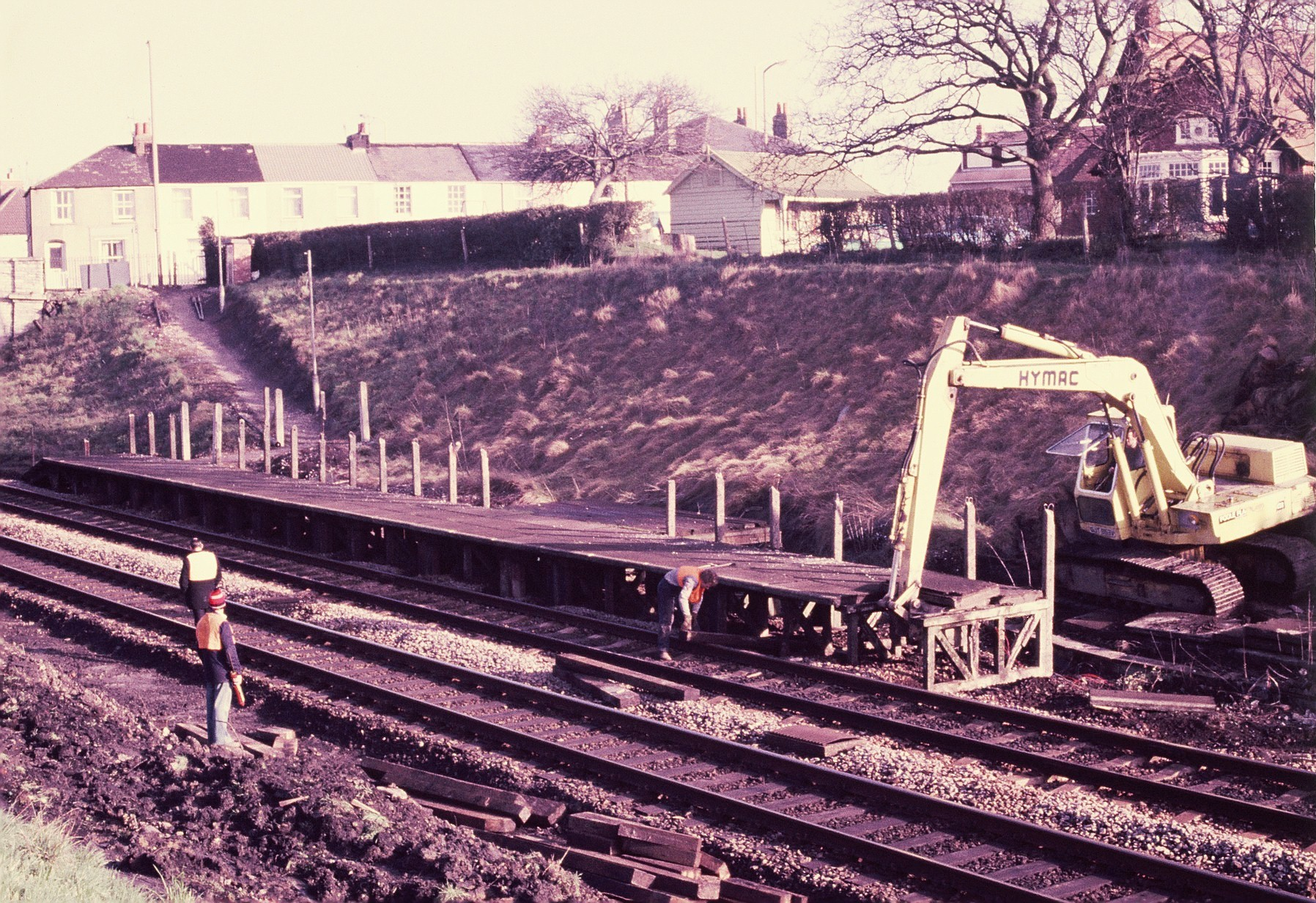
- The station being demolished in 1984

General information
- Location: Radipole, Dorset; England
- Platforms: 2

Other information
- Status: Disused

History
- Original company: Great Western Railway
- Pre-grouping: Great Western Railway
- Post-grouping: Great Western Railway

Key dates
- 1 July 1905: Opened as Radipole Halt
- 5 May 1969: Renamed Radipole
- 31 December 1983: last trains stopped at station
- 6 February 1984: Officially closed
Location

Radipole was a railway station serving Radipole a northern area of Weymouth in the county of Dorset in England.

== History ==
Opened by the GWR as Radipole Halt on 1 July 1905, it was part of a scheme by the railway company to counter road competition, particularly from Weymouth's buses. Situated 167 mi 65 chains (270.1 km) from Paddington, it was initially served by local Weymouth to Dorchester South rail motor and Abbotsbury trains. The station lasted well into the nationalised era served by Bournemouth to Weymouth trains on what is now known as the South West Main Line, as well as Westbury line DMUs. When built, its two short platforms had GWR pagoda shelters but these rusted and were replaced with bus shelters in 1978. The word Halt was dropped from its title (and from that of other surviving BR stations where it had previously appeared) on 5 May 1969.

No further services called at Radipole after 31 December 1983 as, according to the Southern Region of British Railways, its wooden platforms had become "too unsafe for use to continue". At the time, the Department for Transport was considering a proposal to withdraw passenger services from the station and British Rail had stated that heavy expenditure on repairs was not justified whilst the station's future was in doubt. Official consent was received in January 1984 and the official date of closure was 6 February 1984. In 2015, a British Rail map showing the station could still be seen at Yeovil Pen Mill station.

== The site today ==
Little now remains of the halt although the places in the wall where the access paths were bricked up can still be seen. Trains still pass on the Heart of Wessex Line and the South West Main Line.

Preceding station	Historical railways	Following station
Upwey; Line Open, Station Open	Great Western Railway; Wilts, Somerset and Weymouth Railway	Weymouth; Line Open, Station Open
