= Upwey Wishing Well Halt railway station =

Disused railway station in Dorset, England

Coordinates: 50.6648°N 2.4650°W

Upwey Wishing Well Halt
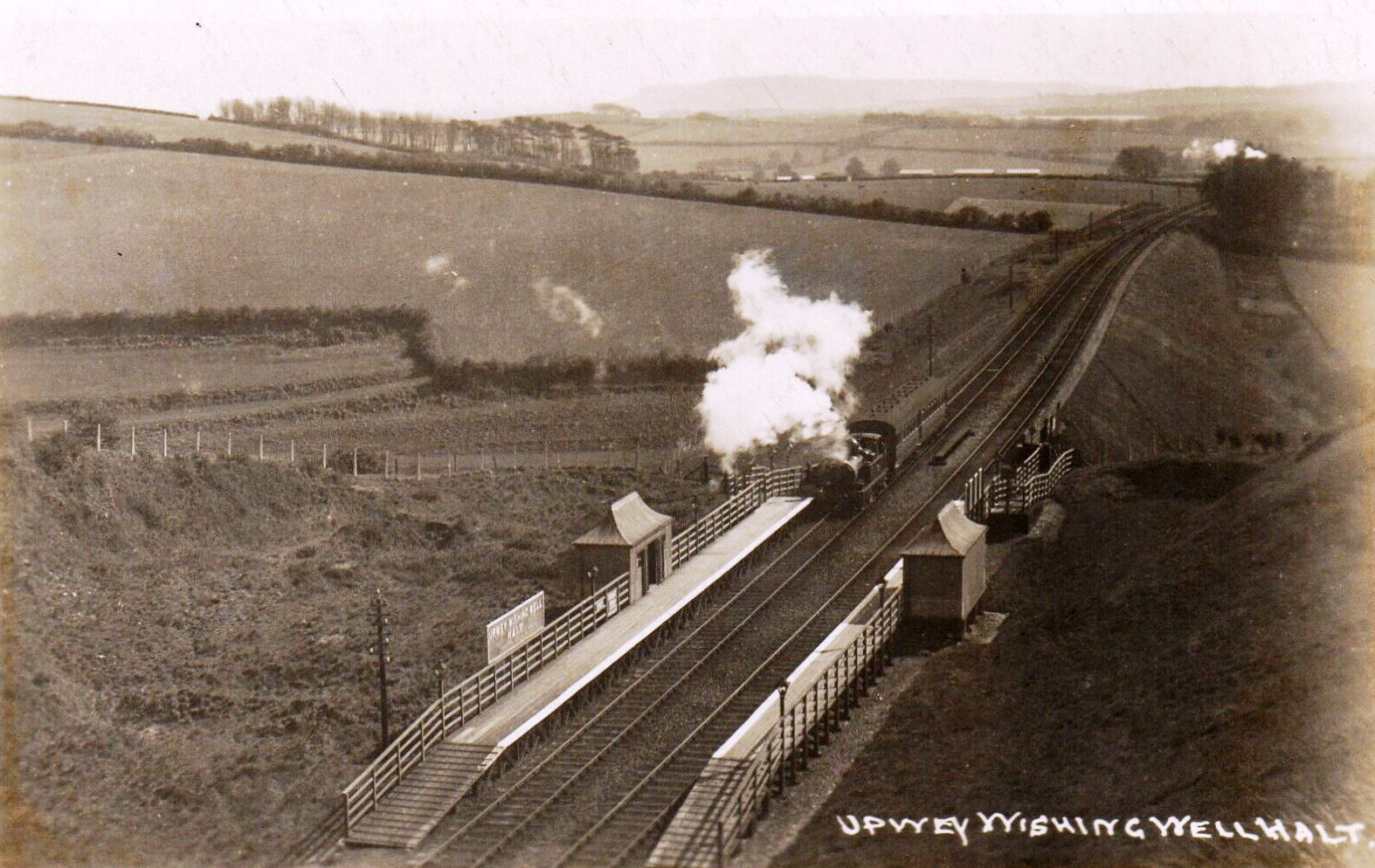

General information
- Location: Bincombe, Dorset; England
- Platforms: 2

Other information
- Status: Disused

History
- Original company: Great Western Railway
- Post-grouping: Great Western Railway

Key dates
- 28 May 1905: Opened
- 7 January 1957: Closed
Location

Upwey Wishing Well Halt was a railway station at Bincombe in the county of Dorset in England. It served the northern part of the village of Upwey, now a suburb of Weymouth, on what is now known as the Heart of Wessex Line and the South West Main Line.

== History ==
Opened by the GWR in 1905, it was part of a scheme by the railway company to counter road competition, particularly from Weymouth's buses. Served by local Weymouth to Dorchester rail motor trains, the station had GWR pagoda shelters and wooden platforms. The platforms were later replaced with brick built structures but the pagodas remained until road competition saw the closure of the halt in 1957. The site remained popular with railway photographers as from the former access paths and the A354 overbridge good pictures could be had of steam locomotives working hard on the climb from Weymouth up to Bincombe Tunnel. A remarkable thing about the site was that before the construction of the Weymouth relief road, the underbridge to the south of the platforms carried the same road as the overbridge to the north; the A354 negotiated a hairpin bend to the east of the line on the climb over Ridgeway Hill.

Preceding station	Historical railways	Following station
Monkton and Came Halt; Line Open, Station Closed	Great Western Railway; Wilts, Somerset and Weymouth Railway	Upwey; Line Open, Station Open

== Present day ==
Nothing remains of the platforms as they were removed during works for the 1988 electrification. Trains still pass on the Heart of Wessex Line and the South West Main Line.
