= Upwey railway station (England) =

Railway station in Dorset, England

Upwey
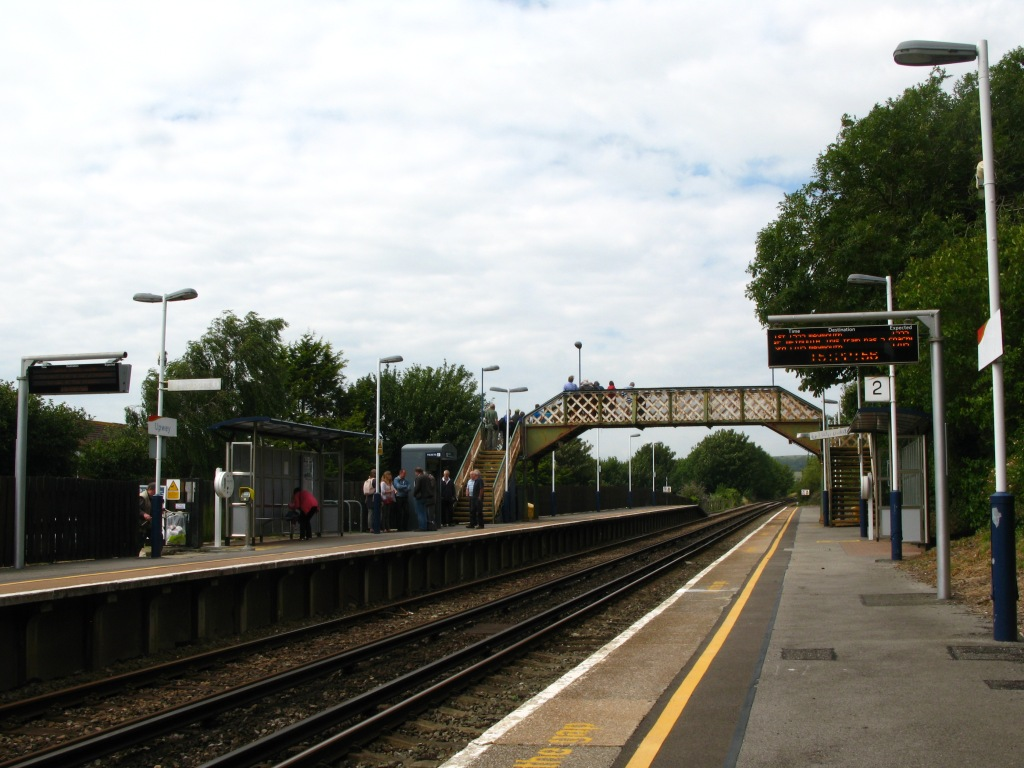

General information
- Location: Upwey, Dorset; England
- Coordinates: 50.648°N 2.466°W
- Grid reference: SY671832
- Manager: South Western Railway
- Platforms: 2

Other information
- Station code: UPW
- Classification: DfT category F2

History
- Original company: Great Western Railway
- Pre-grouping: Great Western Railway
- Post-grouping: Great Western Railway

Key dates
- 19 April 1886: Opened as Upwey Junction
- 1952: Abbotsbury branch closed
- 1 December 1952: Renamed Upwey & Broadwey
- 12 May 1980: Renamed Upwey

Passengers
- 2021/22: ▲36,086
- Interchange: ▲26,242
- 2022/23: ▲43,128
- Interchange: ▲57,243
- 2023/24: ▲46,534
- Interchange: ▼21,420
- 2024/25: ▲53,534
- Interchange: ▼17,018
- 2025/26: ▲59,554
- Interchange: ▲24,006
Location
Notes
- Passenger statistics from the Office of Rail and Road

Upwey railway station serves the Broadwey, Upwey and Littlemoor suburbs of Weymouth in Dorset, England. The station is situated on the South West Main Line, 140 miles 31 chains (225.9 km) from London Waterloo and on the Heart of Wessex Line, 166 miles 30 chains (267.8 km) from London Paddington.

== History ==
The first station near this location, simply named Upwey, was opened in 1871 by the Great Western Railway (GWR). On 19 April 1886 that station was replaced by the current station, then named Upwey Junction, a railway junction that opened south of the original station to provide access to the single track Abbotsbury branch. The branch was absorbed into the GWR and survived for 66 years before closure under British Railways in 1952. On the closure of the branch Upwey Junction was renamed Upwey and Broadwey on 1 December 1952, and took its current name, Upwey, on 12 May 1980.

During the Network SouthEast era, the station was refurbished with the trademark red lighting poles, station benches and monitor screens for train arrivals. Rubble from the rebuilt Weymouth station was used to fill in the former Abbotsbury platform for use as a car park. This was done in time for the extension of electrification from Bournemouth to Weymouth in 1988.

Two further stations had Upwey in their name. To the north of Upwey Junction existed a halt called Upwey Wishing Well Halt, while around the bend on the Abbotsbury branch was a station which had originally been called Broadwey. However its name was changed to Upwey as it kept being confused with Broadway, Worcestershire, also on the Great Western Railway.

Thomas Hardy wrote a poem At the Railway Station, Upway, about waiting for a train at a country station. In the days of steam, a favourite excursion was from Weymouth to Upwey, and then on to tea at the Upwey Wishing Well by charabanc.

Preceding station	Historical railways	Following station
Broadwey	Great Western Railway; Abbotsbury Branch	Radipole
Upwey Wishing Well Halt	Great Western Railway; London Paddington-Weymouth	Radipole
Upwey Wishing Well Halt	London and South Western Railway; London Waterloo-Weymouth	Radipole

=== Accidents and incidents ===
On 24 January 2013, a passenger train caught fire at Upwey.

== Services ==
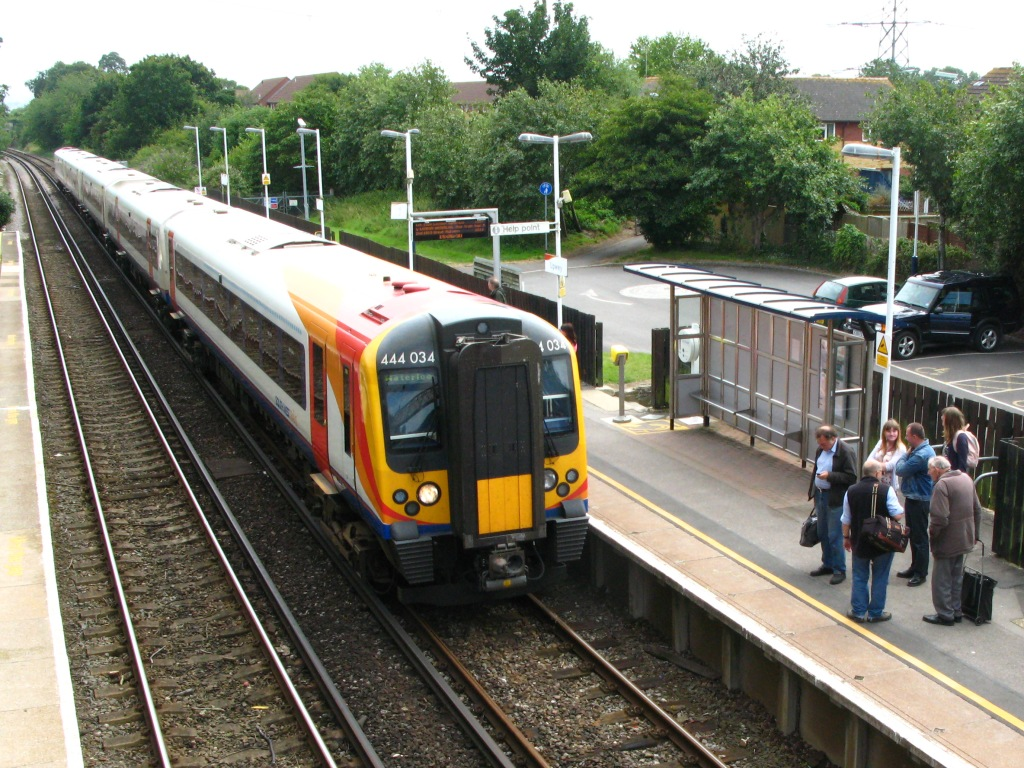
A South West Trains service to London Waterloo

Services are provided by two train operating companies:

- South Western Railway runs one train per hour in each direction between Weymouth and London Waterloo. Northbound, this service calls at most stops to Winchester, then Basingstoke and Clapham Junction.
- Great Western Railway generally operates eight trains per day between Weymouth and Bristol Temple Meads, with a number of these continuing on to Gloucester. On Sundays, this is reduced to between three and five trains per day depending on the time of year.

Preceding station	National Rail	Following station
Dorchester South	South Western Railway South West Main Line	Weymouth
Dorchester West	Great Western Railway Heart of Wessex Line	Weymouth

== Bibliography ==
- J.H. Lucking (1968). Railways of Dorset. Railway Correspondence and travel Society.
- Brian L. Jackson (1989). The Abbotsbury Branch. Wild Swan Publications Ltd. ISBN 0-906867-80-0.
- Butt, R.V.J. (1995). The Directory of Railway Stations. Yeovil: Patrick Stephens Ltd. ISBN 1-85260-508-1. R508.
