= Dorchester West railway station =

Railway station in Dorset, England

Dorchester West
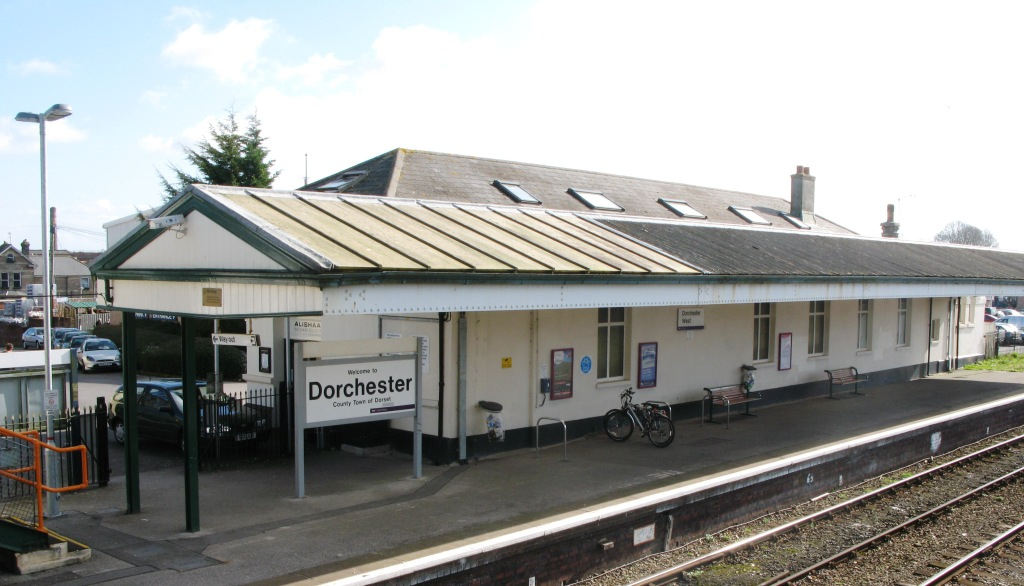

General information
- Location: Dorchester, Dorset; England
- Coordinates: 50.711°N 2.443°W
- Grid reference: SY688902
- Manager: Great Western Railway
- Platforms: 2

Other information
- Station code: DCW
- Classification: DfT category F1

History
- Original company: Great Western Railway

Key dates
- 20 January 1857: Opened

Passengers
- 2020/21: ▼22,134
- Interchange: ▼3
- 2021/22: ▲66,992
- Interchange: ▲23
- 2022/23: ▲82,196
- Interchange: ▲43
- 2023/24: ▲89,732
- Interchange: ▼37
- 2024/25: ▲96,844
Location
Notes
- Passenger statistics from the Office of Rail and Road

Dorchester West is one of two railway stations that serve the town of Dorchester in Dorset, England, the other being Dorchester South. It is managed by Great Western Railway, which also operates all services that stop here. The station is located on the Heart of Wessex Line between Castle Cary and Weymouth, at the southern end of a single track section from Maiden Newton. It is sited 161.63 mi (260.12 km) from London Paddington, via Swindon and Westbury. The line becomes double at the station and remains so to just before nearby Dorchester Junction, where the line joins the South West Main Line from London Waterloo to Weymouth.

I t was listed at Grade II in 1975.

== History ==
The station was opened by the Great Western Railway on 20 January 1857, when it completed the former Wilts, Somerset and Weymouth line from Castle Cary and Yeovil through to Weymouth.

In October 2021, a new ramp was opened allowing step-free access to platform 1.

Preceding station	Historical railways	Following station
Bradford Peverell & Stratton Halt	Great Western Railway; Wilts, Somerset and Weymouth Railway	Monkton and Came Halt

=== Accidents and incidents ===
An accident occurred at this station in 1974 when an excursion train from Hereford to Weymouth, on its return journey, did not stop at the signal controlling the entry to the single line section, and ran into the sand drag. The locomotive (a Class 47) ran right through the sand drag and out the other side, followed by a couple of coaches. Eighteen passengers suffered minor injuries in the derailment, but no one was seriously hurt. The passengers were taken home by train via Southampton later that evening, and the loco was subsequently re-railed and recovered during the night several weeks later.

== Services ==
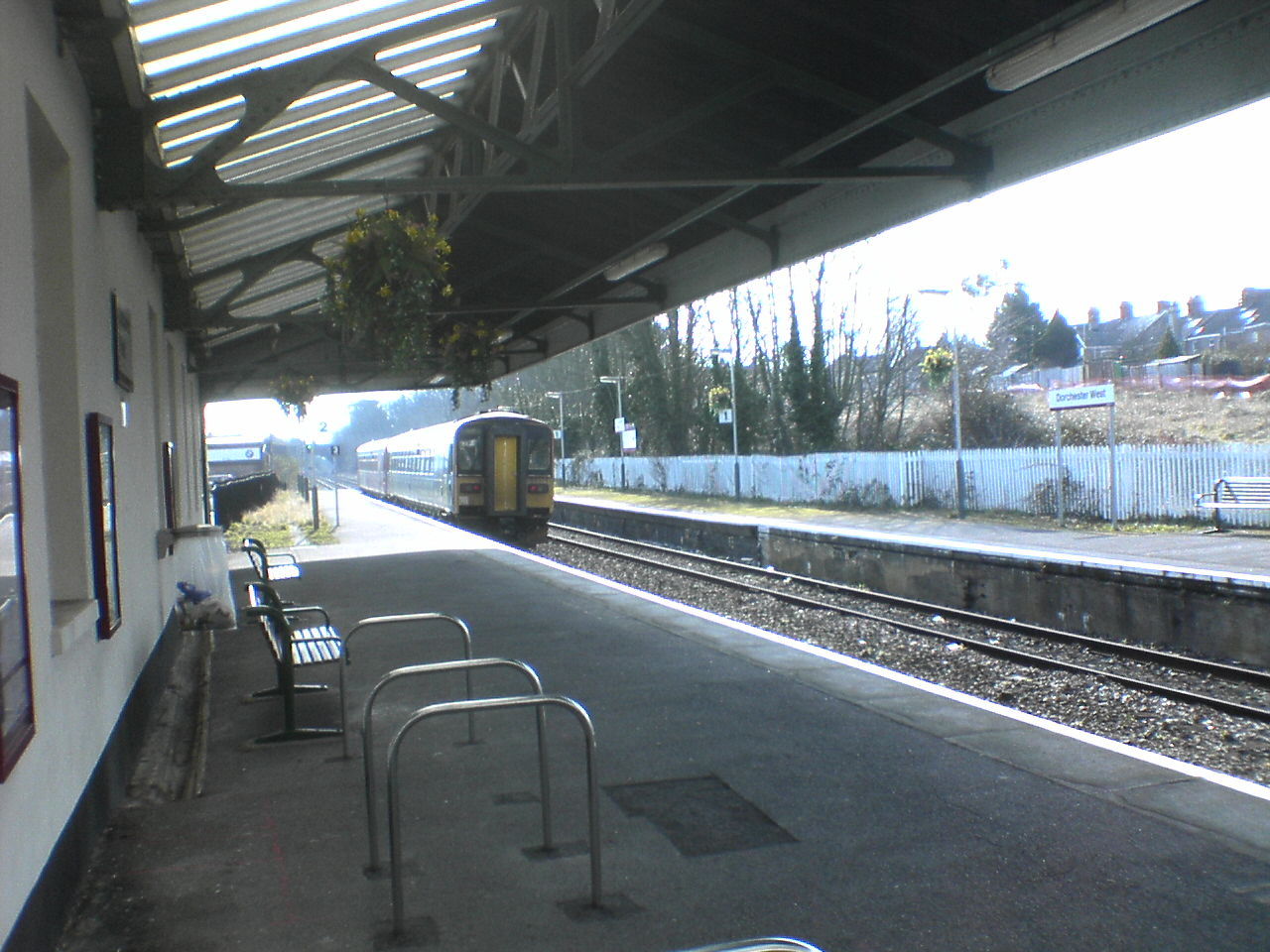
Two Class 153s leaving the station for Weymouth

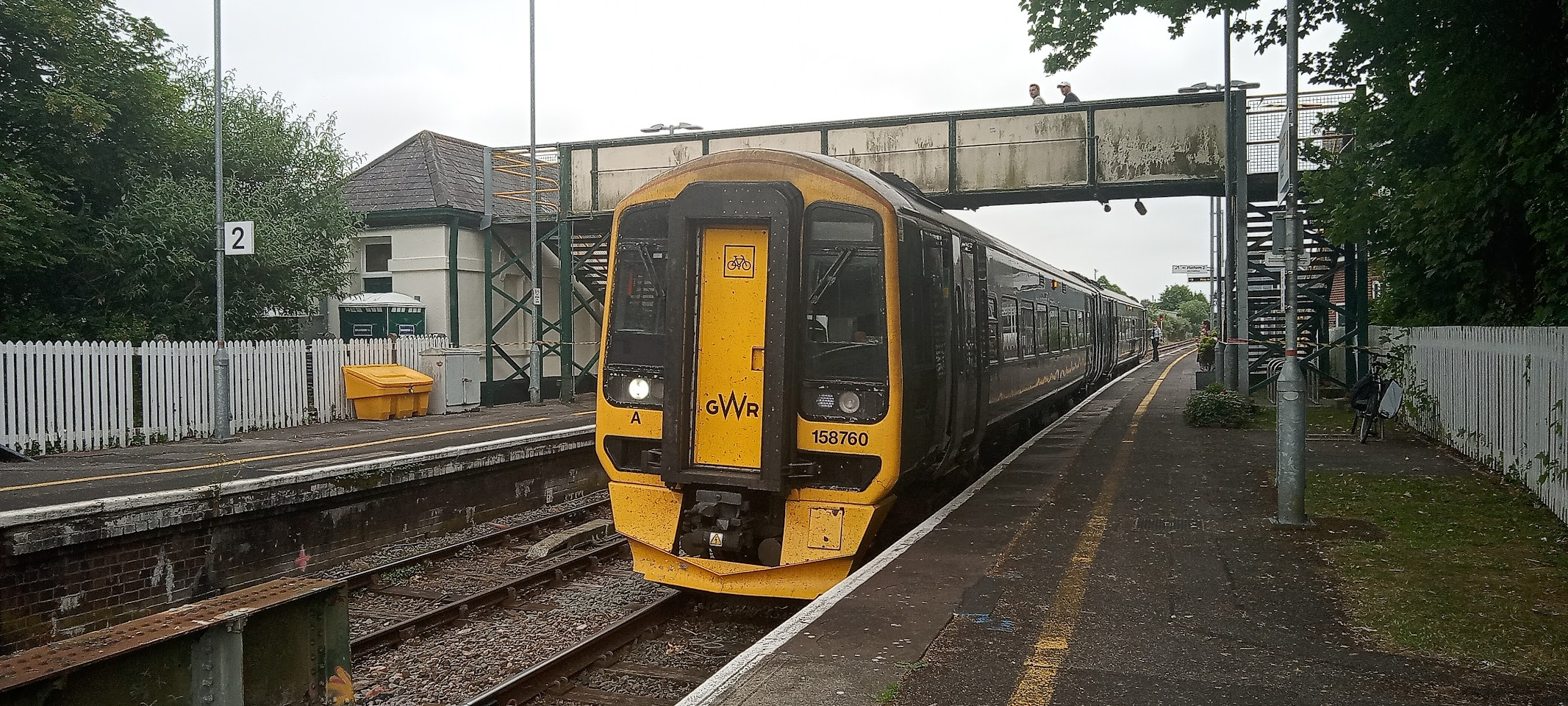
A Class 158 at platform 1, operating a service towards Yeovil in 2022

The station is served by Great Western Railway, who operate services between Gloucester, Bristol Temple Meads and Weymouth. Services generally operate every two hours in each direction.

More frequent services, usually every hour, are available to Weymouth, as well as services to London Waterloo from the nearby Dorchester South station.

Preceding station	National Rail	Following station
Maiden Newton	Great Western Railway; Heart of Wessex Line	Upwey

== See also ==
- Ordnance Survey 1937 map of Dorchester showing the location of the two stations
