= Cattistock railway station =

Disused railway station in Dorset, England

Coordinates: 50.79071°N 2.58043°W

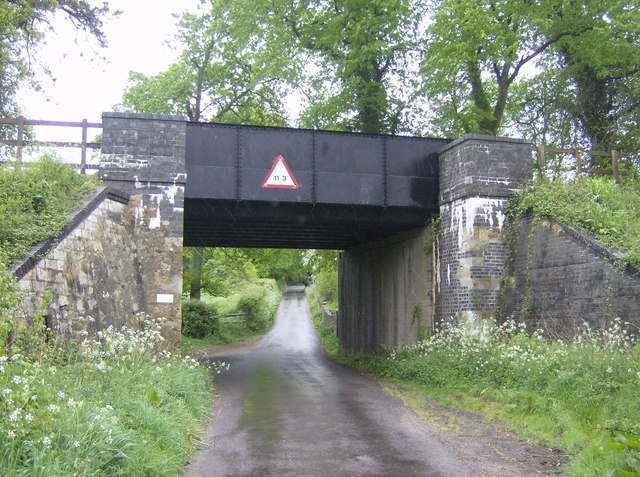
The railway bridge in 2007

Cattistock Halt railway station was a railway station in the county of Dorset in England. It was served by trains on what is now known as the Heart of Wessex Line. The station was initially timber but was rebuilt in 1959: the two platforms each with a concrete shelter were standard products of the former Southern Railway concrete factory at Exmouth Junction.

== History ==
Opened on 3 August 1931 by the Great Western Railway, it was placed in the Western Region when the railways were nationalised in 1948. The station closed when local trains were withdrawn following the Beeching Report, taking effect on 3 October 1966.

== Accidents and incidents ==
- On 24 October 1882, a passenger train was derailed near Cattistock when a bridge collapsed under it due to a storm. One person was severely injured, several others were also injured.

Preceding station	Historical railways	Following station
Evershot; Line Open Station Closed	Great Western Railway; Wilts, Somerset and Weymouth Railway	Maiden Newton
