= Trowbridge railway station =

Railway station in Wiltshire, England

Trowbridge
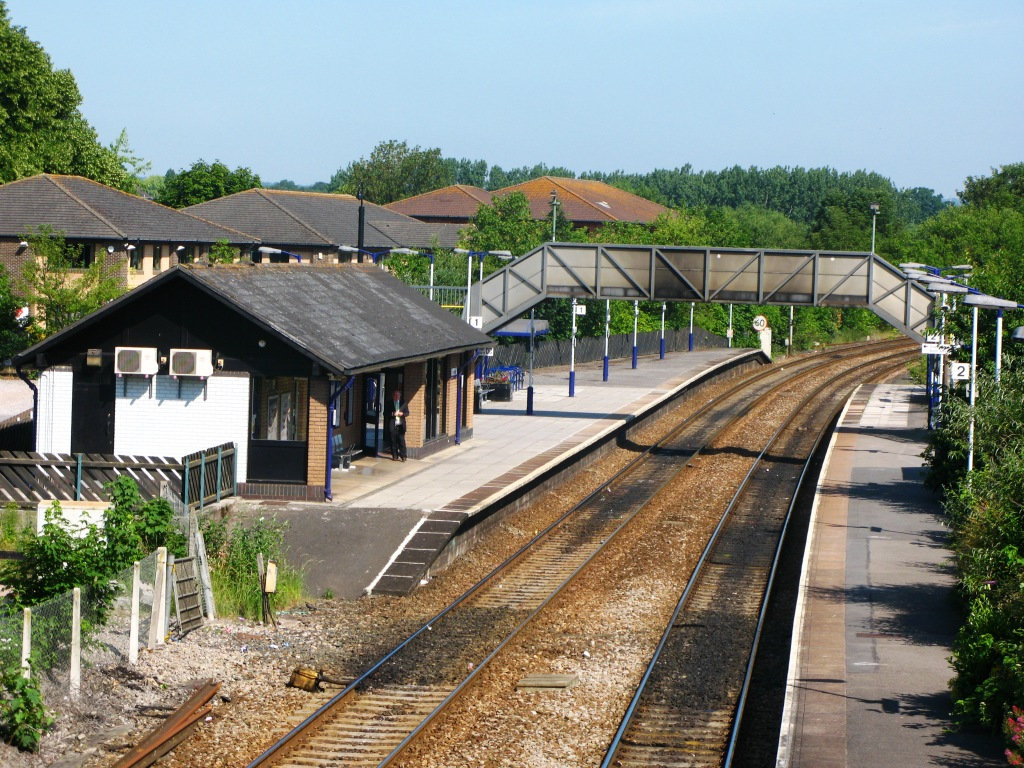

General information
- Location: Trowbridge, Wiltshire; England
- Coordinates: 51.3200°N 2.2143°W
- Grid reference: ST851578
- Manager: Great Western Railway
- Platforms: 2

Other information
- Station code: TRO
- Classification: DfT category D

History
- Original company: Wilts, Somerset and Weymouth Railway
- Pre-grouping: Great Western Railway
- Post-grouping: Great Western Railway

Key dates
- 1848: Opened

Passengers
- 2020/21: ▼0.252 million
- Interchange: ▼10,682
- 2021/22: ▲0.640 million
- Interchange: ▲31,481
- 2022/23: ▲0.735 million
- Interchange: ▲36,255
- 2023/24: ▲0.841 million
- Interchange: ▲36,465
- 2024/25: ▲0.904 million
- Interchange: ▼36,224
Location
Notes
- Passenger statistics from the Office of Rail and Road

Trowbridge railway station serves the county town of Trowbridge in Wiltshire, England. The station is 24 miles (39 km) south east of Bristol Temple Meads on the Wessex Main Line and is managed by Great Western Railway.

Originally opened by the Wilts, Somerset and Weymouth Railway in 1848, as part of their Thingley Junction to Westbury line, it gained a link to Bath and Bristol nine years later thanks to the Great Western Railway. This is now the main line, as the original route to Chippenham has been singled and reduced to secondary status.

== Description ==
The small station building is located on the northbound platform (platform 1). This platform is for trains to Bath, Bristol and Cardiff. Platform 2, on the southbound line is for trains to Westbury, London and the South Coast.

The station building contains a staffed ticket office, benches, vending machines, one electronic information sign, timetable information, bus timetable information and free leaflets, toilet facilities and Free Metro newspapers are available. On Platform 1 there are Two electronic information signs, covered bike stands, benches, shelter with benches, one self-service ticket machine. Platform 2 has a two electronic display signs, covered bike racks, train timetables, a shelter with benches, one self-service ticket machine, public telephone and taxi hiring.

== Services ==
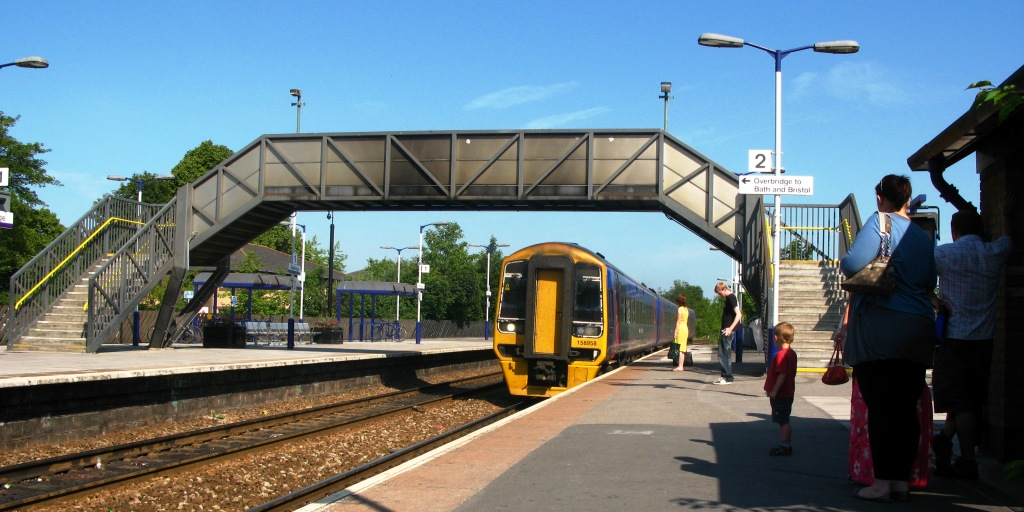
A train to Portsmouth

Regular service (at present half-hourly each way Mon-Sat, hourly on Sundays) is provided by Great Western Railway to Bath Spa, Bristol Temple Meads and either Gloucester or Cardiff Central northbound and Weymouth or Southampton Central and Portsmouth Harbour in the south.

The original WS&WR line diverges to the north of Trowbridge, formerly carried a limited passenger service (two per day each way Mon-Sat, one each way on Sundays) to/from Swindon via Melksham and Chippenham. This was improved to a two-hourly service (8 trains each way total on weekdays, 5 each way on Sundays) at the December 2013 timetable change. Two services continue beyond Swindon through to Cheltenham Spa on weekdays only.

There is also an early morning direct service to London Paddington from Bristol Temple Meads, departing Trowbridge at 5.41 am, operated by either a Class 800 or Class 802 'Intercity Express Train'. There is no return service.

Preceding station	National Rail	Following station
Melksham	Great Western Railway; Swindon–Westbury	Westbury
Bradford-on-Avon	Great Western Railway; Great Malvern/Gloucester–Westbury/South Coast	Westbury
Bradford-on-Avon	Great Western Railway; Cardiff Central–Portsmouth Harbour	Westbury
