= Melksham railway station =

Railway station in Wiltshire, England

Melksham
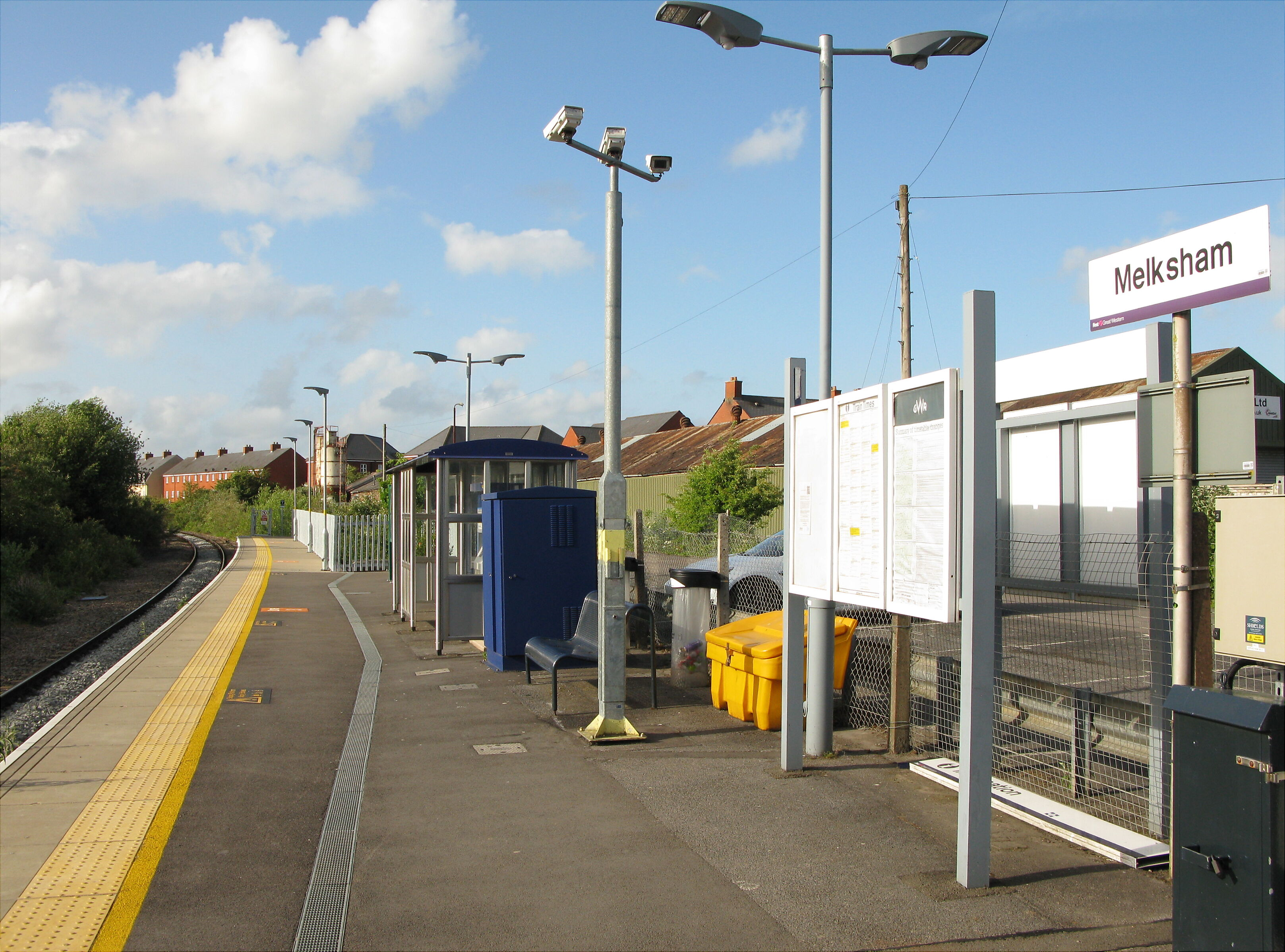

General information
- Location: Melksham, Wiltshire, England
- Coordinates: 51.3798°N 2.1446°W
- Grid reference: ST900645
- Manager: Great Western Railway
- Platforms: 1

Other information
- Station code: MKM
- Classification: DfT category F2

History
- Original company: Wilts, Somerset and Weymouth Railway
- Pre-grouping: Great Western Railway
- Post-grouping: Great Western Railway

Key dates
- 5 September 1848: Opened
- 18 April 1966: Closed
- 13 May 1985: Reopened

Passengers
- 2020/21: ▼18,800
- 2021/22: ▲52,342
- 2022/23: ▲64,206
- 2023/24: ▼63,350
- 2024/25: ▼60,930
Location
Notes
- Passenger statistics from the Office of Rail and Road

Melksham railway station is a railway station serving the town of Melksham in Wiltshire, England. It is 100 miles 13 chains (100.16 miles, 161.20 km) from London Paddington, on the TransWilts Line between Chippenham and Trowbridge.

== History ==
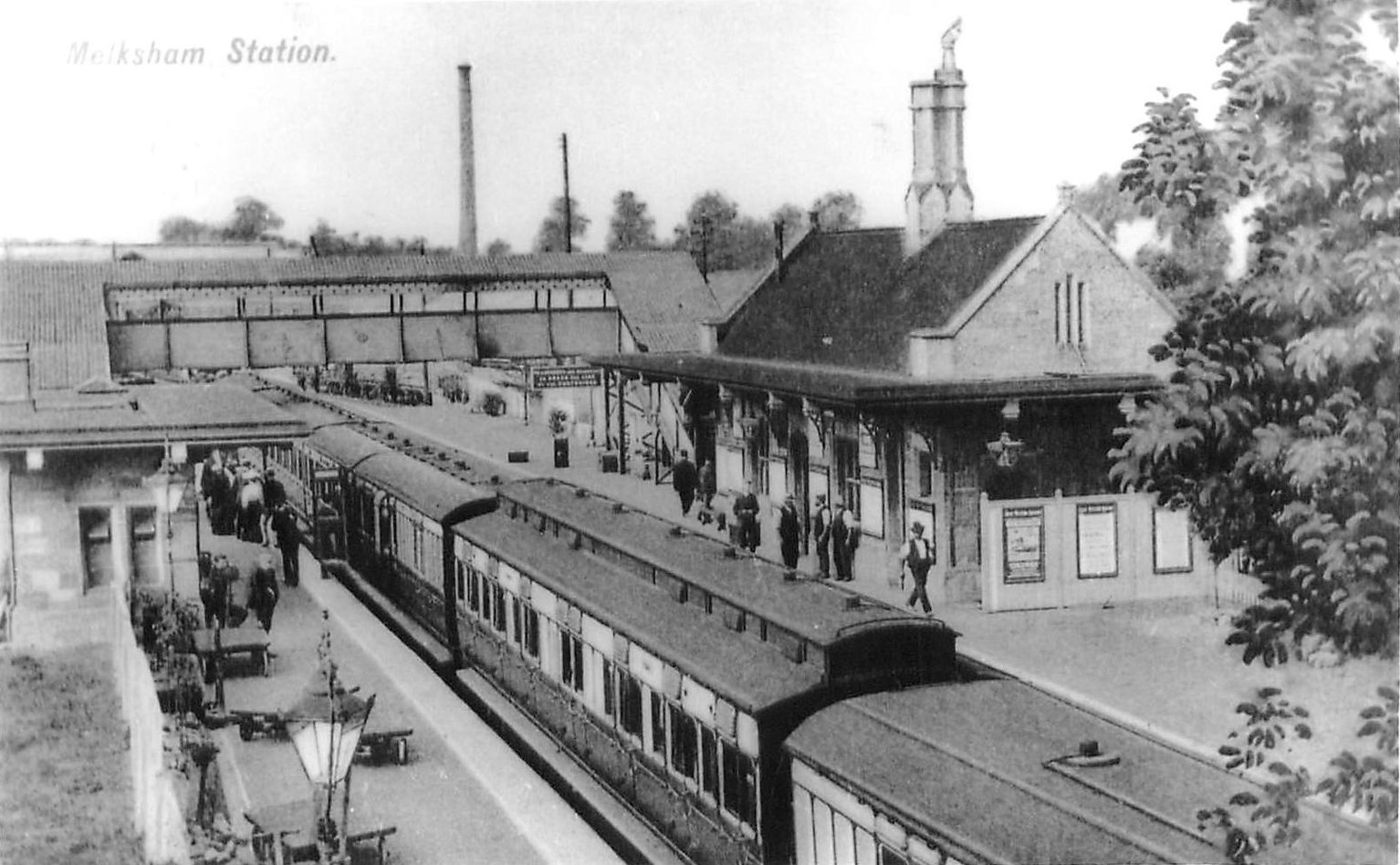
The station circa 1905

The station was opened with the original section of the line by the Wilts, Somerset and Weymouth Railway, between Thingley Junction and Westbury, on 5 September 1848. British Railways closed the station from 18 April 1966 and soon afterwards the line through the station was singled, the station buildings were demolished and the up platform was removed. The station reopened to passengers from 13 May 1985, although the short platform meant that trains longer than one carriage could not open all doors. In July 2018, the platform was improved and lengthened to cater for trains of up to three carriages.

Preceding station	Historical railways	Following station
Beanacre Halt; Line open, station closed	Great Western Railway; Wessex Main Line	Broughton Gifford Halt; Line open, station closed

== Facilities ==
From summer 2015, a ticket vending machine has been in use on the platform, enabling passengers to either purchase their tickets or collect pre-paid tickets for their journey. An additional 20 free car parking spaces were provided at the same time. There is covered cycle accommodation, CCTV and a passenger shelter.

As of 2020, there is a 'next train' digital display on the station platform, as well as a more detailed arrivals and departures screen in the adjoining car park. In that year, the local Rail User Group turned a disused building close to the station into a café.

== Passenger volume ==
Passenger Volume at Melksham
	2002–03	2004–05	2005–06	2006–07	2007–08	2008–09	2009–10	2010–11	2011–12	2012–13	2013–14	2014–15	2015–16	2016–17	2017–18	2018–19	2019–20	2020–21	2021–22	2022–23
Entries and exits	19,143	27,446	24,426	22,001	38,081	27,656	10,028	11,046	11,326	12,080	23,930	51,858	60,676	74,666	74,220	74,534	75,292	18,800	52,342	64,206

The statistics cover twelve month periods that start in April.

== Services ==
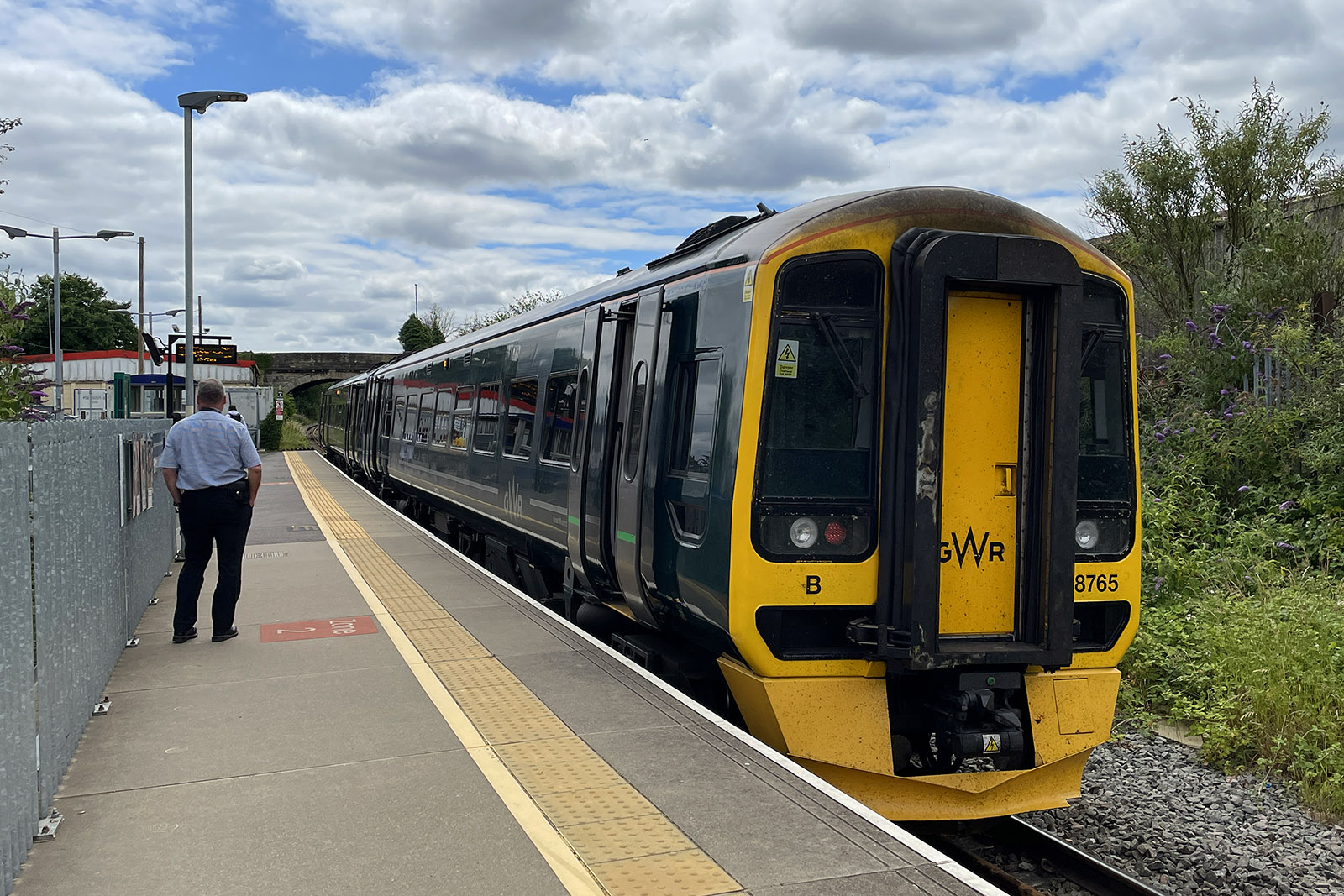
A Great Western Railway Class 158 calls at the station

Great Western Railway (GWR) operates services approximately every two hours each way between Swindon and Westbury, with additional services at peak times; there are nine departures in total. On Sundays, there are seven services each way. Two weekday southbound services run through to Southampton Central and two northbound services continue to Cheltenham Spa.

Between December 2006 and December 2013, Melksham station was served by two trains each way per day (one train on Sundays) between Swindon and Westbury, operated by Great Western Railway, a reduction from five each way per day before the December 2006 timetable change.

Preceding station	National Rail	Following station
Chippenham	Great Western Railway; Wessex Main Line	Trowbridge

== Community rail ==
With Melksham being served by trains on the Swindon to Westbury route, it comes under the remit of the TransWilts Community Interest Company (CIC) which is accredited by the Department for Transport. Melksham Railway Development Group formed in 1995 to promote Melksham station and train journeys to and from the town.

The Save The Train group was launched in 2005, to raise public awareness that services along the TransWilts Line were being reduced. Prior to the introduction of extra services in late 2013, "Save the Train" members transferred to the community element of the TransWilts Community Rail Partnership.

== Bibliography ==
- Quick, Michael (2023). Railway Passenger Stations in Great Britain: A Chronology (PDF) (5th ed.). London: Railway and Canal Historical Society.
