= Wilts, Somerset and Weymouth Railway =

Former railway company in England

The Wilts, Somerset and Weymouth Railway (WS&WR) was an early railway company in south-western England. It obtained an act of Parliament giving powers to build the line in 1845 to build a railway from near Chippenham in Wiltshire, southward to Salisbury and Weymouth in Dorset. It opened the first part of the network but found it impossible to raise further money and sold its line to the Great Western Railway (GWR) in 1850.

The GWR took over the construction and undertook to build an adjacent connecting line; the network was complete in 1857. In the early years of the 20th century the GWR wanted to shorten its route from London to the West of England and built "cut-off" lines in succession to link part of the WS&WR network, so that by 1906 the express trains ran over the Westbury to Castle Cary section. In 1933 further improvements were made, and that part of the line was established as part of the "holiday line" to Devon and Cornwall.

The network was already a major trunk route for coal from South Wales coalfields to southern England, and for Channel Islands farm produce imported through Weymouth Harbour, as well as providing a boat train route, and carrying flows from Bristol to Southampton and Portsmouth.

Much of the network is in operation today, but the Devizes and Radstock branches have closed.

== Origins ==
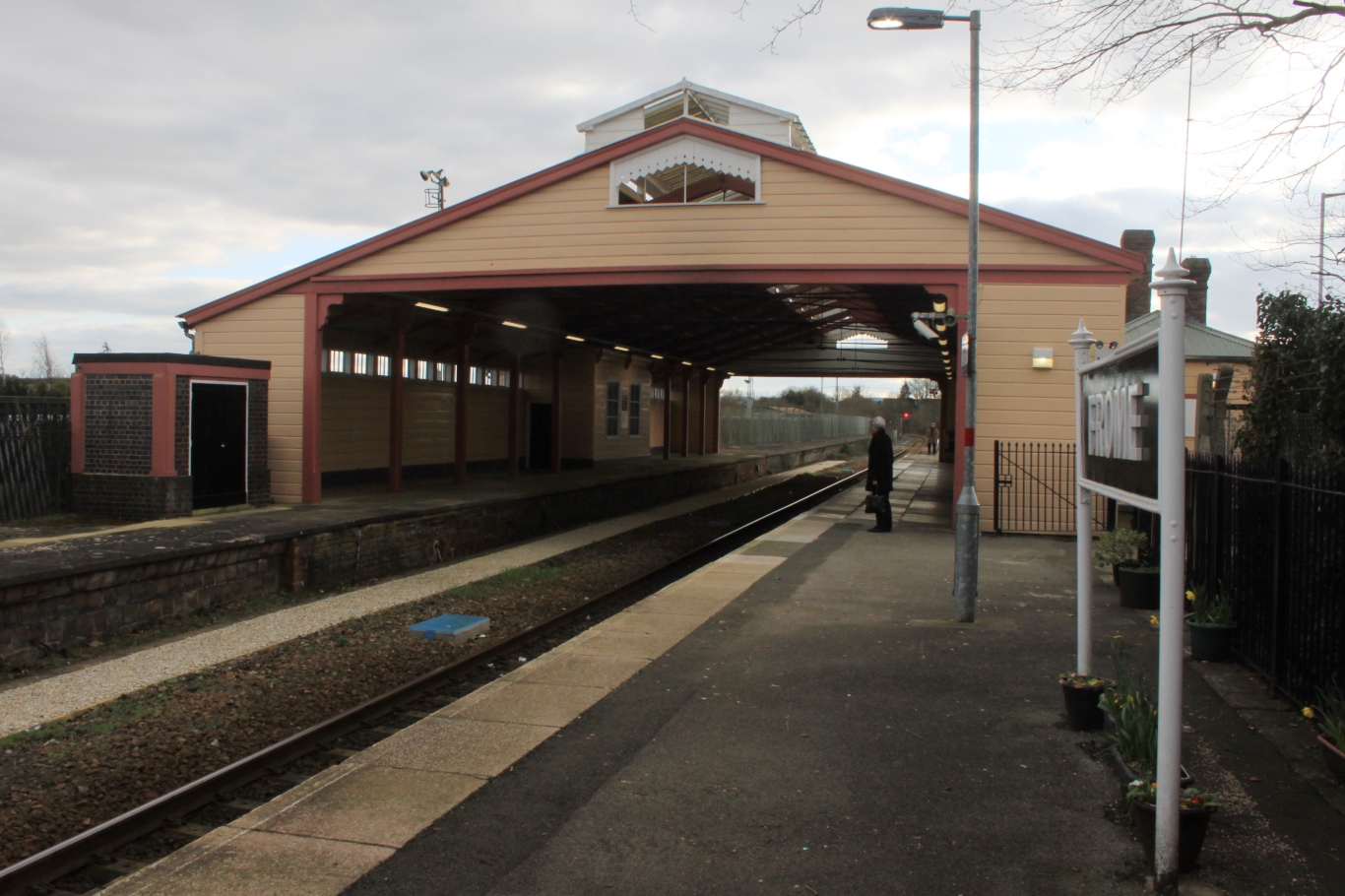
Frome station and roof in 2016

The Great Western Railway (GWR) had opened its main line from London to Bristol in 1841, and the London and Southampton Railway had opened in 1840; and its successor the London and South Western Railway (LSWR) was extending westwards. The advantage to communities connected to the new railways was immediately apparent; in contrast, places remote from these lines felt strongly the disadvantage at which they were placed.

The areas of south-west Wiltshire were prosperous from sheep farming and wool manufacture, and quickly saw that they too needed a railway. (Note: In fact the original Great Western Railway Act had included a branch from near Chippenham to Bradford-on-Avon; this did not get built.) The LSWR proposed a line from Basingstoke to Swindon, and at this time there was intense rivalry between them and the GWR to control territory: the railway that was first to have a line in an area would have an enormous competitive advantage there, and could often use that line as a base to extend further. The GWR was building its lines on the 7 ft 1/4 in (2,140 mm) broad gauge and the LSWR on what is now the 4 ft 8 1/2 in (1,435 mm) standard gauge (referred to at the time as "narrow gauge"), and they were anxious to ensure that any new independent railway should be on their own preferred track gauge; this rivalry is characterised as the "gauge wars".

The proposed LSWR line to Swindon, the heart of GWR territory, was met with furious opposition, and the GWR promoted two nominally independent lines, the Berks and Hants Railway and the Wilts, Somerset and Weymouth Railway. At the first meeting of the nascent GWR company on 9 July 1844, Charles Alexander Saunders, secretary of the GWR, suggested that the necessary sum of £650,000 could be secured on a GWR guarantee; the GWR would be the lessee of the line, and would directly subscribe half of the capital.

=== Mission creep ===
The Bristol and Exeter Railway (B&ER), a broad gauge line friendly to the GWR, was proposing a line to Weymouth from its own main line at Durston, west of Bridgwater, and the WS&WR promoters decided to add a branch to their own line from Frome to Yeovil to meet the B&ER line there, forming a large triangle and making (with the GWR line) a direct route from London to Weymouth. In September 1844 the Board of Trade assented to this addition; this added £350,000 to the capital required: it would now cost £1 million. A month later, at a meeting in Frome on 23 October 1844, the B&ER announced that it had decided to alter the route of its Weymouth branch, running from Durston much further south through Bridport, with a branch to Yeovil. The Yeovil to Weymouth section would not be built, so the WS&WR added that to their own scheme: the capital cost was now to be £1.5 million.

The cities of Bath and Bristol felt left out of these connections to the South Coast, and the Taunton Courier recorded that a deputation of merchants and traders of Bristol had gone to the Great Western Board; they were not warmly received, and

They did obtain that Board's direct admission ... that it was neither expected nor intended that the line to Thingley was to be used as a Communication between Bath and Bradford, but that the intercourse between those two places would be continued as heretofore by coaches and canal.

— Taunton Courier

Hadfield adds in a footnote on the same page that "In fact the [west] curve at Thingley [near Chippenham] was specifically authorised (but not built) to give connection between Bath and Trowbridge."

At this period the Board of Trade determined the relative merits of competing proposals, and the huge stakes meant that it was crucial to secure their approval; it was reported in the London Gazette on 31 December 1844 that the Board of Trade were supportive of the WS&WR scheme, provided the GWR sought to construct a connecting line from Bath to join the WS&WR. The GWR immediately undertook to apply for an act of Parliament giving authority for such a line in the 1846 session. However the frenzy of projecting railways at this time was such that the Kennet and Avon Canal proposed laying broad gauge tracks on each side of their canal; this would be the London, Newbury and Bath Direct Railway. It may have been a startling scheme, but it passed its second reading in Parliament in the 1846 session, when the Berks and Hants Railway Bill was thrown out. However the Kennet and Avon company was evidently bought off by the GWR, for they dropped their scheme; their minutes of 9 September 1846 record the first instalment of £5,000 having been received in payment.

Having deliberated, the Board of Trade announced their decision: they found in favour of the WS&WR scheme, rejecting the LSWR's Swindon line.

=== The act obtained at last ===
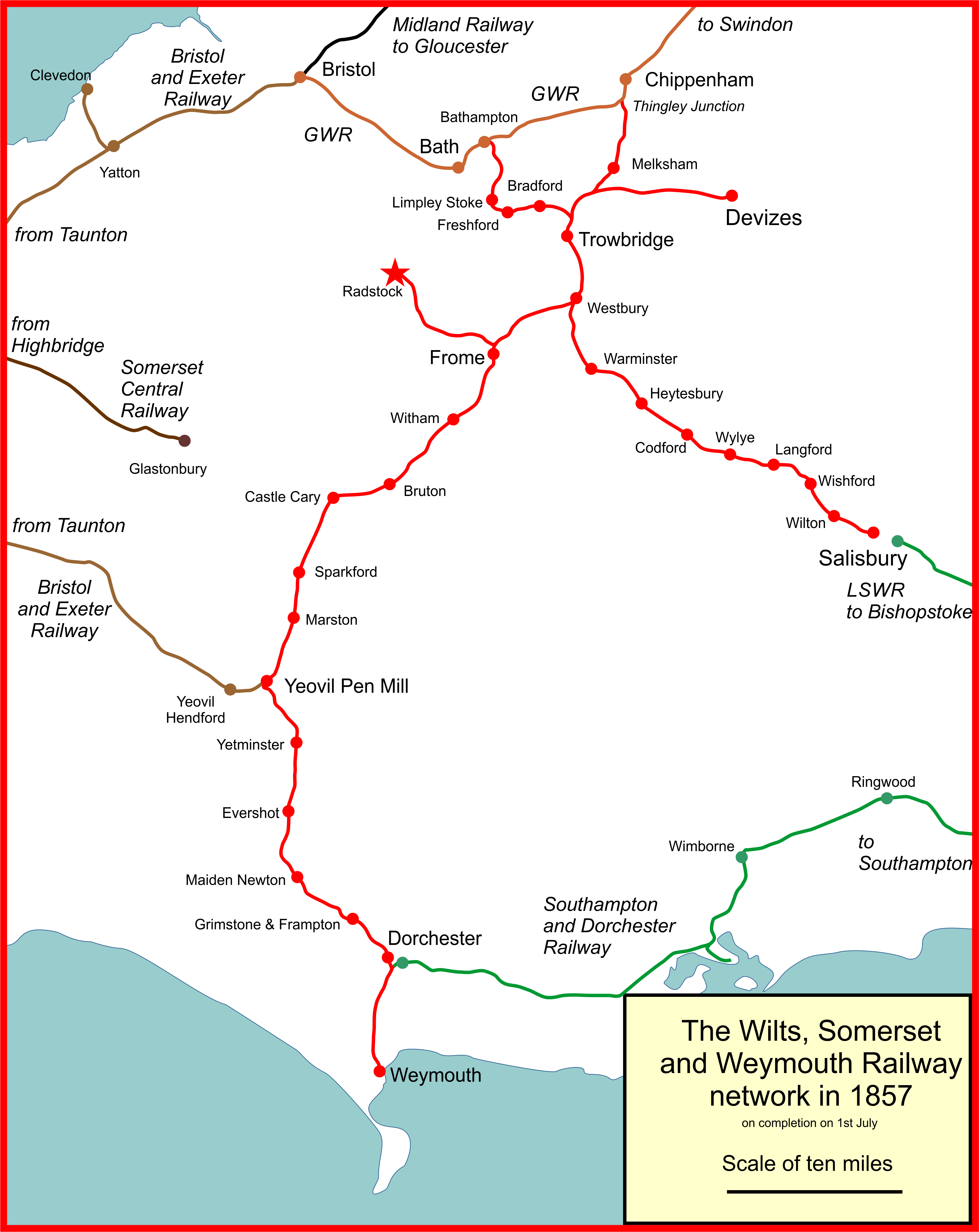
WS&WR lines in 1857

Wilts, Somerset and Weymouth Railway Act 1845
- Act of Parliament
- Parliament of the United Kingdom
- Long title: An Act for making a Railway from the Great Western Railway to the City of Salisbury and Town of Weymouth, with other Railways in connexion therewith, to be called "The Wilts, Somerset, and Weymouth Railway."
- Citation: 8 & 9 Vict. c. liii

Dates
- Royal assent: 30 June 1845

Wilts, Somerset and Weymouth Railway (Amendment) Act 1846
- Act of Parliament
- Parliament of the United Kingdom
- Long title: An Act to authorise certain Alterations and Extensions of the line of the Wilts, Somerset, and Weymouth Railway.
- Citation: 9 & 10 Vict. c. cccxiii

Dates
- Royal assent: 3 August 1846

The Wilts, Somerset and Weymouth Railway obtained its authorising act of Parliament, the Wilts, Somerset and Weymouth Railway Act 1845 (8 & 9 Vict. c. liii), on 30 June 1845. It was to be on the same broad gauge as the GWR network, and to run from near Chippenham to Salisbury, with branches to Weymouth, Dorset, Sherborne, Devizes and Bradford-on-Avon, and a coal branch to Radstock. In the same session, authorising acts were passed for the Berks and Hants Railway (Reading to Hungerford and Basingstoke, sponsored by the GWR) and the Taunton to Yeovil branch of the B&ER.

The routes of the line had been designed in some haste, and after passage of the act a number of modifications were decided upon; the initially planned GWR route for connecting Bath to the WS&WR had been from the Radstock branch to Twerton, west of Bath, but on 7 October 1845 Isambard Kingdom Brunel, engineer to the GWR and the WS&WR, reported that a better route was through the Avon valley from Bradford to Bathampton, east of Bath. The course of the WS&WR between Frome and Bruton was modified to make it more suited to main line running; this change, and an extension to the quay at Weymouth, were authorised by the Wilts, Somerset and Weymouth Railway (Amendment) Act 1846 (9 & 10 Vict. c. cccxiii) of 3 August 1846. Next, insurmountable difficulties were discovered over the hilly route between Dorchester and Weymouth, and a major deviation was needed there; this had to be authorised in the 1847 parliamentary session, by the Wilts, Somerset and Weymouth Railway Deviation Act 1847 (10 & 11 Vict. c. lx) passed on 25 June 1847, so that much time had been lost before construction could start there.

By now the Southampton and Dorchester Railway, friendly to the LSWR, had reached Dorchester (on 1 June 1847). The line had been independently promoted, and it had wooed both the GWR and the LSWR at times, and its loss to the narrow gauge camp was a blow to the GWR. That company had always intended that the WS&WR should be part of a through main line to Exeter, and was now considering how that might be created; as its construction would put the friendly B&ER at a disadvantage, the GWR proposed purchasing the B&ER, an offer that was rejected. The GWR now actively planned its line to the west: it would infill the Hungerford (Berks and Hants) to Devizes (WS&WR) section, and build a new line from Yeovil (WS&WR) to Exeter via Axminster. This latter line was not built by the GWR, (Note: An almost identical route from Yeovil to Exeter was later built by the LSWR.) but its development as a scheme provoked renewed hostility from the LSWR camp, and also opposition from the otherwise friendly B&ER.

== First sections: Westbury ==
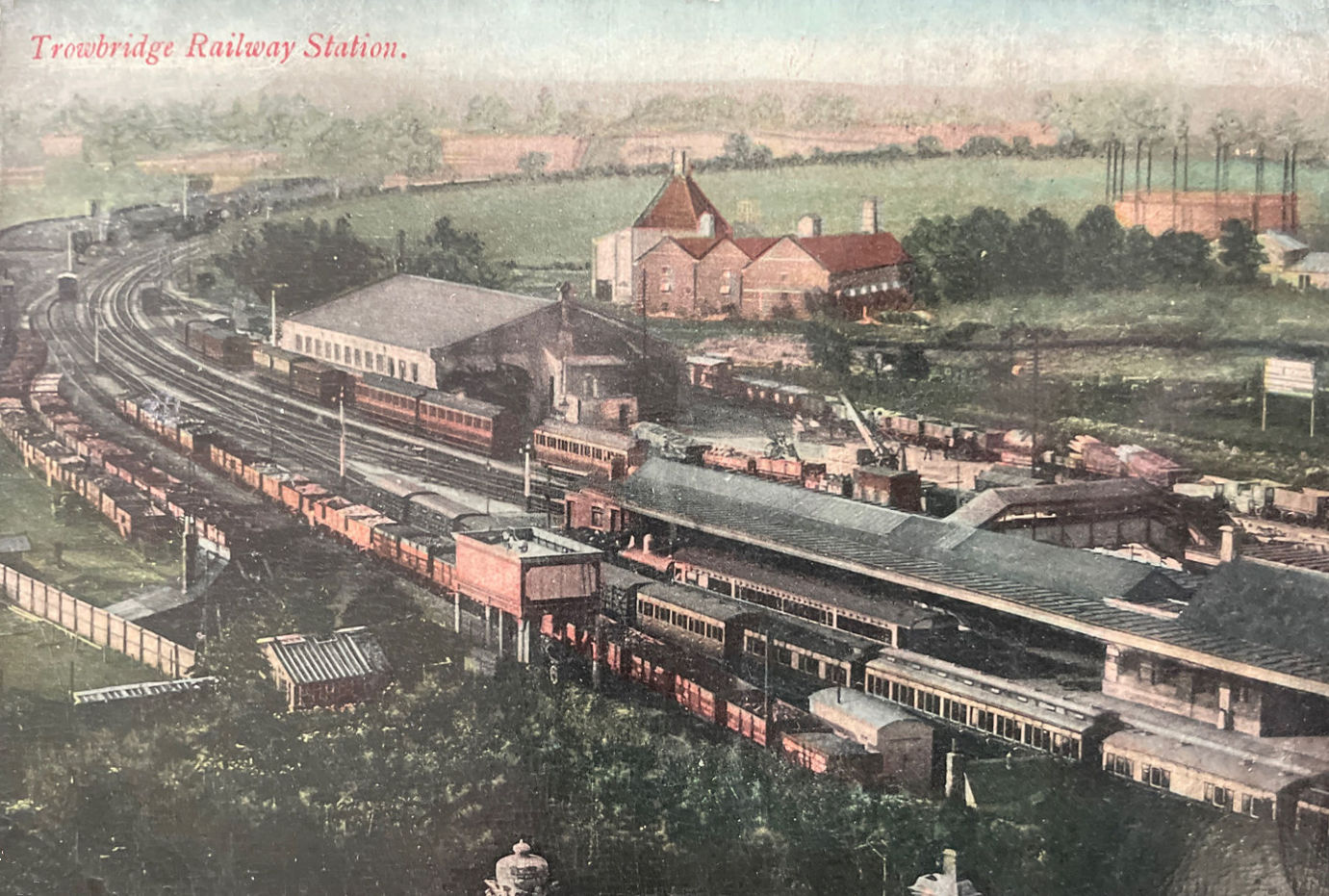
Trowbridge station in 1908

Starting from the junction at Thingley, a couple of miles southwest of Chippenham, the line was constructed via Melksham and Trowbridge as far as Westbury. It was inspected by the Board of Trade inspector on 26 August 1848 and approved for opening. After a trial trip for the directors on 2 September, this section was opened to the public on 5 September 1848. At this date, before the introduction of interlocking signalling, facing junctions on the main line were regarded as potentially dangerous, and therefore the junction at Thingley was laid out so that trains reversed into a siding before continuing on the Westbury line.

At the same time the spur from Staverton, north of Trowbridge, to Bradford-on-Avon was physically completed, but rails were not laid and it was not presented for opening, so it lay unused for the time being. (Note: There are complexities about the Bradford triangle. MacDermot (volume I part 1 page 286) says in connection with the first opening, "The short branch from Staverton to Bradford was made, and even the Bradford station built, but for some reason the rails were left unfinished, and no attempt was made to open it. So matters remained for some years to the extreme discontent of the inhabitants." Staverton to Bradford is clearly the north curve, although of course only the trackbed was made at this time and no actual track; the main line was open. Phillips (page 14) also says "from Staverton". Later, discussing the opening from Trowbridge to Bathampton on page 414, MacDermot says "As far as Bradford, with the tunnel (159 yards) and even the station there, it had been practically ready, save for part of the permanent way, as we have seen. It left the main Wilts and Somerset line about 1 1/4 miles north of Trowbridge by a fork, on the southern branch only of which the rails were laid [and ran on to Bathampton]." He annotates a footnote against the word "laid", which reads "The northern curve was not used till March 1895." MacDermot's "southern branch" of the fork is clearly the original main line. All this appears to mean that Bradford was originally intended to be served by the north curve only, allowing direct running from Chippenham to Bradford. When the Trowbridge to Bathampton line was built, it had been decided to omit the north curve, so that Bathampton had direct running from Trowbridge but not from Chippenham via Holt.)

== Sale to the GWR ==
In this period, actually obtaining money that had been subscribed was proving exceptionally difficult, and the company was unable to fund continuing construction work. Only the large, established railway companies with an actual income could raise money, and as the pressure increased, the directors realised that the only way forward was to sell their line to the GWR. That decision was taken by them in October 1849, and the transfer took place on 14 March 1850; it was confirmed by the Great Western Railway Act 1851 (14 & 15 Vict. c. xlviii) on 3 July 1851, which dissolved the Wilts, Somerset and Weymouth Railway Company.

=== Frome and Warminster ===
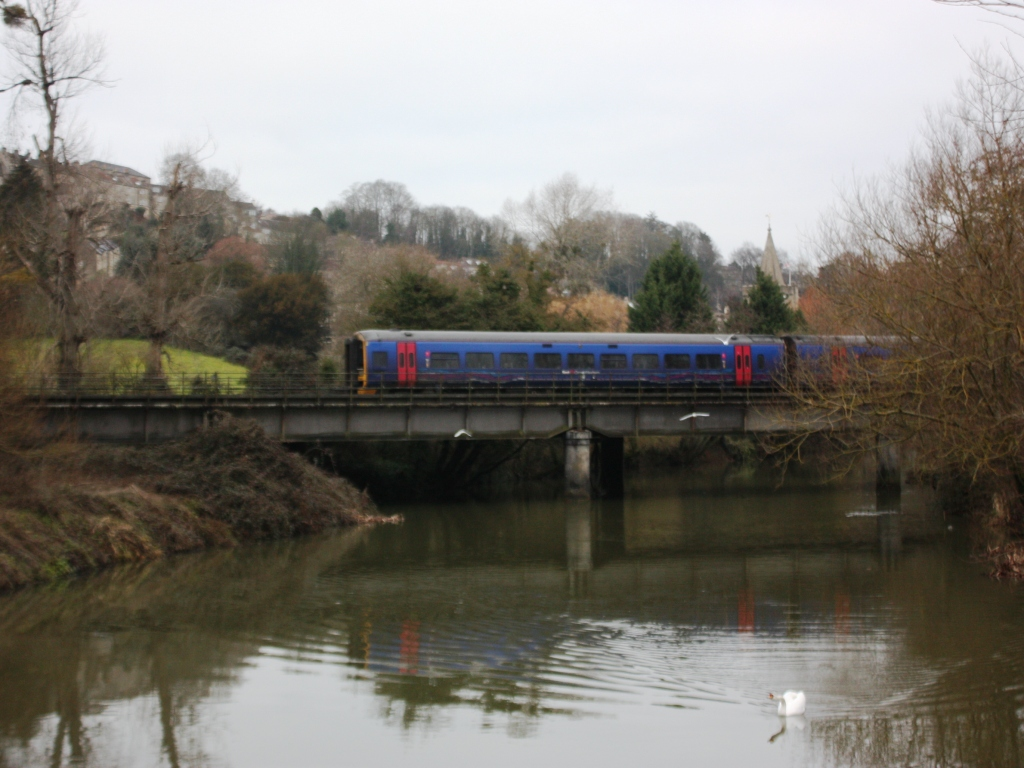
A modern train at Bradford-on-Avon

Money was difficult to find even for the GWR, and attention was given to reaching places that might bring in extra traffic without great expenditure in getting there. Frome, on the edge of the Somerset coalfield, was such a place, and the line was built there from Westbury. Captain R. W. Lufman of the Board of Trade inspected the section from Westbury to Frome, and approved it, and it opened to the public on 7 October 1850. Warminster, a thriving market town on the future Salisbury line, was also an objective, and the section from Westbury opened on 9 September 1851. The branch line from Frome to Radstock, centre then of the Somerset coalfield, was started too, but then difficulties with getting possession of the necessary land delayed things so much that the branch was put in abeyance.

Frome, Yeovil and Weymouth Railway Act 1852
- Act of Parliament
- Parliament of the United Kingdom
- Long title: An Act for incorporating and giving Powers to the Frome, Yeovil, and Weymouth Railway Company, and for other Purposes.
- Citation: 15 & 16 Vict. c. cxxv

Dates
- Royal assent: 30 June 1852

Text of statute as originally enacted

To generate much-needed capital to complete the line, the GWR created a Frome, Yeovil and Weymouth Railway Company which was authorised by an act of Parliament, the Frome, Yeovil and Weymouth Railway Act 1852 (15 & 16 Vict. c. cxxv) of 30 June 1852 to complete that route: its capital was to be £550,000 with borrowing powers of £183,000. The intention evidently was to arouse local interest—and money—but the latter was not forthcoming and the company was dissolved without achieving anything.

=== Mandamus ===
The railway was now open from Thingley Junction, Chippenham, to Frome and Warminster. The authorised spur to Bradford-on-Avon had been built in 1848, before the sale to the GWR, but for reasons that are not clear, this section was not opened; Devizes was to have a branch from the time of the original Wilts, Somerset and Weymouth Railway (Amendment) Act 1846 (9 & 10 Vict. c. cccxiii). Also, before the sale of the WS&WR, the GWR had undertaken to build a line from Bradford to Bath. The citizens of Bradford and Devizes now observed the rival towns of Trowbridge and Frome benefiting from their new rail connection, while they languished without an active railway. Matters escalated until they applied for a writ of mandamus, to compel opening to their towns. The GWR was able to state honestly that shortage of money was a problem and could not simply be overcome. Devizes lost, but the writ for Bradford was made absolute at the end of 1852, obliging the GWR to complete to Bathampton through Bradford, and forbidding payment of dividends after two years until they did so. (In fact the construction proved so difficult that the GWR applied for, and obtained, an extension of time beyond the two years.)

== 1854: completion to Salisbury, Weymouth, Bathampton and Devizes ==
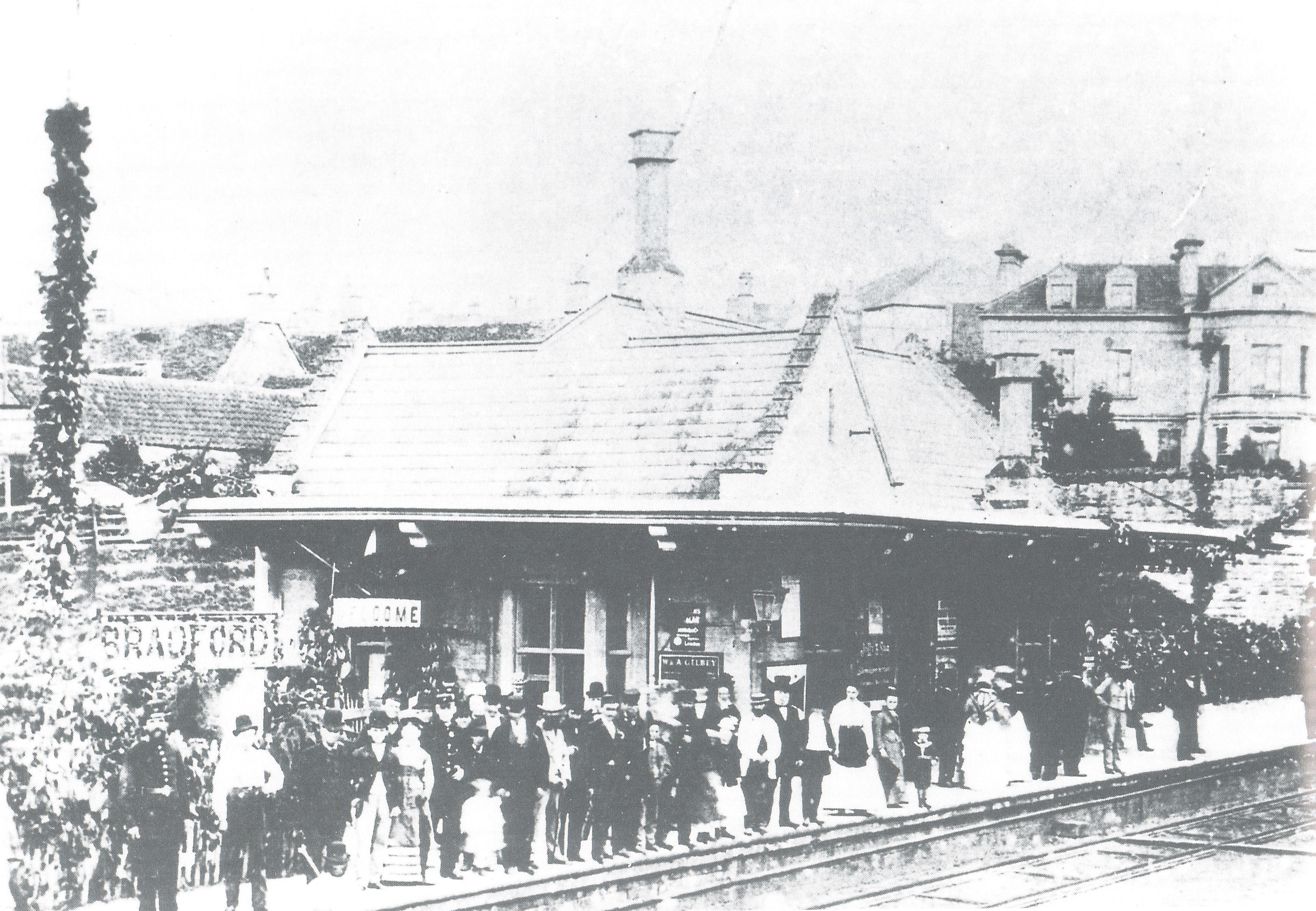
Bradford on Avon station in 1897

Momentum had been lost—but a lot of money spent—since the original passage of the Wilts, Somerset and Weymouth Railway (Amendment) Act 1846 (9 & 10 Vict. c. cccxiii), but there was no alternative to pressing on: the LSWR now had Weymouth in its sights via the Southampton and Dorchester Railway, and it was important to the GWR to secure primacy there. The long onward route from Frome to Weymouth now seemed unattractive. In anticipation of the arrival of railways in their town, the Borough of Weymouth changed from local solar time to railway time on 1 January 1852, a move that was rather premature. At last the mineral branch from Frome to Radstock, just over 8 miles long, was opened on 14 November 1854.

The 19 1/2 miles (31 km) of the Salisbury branch from Warminster was at last opened on 30 June 1856, to a new terminus at Fisherton Street. At this time the LSWR was still using its Milford terminus, on the other edge of the city. The original impetus for a Salisbury line was access to Southampton over the LSWR, but relations with that company were no longer amicable.

Frome to Yeovil opened on 1 September 1856, and Colonel Yolland inspected the Yeovil to Weymouth section on 15 January 1857. There was a sharp curve connecting the LSWR to the WS&WR line at Dorchester, as the LSWR station had not been aligned for making this connection; Yolland required that LSWR trains on the connecting curve be restricted to 6 mph (10 km/h) and carry a travelling porter. The line to Weymouth opened 20 January 1857; all these lines were single track, broad gauge, except that double track mixed gauge was provided from Dorchester to Weymouth for the use of LSWR trains, and the Dorchester curve was mixed gauge. The GWR had been forced to agree to lay rails for narrow gauge trains, and the LSWR could be charged 60% of gross receipts over that section. To ensure a strange sort of equity, the Board of Trade required that the LSWR should lay mixed gauge on its line for the same distance, about 8 miles (13 km), eastward from Dorchester, ending "abruptly in mid-country" near Wool. That cost the LSWR £16,309, and it is likely that the broad gauge rail was never used.

The Bristol and Exeter Railway had opened its line to Yeovil (from Taunton) on 1 October 1853, but its station was at Hendford, on the west side of the town; on 2 February 1857 they opened a connecting line from Hendford to the WS&WR Yeovil station.

The GWR pressed ahead with the Bradford to Bathampton section; forming the line under Dundas Aqueduct for the Kennet and Avon Canal proved particularly difficult. Yolland visited for an inspection on 16 January 1857. He found numerous shortcomings with the track, signalling and buildings and he refused opening. However he reinspected a fortnight later, and the faults had evidently been rectified, for he approved the opening: it took place on 2 February 1857. It was a single broad-gauge track, laid on transverse sleepers, apparently adopted by Brunel as an experiment. This section joined the original WS&WR main line at Bradford Junction, a little north of Trowbridge; Bradford itself was north of Bradford Junction, that is, on the new section of route.

Finally, on 1 July 1857 the Devizes branch was opened, from Holt, north of Trowbridge. The Wilts, Somerset and Weymouth network was complete at last.

== Branch connections ==
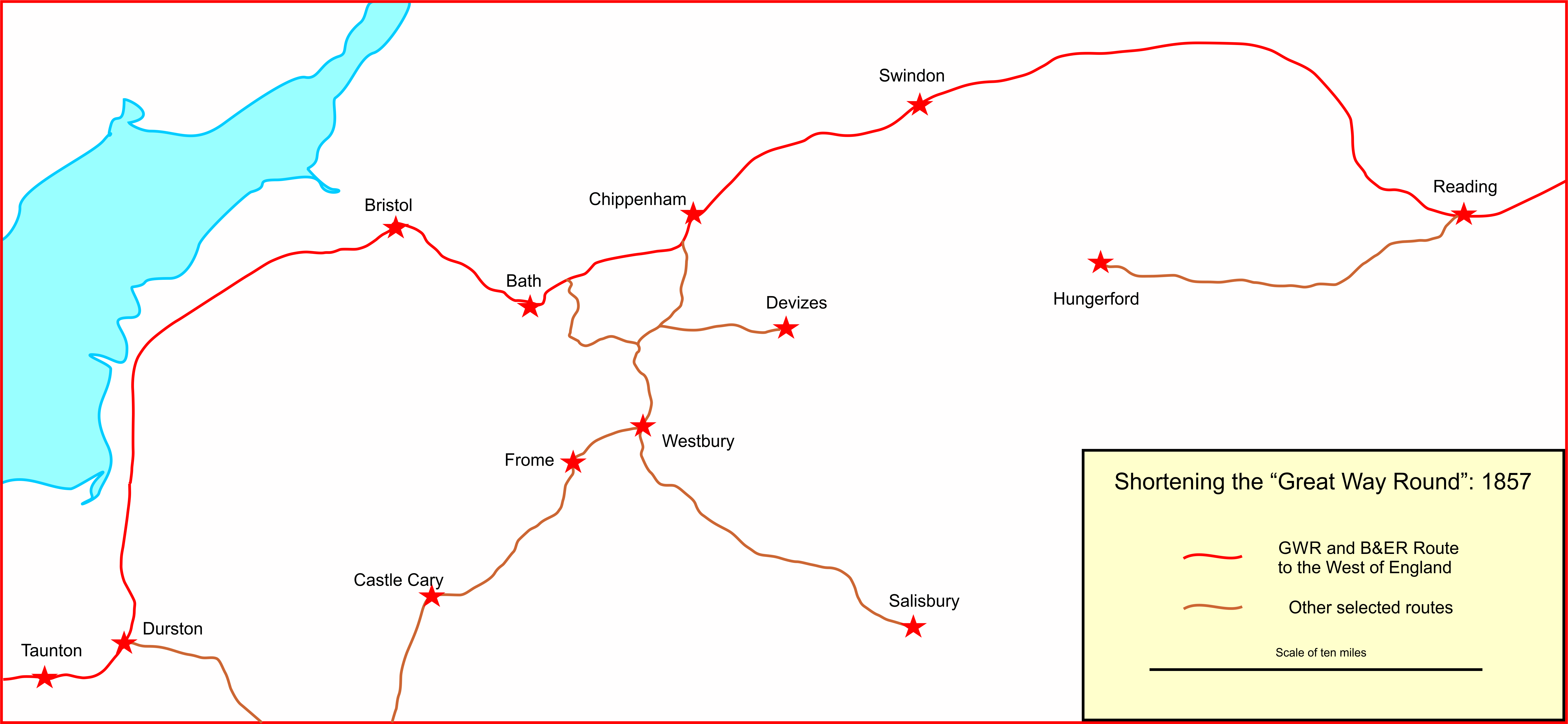
The Great Way Round to the West of England in 1857

From the completion of the core network in 1857, a number of independent branches and other lines made connection.

The first was the Bridport Railway, a branch line from Maiden Newton to Bridport, which opened 12 November 1857. Bridport was an important town, and had been on a number of projected main lines, but none of those came to being, and the town had to content itself with a branch line connection. The branch was worked by the GWR.

The following year Shepton Mallet gained its railway connection: the East Somerset Railway opened its line from Witham on 9 November 1858. This was extended to Wells on 1 March 1862. Eventually this branch was able to connect through to Yatton at the beginning of 1878.

The Wilts, Somerset and Weymouth Railway (Amendment) Act 1846 (9 & 10 Vict. c. cccxiii) had included powers to connect to the harbour at Weymouth, but any such branch extension was forgotten. A local company, the Weymouth and Portland Railway was authorised to build a branch onto the Isle of Portland, with a street tramway from Weymouth station to the Channel Islands quay. The line was opened on 18 October 1865; locomotives were prohibited on the tramway to the quay, and horse traction was used; the line was leased jointly to the LSWR and the GWR.

The standard-gauge Salisbury and Yeovil Railway opened to Yeovil on 1 June 1860; although this was an independent company, the line was part of the LSWR's strategy of reaching the West of England, and on 19 July 1860 the LSWR continuation from Yeovil towards Exeter opened. The GWR built a branch from near their Yeovil station to a goods exchange station at Clifton Maybank, near the LSWR Yeovil Junction station. The exchange station, called Clifton Maybank, was needed because of the gauge difference: goods had to be shifted from wagons of one gauge to wagons of the other. It opened on 13 June 1864.

== Gauge conversion and double track ==
The Wilts, Somerset and Weymouth Railway had been built to be part of the Great Western Railway system, and as such used broad-gauge track. In 1874 the GWR decided that it was time to convert to what had become the standard gauge, and the whole of the WS&WR system were converted in a massive operation in June 1874. On 18 June the network was cleared of broad gauge rolling stock and the work of altering the gauge began, and the first standard gauge train ran on 22 June.

The Radstock branch, built as a mineral railway, could now connect directly with its northerly neighbour, the narrow gauge Bristol and North Somerset Railway, which had reached Radstock in 1873. It too had seen coal traffic as it main purpose, but it was a passenger railway too. Now that the break of gauge had been eliminated (by the conversion of the Frome to Radstock branch), the two lines could be worked together, and a passenger service was started from Frome. The original mineral line had a junction from the Westbury junction, diverging before reaching the Frome station, so a west-to-north curve was laid in, and when it was ready, passenger trains operated from Frome to Bristol via Radstock from 5 July 1875.

The line between Thingley Junction and Frome was already double track, and the Yeovil Pen Mill to Evershot section had been doubled in 1858, but the rest was single. The Dorchester to Weymouth section was already mixed gauge, for the LSWR trains.

After the gauge conversion, more sections were provided with double track: Frome to Witham in spring 1875; Witham to Castle Cary in 1880; Castle Cary to Yeovil Pen Mill in 1881; Evershot to Maiden Newton in 1882; Maiden Newton to Grimstone in 1884; and Grimstone to Dorchester in 1885. The Bathampton to Bradford section was doubled on 17 May 1885.

== Abbotsbury branch connects ==
The Abbotsbury Railway finally succeeded in opening its line after serious delays and difficulties, on 9 November 1885. The company prospectus had promised extensive mineral deposits, and a possible extension to Exeter along the coast. These riches never materialised and the line simply ran from Upwey Junction to Abbotsbury. It was worked by the GWR.

== Bradford north curve ==
In 1895 the north curve at Bradford Junction was opened, allowing through running from the Limpley Stoke direction towards Melksham. Exceptionally severe frost had caused damage to the lining of Box Tunnel and the extensive repair work necessitated the night-time and Sunday diversion of London–Bristol trains, involving reversal at Westbury or Trowbridge. The new curve was hastily laid in on the earthworks of the original 1857 Devizes branch, and it opened on 11 March 1895.

== The Westbury route to Exeter ==
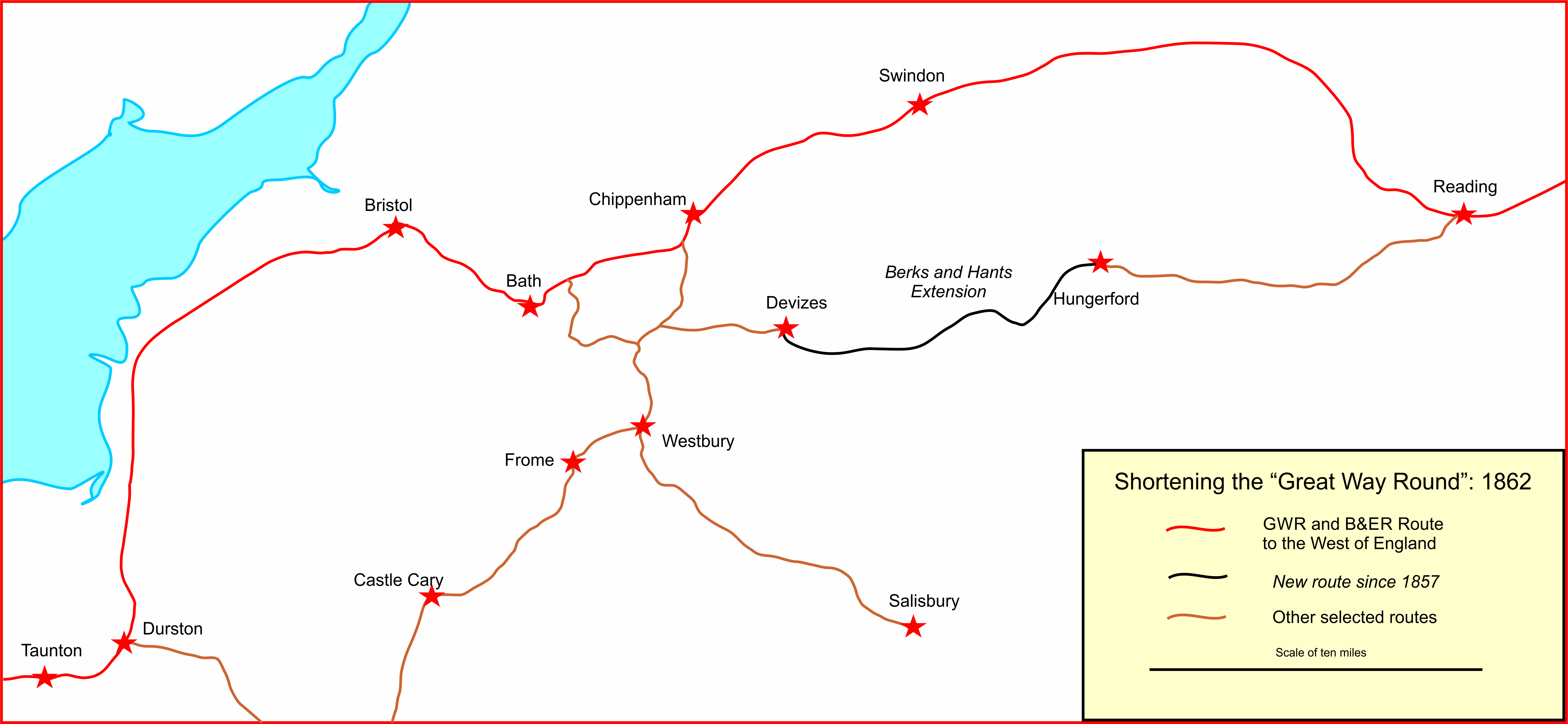
The Great Way Round in 1862

The GWR, the Bristol and Exeter Railway and the South Devon Railway had long since amalgamated, and there was an important through route from London Paddington to Taunton, Exeter and Plymouth. However the route was not direct: it ran via Bristol Temple Meads station, and the GWR was sometimes called the great way round. The LSWR had a significantly shorter route from London Waterloo to Exeter via Salisbury. The GWR had a line from Reading to Devizes, joining with the WS&WR lines there, and it was clear that filling in some gaps would create a coherent direct route between Reading and Taunton. The GWR had more than once obtained legal powers in acts of Parliament to build such lines but they had lapsed, when in 1895 the directors took the decision to start work.

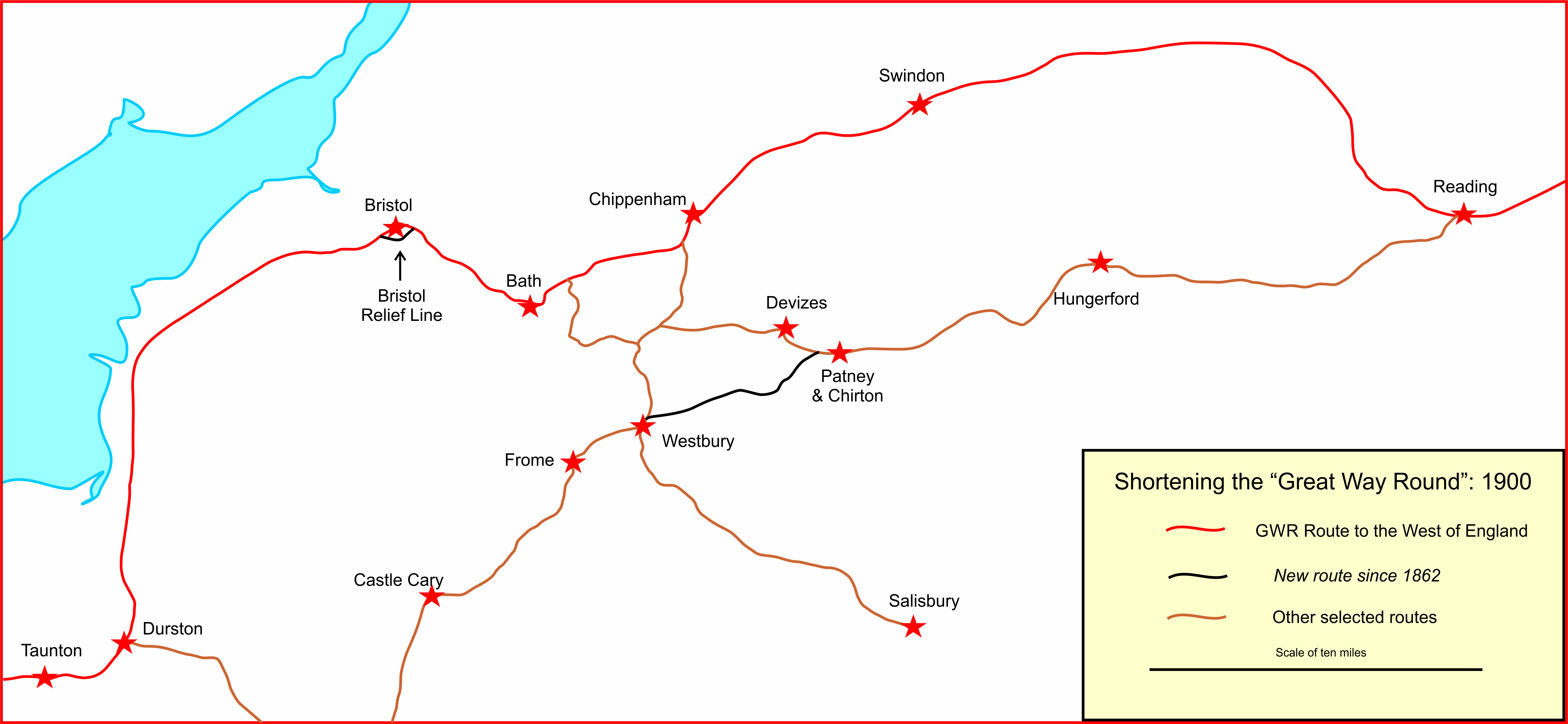
The first short-cut: 1900

This was to be a trunk main line, and the first task was to double the line east of Patney, which had been built as the Berks and Hants Extension Railway, and to build a new line from Patney to meet the WS&WR line at Westbury, the Stert and Westbury cut-off. This was started in 1895, and goods traffic first ran on the route on 29 July 1900, followed by local passenger trains on 1 October. This shortened the distance from Paddington to Westbury, and therefore to Yeovil and Weymouth, by over 14 miles (23 km). As part of the work, Westbury station was much extended, as its status as a junction station becoming more important.

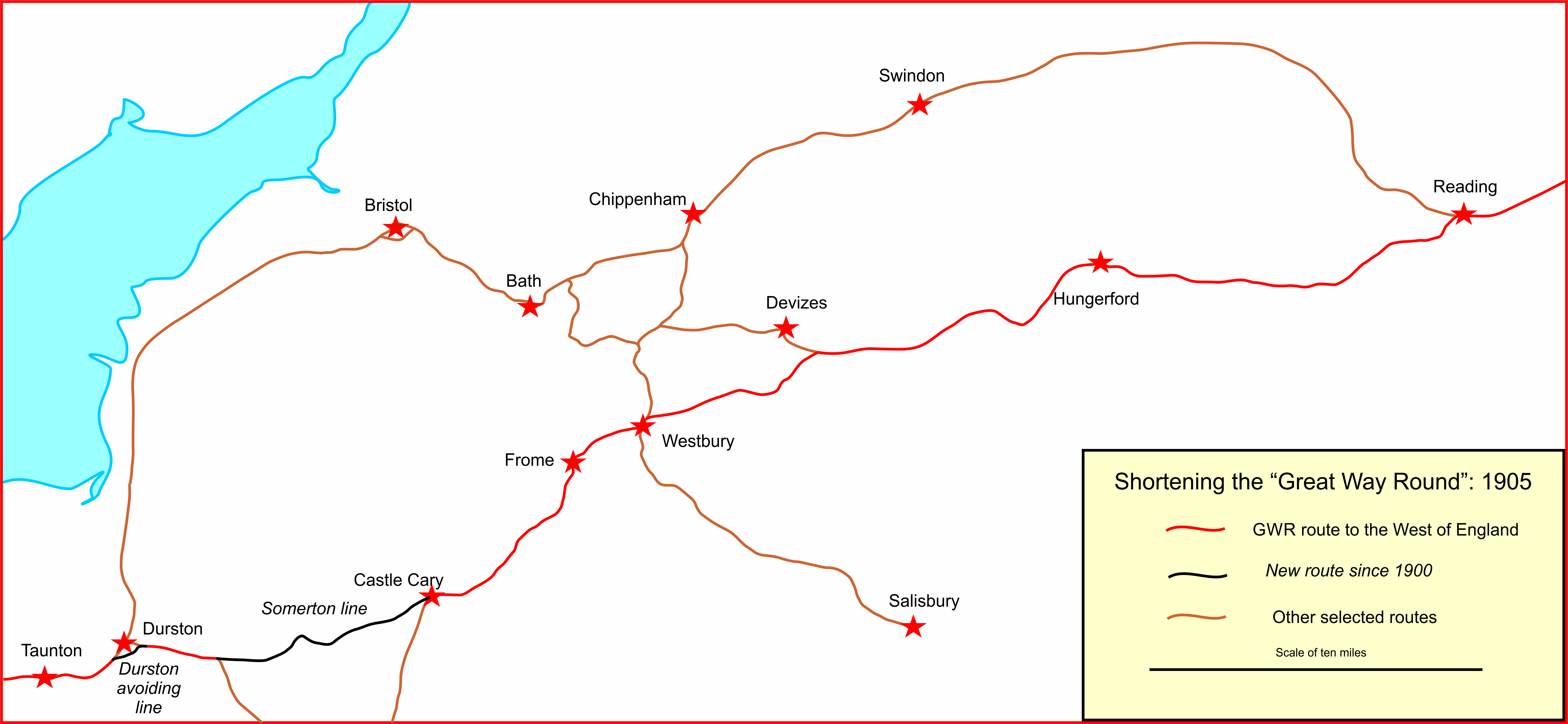
Reading to Taunton in 1905

The next phase of work was to construct the Langport cut-off, which ran west from Castle Cary to join the Bristol and Exeter line northeast of Taunton. This was opened in stages: it was opened from Castle Cary to Charlton Mackrell on 1 July 1905. On 2 April 1906 part of the line was opened at the western end, from a new junction at Cogload, near Taunton, to Somerton. Finally the central section, and the entire route was opened on 20 May 1906. It followed part of a branch line from Yeovil towards Taunton; the relevant section was upgraded to double track main line standards, and in an area where persistent flooding problems had been experienced, it was elevated to avoid the difficulty. From 2 July 1906 express trains and other through traffic was diverted on to the new line. The cut-off route saved a further 20 miles (32 km) compared with the former route.

== Other twentieth-century developments ==
=== Railmotors ===
The GWR was anxious to develop local passenger traffic; the early distribution of stations was somewhat sparse. Local requests prompted the GWR to provide a station at Upwey, on the Dorchester to Weymouth section; it opened on 21 June 1871. When the Abbotsbury branch opened in 1885, its junction was south of Upwey and faced Weymouth; on 19 April 1886 an Upwey Junction station was opened to serve it, and the earlier Upwey station was closed.

In 1905 the GWR introduced its steam railmotors as a response to the rising threat of motor bus competition. These were single passenger coaches incorporating a small steam locomotive within the body at one end; cheaper than a full locomotive, they saved time at terminals by not needing to run round. They were equipped with retractable steps and were able to make calls at places with no platform, or only a very low one. They were operated between Dorchester and Weymouth, and new halts were opened for them at Upwey Wishing Well, Came Bridge and Radipole. Upwey Wishing Well was opened on 28 May 1905, and the other two on 1 July 1905. Came Bridge was renamed Monkton and Came Bridge (Golf Links) Halt on 1 October 1905.

In the same year a similar railmotor service was started between Chippenham and Trowbridge, with new halts at Lacock, Beanacre, Broughton Gifford and Staverton.

=== Limpley Stoke ===
In 1910 the siding accommodation at Limpley Stoke was much enlarged to handle mineral traffic coming from the Camerton line; it was remarshalled there for onward transit.

=== Military facilities ===
Britain had been involved for some time in hostilities in South Africa, and in October 1899 the Second Boer War flared up. The War Office increased the training facilities on Salisbury Plain, in many places alongside the Salisbury line. After the Boer War was settled, tension in Europe developed, leading to the First World War, and special facilities were provided on the line: additional siding accommodation was needed and goods loops, as well as branch lines from Heytesbury to Sutton Veny Camp, and from Codford to Codford Camp. Most of these facilities were removed at the end of the war.

=== More halts ===
The railmotors were successful, but they had the limitation that they were unable to cope with peaks of traffic, or to run longer distances, and by 1922 the fleet was substantially reduced, and many were withdrawn in 1935. There was a continuing need to respond to local passenger traffic, heightened as improved roads made motor buses more efficient, and in the 1930s a number of halts were opened south of Yeovil, and also Strap Lane Halt near Bruton.

=== Avoiding lines ===
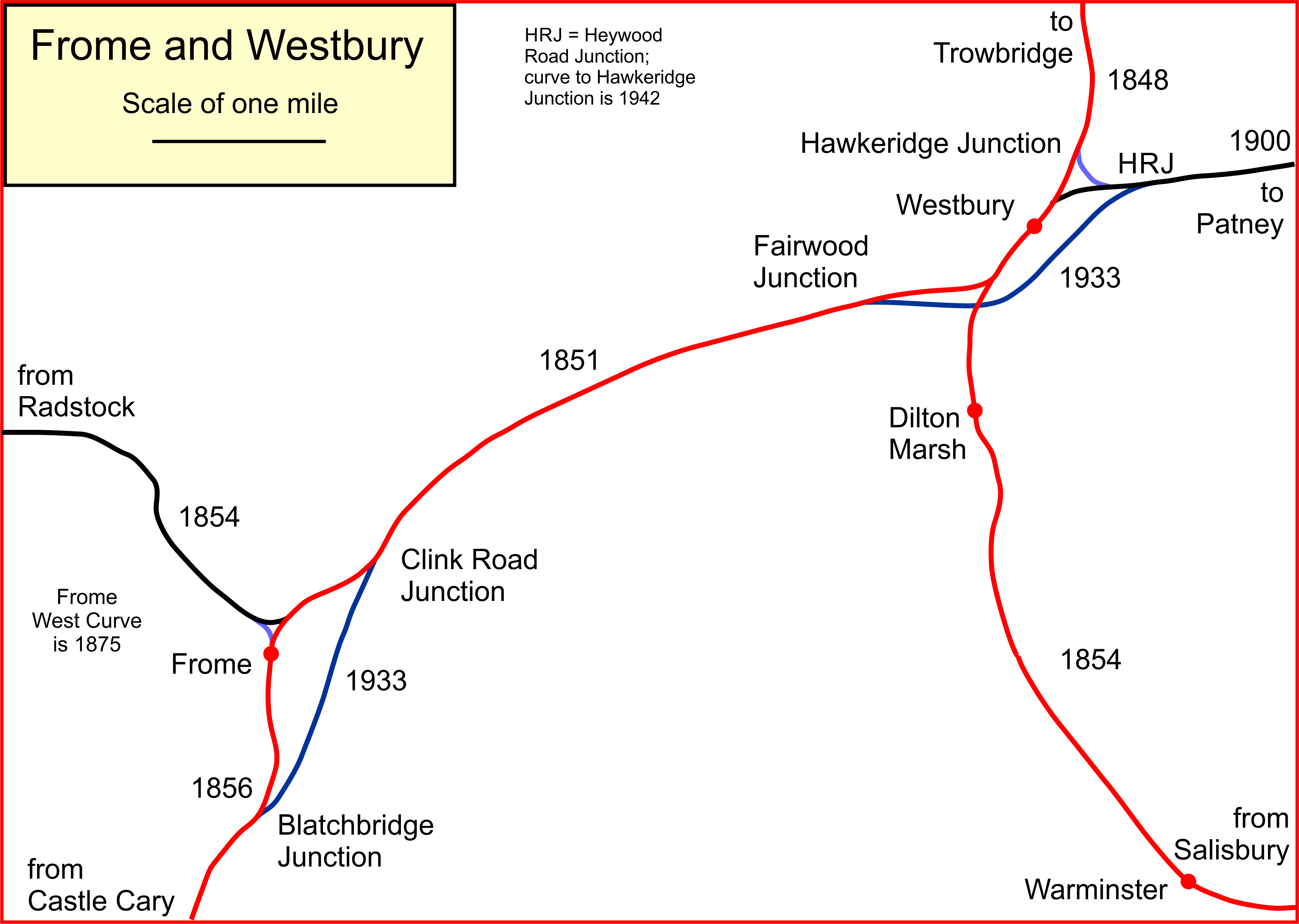
Westbury and Frome avoiding lines

When the cut-off line, from Reading to Taunton via Westbury, was opened, it ran through Westbury and Frome stations. Westbury was not originally aligned for an east–west main line, and Frome station was on an awkward curve; there was a 30 mph (48 km/h) speed restriction at both places for West of England and Weymouth trains, and at Westbury they conflicted with the heavy coal traffic from the Trowbridge line towards Salisbury. The Developments (Loan Guarantees and Grants) Act 1929 was passed to stimulate employment and to encourage industrial development, and the GWR obtained financial assistance from this source to build avoiding lines, bypassing the two stations.

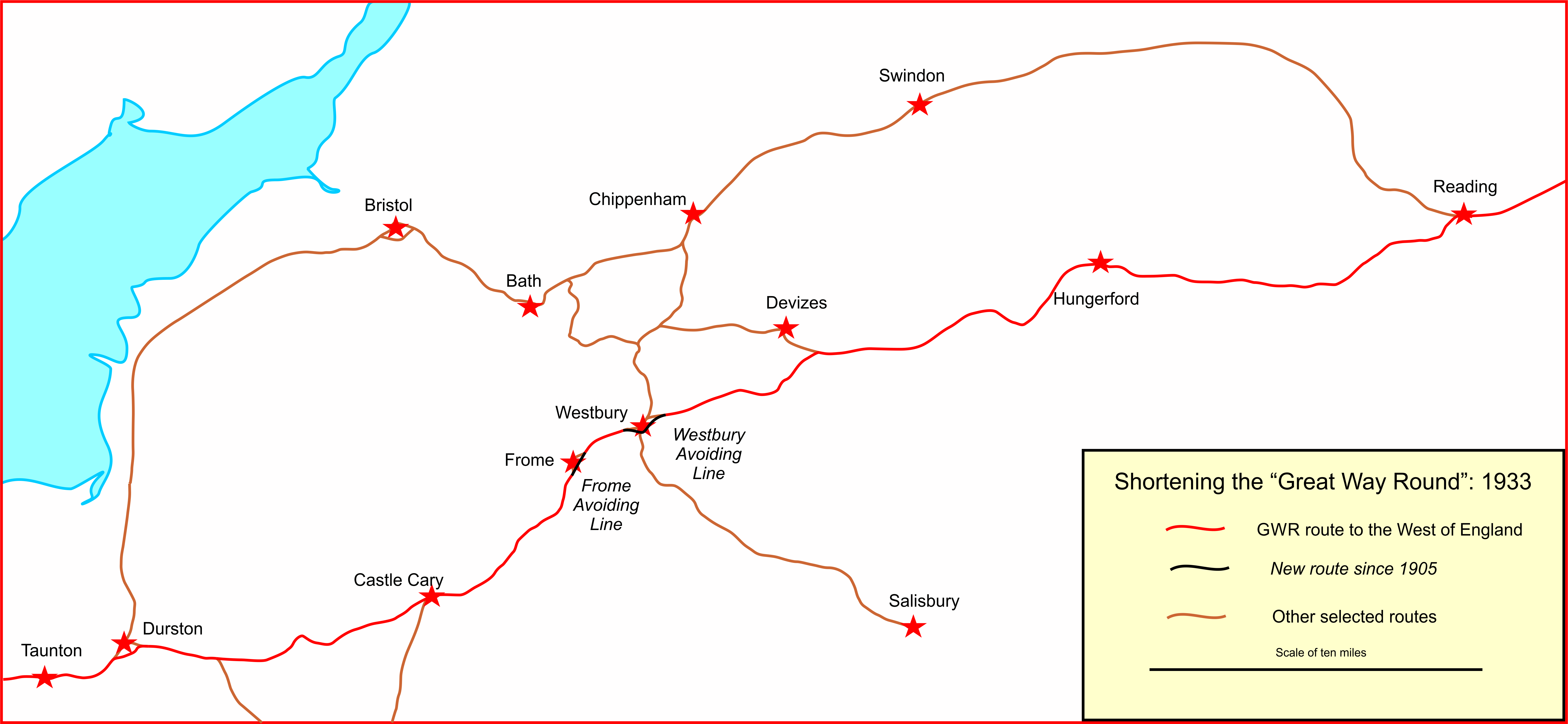
Reading to Taunton: short cuts complete in 1933

Logan and Hemingway of Doncaster were the contractor, and the cost of the works was to be £220,000. The avoiding lines were opened to goods traffic on 1 January 1933, and for all traffic at the beginning of the summer timetable period in 1933.

=== War again ===
In 1939 the country was at war again: the Second World War had started. Again the Salisbury line especially received heavy military traffic, and many of the special facilities removed after 1919 were reinstated. In the middle and later years of this war bombing of British towns became widespread, and severing of a railway line caused major disruption to the war effort. Many connections between formerly competing railways were laid in to facilitate routing round blockages. The Clifton Maybank branch at Yeovil had closed in 1937 but its trackbed ran adjacent to the Southern Railway (Note: In 1923 the Southern Railway had absorbed the LSWR.) and a connection was made enabling trains to run from Castle Cary towards Exeter on the Southern railway line; it opened on 13 October 1943, with considerable assistance from Canadian troops.

Extensive sidings were installed at Lacock for the Air Ministry, and a west curve was made at Thingley Junction. The formation had been made as part of the construction of the original main line of the WS&WR, and if it had been opened it would have allowed through running from Bath to Trowbridge. It was overtaken by the GWR commitment to build the line via Limpley Stoke. The Thingley curve opened in 1942 and was informally referred to as The Air Ministry Loop. It was removed in July 1959, (Note: Cobb says 1955.) but the Lacock Sidings remained until 1964.

== Nationalisation ==
The Transport Act 1947 was passed after the end of the war and the main line railways of the country became part of the state-owned British Railways from the start of 1948.

The usage of rural stations and branch lines continued to decline, and on 19 September 1955 all the stations between Warminster and Salisbury were closed.

On 2 November 1959 the passenger service on the Frome to Radstock line was ended, and with the decline of the Somerset coalfield the branch became fully closed from April 1966, except for a connection to Whatley Quarry, which connected by a private siding near Hapsford. With the increase in road building in the 1960s this quarry's output became increasingly important at that time. Remaining coal extraction in the area was further north and the rail connection was to Bristol over the Bristol and North Somerset line. However, in the summer of 1968 the embankment north of Pensford was washed out and the line was severed. It was considered to be uneconomic to repair it, and the Frome connection was reopened, the traffic from the area being brought out via Radstock and Westbury to Bristol. However the remaining pits closed in 1973 and the final coal movement took place on 16 November 1973.

In the 1960s the financial losses of the railway network escalated, and in 1963 a report was published, The Reshaping of British Railways. This proposed large scale closures of little-used lines and stations, and the resulting changes were called the Beeching cuts, after the author, Richard Beeching, chairman of British Railways. This affected many of the branches connecting to the WS&WR network, and in 1966 the Devizes branch, and many intermediate halts and small stations on the WS&WR lines closed too. General freight traffic to Weymouth was mostly diverted to the Bournemouth route, and in 1967–1968 singling was undertaken of the routes between Thingley Junction and Bradford Junction, and between Castle Cary and Dorchester.

The main route from London to Weymouth was now from Waterloo via Bournemouth and Dorchester South; from London to Bournemouth was electrified in 1967, with the trains running on with diesel haulage to Weymouth. The electrification, on the third rail direct current system, was extended to Weymouth from 10 February 1988.

On 17 March 1990 the north curve at Bradford was removed; it had been retained in latter years to handle diverted trains during engineering closure of the Box line, but the elimination of locomotive-hauled passenger trains meant that diverted trains could simply reverse at Bradford south junction.

The Bath–Westbury–Salisbury part of the network received an enhanced passenger train service with the introduction of the Sprinter diesel units, giving a generally hourly service on a Bristol–Salisbury–Portsmouth axis. The service over the Thingley to Bradford section was much reduced, and the Westbury to Weymouth section had a basic service.

== Train services ==
=== Passenger trains ===
When the first line opened from Thingley Junction to Westbury, there were five passenger trains each way; they made more or less reasonable connections with London trains.

By 1895 the service had increased a little in number, with some omitting certain stops; there were through trains from Chippenham to Weymouth. The opening of Bradford north curve in that year enabled through services from Devizes to Bath; in fact many of these ran from Reading to Bath or Bristol, and there was a fast morning up service and evening down; there were six daily trains on the Radstock line, all running through to Bristol via Clutton.

In July 1904 the GWR started running fast trains to Plymouth, running non-stop from Paddington to Plymouth, but this was via the Bristol Relief Line (Note: The Bristol Relief Line bypassed Bristol Temple Meads between North Somerset Junction and Pylle Hill via Marsh Junction and St Philips Marsh.) The best trains were strictly limited to seven vehicles, and became known as The Limited, although later named The Cornish Riviera Express. On 23 July 1906 (down) and 25 July (up) these trains were diverted to run over the new cut-off line via Lavington, Frome and Somerton, now running non-stop over a distance of 225 miles 57 chains (363.25 km). The down train left Paddington at 10:30, and slipped a coach at Westbury for Weymouth, and at Exeter. The up train was soon altered to call at Exeter. (Several through trains to the West of England continued to run via Bristol.)

When the West of England expresses started using the 1933 avoiding line at Westbury, the Weymouth slip portion of the down Cornish Riviera Express was slipped before reaching Heywood Road Junction; the station pilot then ran out to couple to it and bring it in to the station.

By 1947 the modern distinction between long-distance and purely local passenger trains had arisen. By this time the west of England trains ran over the route via Westbury avoiding line or station, and Frome avoiding line. There were through express trains from London to Weymouth via Westbury and Castle Cary, and an enhanced service from Bristol or Cardiff to Portsmouth Harbour via Westbury and Salisbury.

=== Freight ===
Little is recorded about goods and mineral traffic in the early years, but an easy and cheap connection was clearly hugely beneficial. Agricultural products, and the inwards requirements of farmers, and also of house and industrial coal and other manufactured goods were all important traffics.

Dominant freight services on the line in later years were coal trains from South Wales, to Southampton and Portsmouth particularly, and also coal from Radstock and Camerton to Bristol and elsewhere.

== Early signalling ==
From the earliest days of the line, the signalling system was by double-needle telegraph enabling simple messages to be passed. These enabled agreement between two stations to vary the timetabled crossing of opposing trains on the single line, in the event of late running. The telegraph was not ready in time for the opening from Yeovil to Dorchester Junction, and working by pilotman was used for the first few weeks, with a crossing place at Evershot. On the double track section from Thingley Junction to Westbury and Dorchester Junction to Weymouth, the time interval system was used.

The fixed signals consisted of a signal at the station or crossing place, not necessarily placed before the fouling point, which gave permission to enter the station, and an auxiliary signal placed further back which functioned like a distant signal. There were no starting signals: permission to proceed into a section was given by written order handed to the driver. The signals were mostly of the disc and crossbar type, and the points and signals were operated by lever at their location, with no interlocking.

In 1963 the GWR replaced the double needle telegraph instruments with a single needle system.

From 1870 the most difficult sections were equipped with the disc block system, which was permissive. (Note: As opposed to absolute; in absolute block a second train could not normally be permitted to enter a section until the preceding train was known to have left it; in permissive systems the following train could enter after a certain time lapse, but the driver was warned that the section might still contain the preceding train.)

Absolute block working started to be implemented from the end of 1874, and in the following few years recognisable signal boxes were constructed across the system, with interlocking. (Note: Primitive precursors of the signal box may have been erected at Weymouth in 1865 and Dorchester Junction in 1866, but probably did not include interlocking.) The electric train staff system was implemented on the single lines, and modern semaphore signals replaced most of the disc and crossbar signals over the following decade.

== Timber bridges ==
At the early date of construction of the WS&WR network, numerous structures were built in timber.

Two bridges between Thingley and Trowbridge were designed in timber but may not have been actually built in the material: Lacock Viaduct was to be a three-span underbridge with two timber piers and masonry abutments; and the turnpike road near Melksham was to cross the railway by a single span truss.

Near Staverton the railway crossed the River Avon on a viaduct with nine 20-foot (6 m) spans. At Yarnbrook it crossed the Trowbridge to Westbury road on a viaduct with a central skewed timber truss flanked by two masonry arches.

Near Frome at the (later) junction of the Radstock branch there was a two-span truss viaduct. When the Radstock branch was built an adjacent viaduct was built for its alignment, and there were five further river crossings in timber to Radstock.

Between Bathampton and Bradford Junction there were at least five timber viaducts: one is now the site of two bridges east of Bradford station, then two bridges west of Bradford over the Avon, Freshford Viaduct over the Kennet and Avon Canal, and Midford Brook viaduct. The last remaining timber viaduct, west of Bradford station, was rebuilt in 1889. On the Devizes branch there were three timber viaducts: Whaddon Bridge over the Avon, Outmarsh bridge over the Wilts & Berks Canal, and a timber viaduct over the turnpike road with a 56-foot (17 m) span and two 33-foot (10 m) spans.

== Topography ==
Stations and geographical junctions; entries in italic were not passenger stations; junctions are "facing" or "trailing" in the direction shown

=== Thingley Junction to Weymouth ===
Opened to Westbury 1848; to Frome 1851; to Yeovil 1856; and to Weymouth 1857.

- Thingley Junction; on the Great Western main line between Chippenham and Corsham;
- Trailing junction for Air Ministry Loop (west curve) 1943–1955;
- Lacock Halt; 1905–1966;
- Beanacre Halt; 1905–1955;
- Melksham; closed 1966; reopened 1985;
- Broughton Gifford Halt; 1905–1955;
- Holt Junction; trailing junction for the line from Devizes 1857–1966; passenger station opened 1861, (Note: Taken from Oakley, page 68; he says that "recent research" indicates that an exchange platform, but not a public station, opened in 1857, contradicting "most sources" which had stated 1861; the Holt residents celebrated the 1857 opening of the Devizes branch with a procession, and he suggests that "some means of access to the trains must have been provided"; a full public station opened on 1 April 1874. MacDermot in volume I part 1 page 414 says that "Holt Junction [first appears] in 1861 but only as a changing place till 1874". For a fuller discussion see Quick, Railway Passenger Stations of Great Britain - A Chronology, Railway & Canal Historical Society, 2019 (no ISBN)) closed 1966;
- Staverton Halt; 1905–1966;
- Bradford North Junction; facing junction for Bradford North Curve 1895–1990;
- Bradford South Junction; trailing junction for the Bathampton line from 1857;
- Trowbridge;
- Hawkeridge Junction; facing junction for Hawkeridge curve, towards Heywood Road Junction and Pewsey from 1942;
- Westbury; original station building had an overall roof; trailing junction from Lavington from 1900; facing junction for the Salisbury line from 1851;
- Fairwood Junction; trailing junction for the Westbury Avoiding Line from 1933;
- Clink Road Junction; facing junction for Frome Avoiding Line from 1933;
- Frome North Junction; facing junction for Radstock branch from 1854, forming a triangle with next from 1875; also known as Frome Mineral Loop Junction;
- Frome station; trailing junction for the Radstock line from 1875; the passenger station has an all-over roof;
- Blatchbridge Junction; trailing junction for the Frome Avoiding Line from 1933;
- Witham; facing junction for Shepton Mallet branch from 1858; station closed 1966; Shepton Mallet line closed to passengers in 1963 and cut back to Cranmore for mineral traffic only in 1969;
- Strap Lane Halt; 1932–1950;
- Bruton;
- Castle Cary; (Note: GWR public timetable of e.g. 1859 gave this as "Castle Carey".) facing junction for Somerton and Taunton from 1905;
- Sparkford; closed 1966;
- Marston; renamed Marston Magna 1895; closed 1966;
- Yeovil Pen Mill; facing junction for Yeovil Town 1857 to 1966; originally had an overall roof;
- Yeovil South Junction; facing junction to the former LSWR line from Yeovil Town to Yeovil Junction from 1943; the two routes ran parallel for some distance;
- Clifton Maybank Junction; facing junction for Clifton Maybank, originally break of gauge exchange sidings for the LSWR; closed 1937;
- Thornford Bridge Halt; opened 1936; renamed Thornford 1974;
- Yetminster;
- Chetnole Halt; opened 1933;
- Holywell Tunnel;
- Evershot; closed 1966;
- Cattistock Halt; 1931–1966;
- Maiden Newton; trailing junction for the Bridport branch 1857–1975;
- Grimstone and Frampton; closed 1966;
- Frampton Tunnel;
- Bradford Peverell and Stratton Halt; 1933–1966;
- Poundbury Tunnel;
- Dorchester; renamed Dorchester West 1949;
- Dorchester Junction; trailing junction for the Southampton and Dorchester Railway (later LSWR main line) from 1847;
- Came Bridge Halt; opened 1905; renamed Monkton and Came Halt later in 1905; closed 1957;
- Bincombe Tunnel;
- Upwey Wishing Well Halt; 1905–1957;
- Upwey; 1871–1886; (Note: There was an Upwey station on the Abbotsbury branch from its opening in 1885.)
- Upwey Junction; opened 1886; trailing junction for the Abbotsbury branch 1885–1952; renamed Upwey and Broadwey 1953; renamed Upwey 1980;
- Radipole Halt; 1905–1984;
- Weymouth Junction; facing junction for the Portland branch lines until 1965, and the Weymouth Harbour Tramway;
- Weymouth.

=== Westbury to Salisbury ===
Opened 1854 to Warminster, and in 1856 throughout.

- Dilton Marsh Halt; opened 1937;
- Warminster;
- Heytesbury; closed 1955;
- Codford; closed 1955;
- Wylye; closed 1955;
- Langford; closed 1857;
- Wishford; closed 1955;
- Wilton; renamed Wilton North 1949;
- Connection made to former LSWR line east of Wilton in 1973, and remainder of the original GWR route to Salisbury closed;
- Salisbury; originally with over-all roof; LSWR station subsequently built adjacent; closed to passengers 1932.

=== Bathampton to Bradford Junction ===
Opened 1857.

- Bathampton; facing junction on the main line from Bath to Chippenham;
- Limpley Stoke; trailing junction from the Camerton line 1910–1951; station closed 1966;
- Freshford;
- Avoncliff Halt; opened 1906;
- Bradford; renamed Bradford-on-Avon 1899;
- Bradford Tunnel (159 yards);
- Greenland Mill level crossing;
- Bradford West Junction; facing junction for Bradford North Curve, leading to Bradford North Junction 1895–1990;
- Bradford South Junction; trailing junction for the line from Thingley Junction.

=== Devizes branch ===
Devizes to Holt Junction: opened 1857; never double track; closed 1966

- Devizes; originally had an overall roof with a single platform; Berks and Hants Extension line from Hungerford formed an end-on junction in 1862;
- Bromham and Rowde Halt; opened 1909;
- Seend; opened 1858;
- Semington Halt; opened 1906;
- Holt Junction; trailing junction on the Thingley Junction line.

=== Radstock branch ===
Frome Mineral Loop Junction (Note: Probably called Radstock Junction originally.) to Radstock, opened 1854, and from Frome station (and throughout to passengers) forming a triangle from 1875; closed to passengers 1959; never double track; closed beyond Whatley Quarry 1988.

- Frome Mineral Junction; from 1875, the third apex of the Frome triangle;
- Mells; renamed Mells Road 1898;
- Radstock; end on junction formed by the Bristol and North Somerset Railway in 1873 (but break of gauge until 1874); renamed Radstock West 1949.

=== Gradients ===
On the post-1933 main line between Westbury and Castle Cary, gradients were significant, rising from Westbury at typically 1 in 151 but with short steeper sections to a summit at Brewham, near Strap Lane Halt; eastbound there was a continuous climb from Castle Cary to Brewham, with a ruling gradient of 1 in 98.

The Weymouth line was very difficult, climbing from Yeovil to a summit at Evershot, with a stiff final climb at 1 in 51, then falling somewhat less steeply and not continuously, to Dorchester. There was a difficult summit over the busy section between there and Weymouth, with a summit at Bincombe. The southbound climb was at 1 in 91 but northbound the gradient was a difficult 1 in 50–52.

Before about 1965, while unfitted (Note: Goods trains not equipped with a continuous brake, controlled by the driver, are described as "unfitted". On the approach to steep downhill gradients they were required to stop for the guard to pin down the handbrakes on sufficient wagons to enable a safe descent. This took a considerable time and blocked the line to following trains during the procedure.) goods trains were commonplace, line occupation on this busy section of line was significantly limited.

On the Bath to Salisbury line there was a stiff climb from Trowbridge to near Warminster, with a long stretch at 1 in 70 to 76.
