= Heart of Wessex Line =

Railway line in England

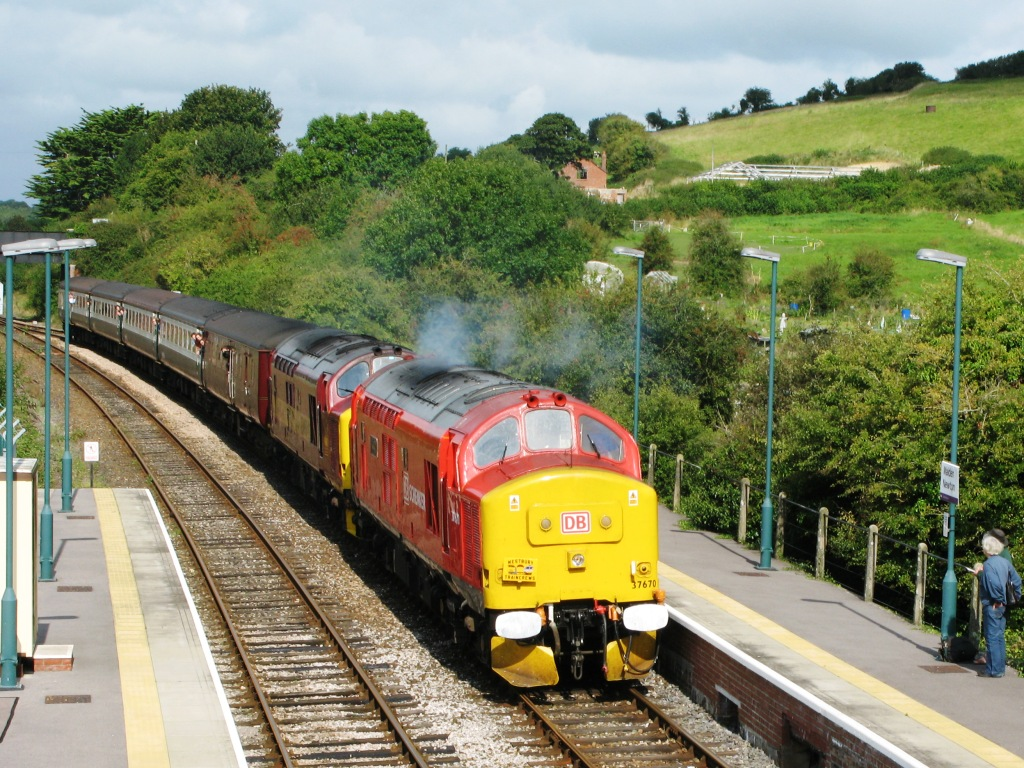
- Class 37s at Maiden Newton with a summer Saturday Bristol-Weymouth service in 2009

Overview
- Status: Operational
- Owner: Network Rail
- Locale: Wiltshire; Dorset; South West England

Service
- Type: Suburban rail, Heavy rail
- System: National Rail
- Ridership: 2,119,070 (2017)

Technical
- Line length: 87 mi 20 chains (140.4 km)
- Track gauge: 4 ft 8 1/2 in (1,435 mm) standard gauge
Route map
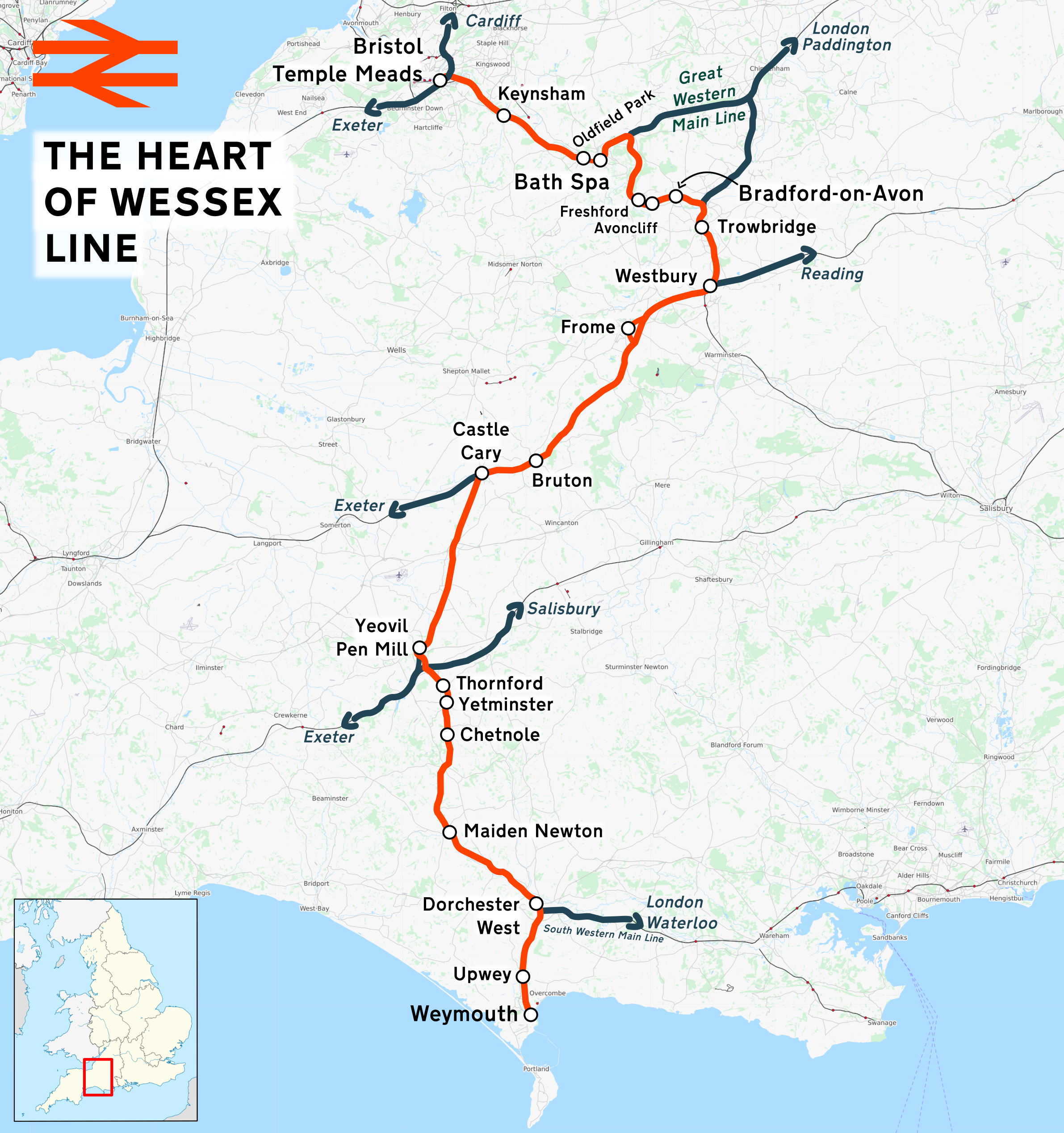

The Heart of Wessex Line, also known as the Bristol to Weymouth Line, is a railway line that runs from Bristol Temple Meads to Westbury and Weymouth in England. It shares the Wessex Main Line as far as Westbury and then follows the course of the Reading to Taunton Line as far as Castle Cary.

== Places served ==
The cities, towns and villages served by this route are:

- Bristol
- Keynsham
- Bath
- Freshford
- Avoncliff
- Bradford on Avon
- Trowbridge
- Westbury
- Frome
- Bruton
- Castle Cary
- Yeovil
- Thornford
- Yetminster
- Chetnole
- Maiden Newton
- Dorchester
- Upwey
- Weymouth

== Operator ==
Passenger services on the route are operated by Great Western Railway.

Most Great Western services originate from Gloucester. Some originate from other places such as Swindon and Cheltenham. As of May 2025, the weekday service on this line is hourly between Gloucester and Westbury, with a train in approximately every 2 hours running the whole way to Weymouth. There are only 3 departures each way between Bristol and Weymouth on a Sunday.

South Western Railway operate a limited service between London Waterloo and Yeovil Junction via Castle Cary. From summer 2016 there was also a "seaside special" service between Weymouth and Salisbury or Waterloo via Yeovil Junction, but this was withdrawn in 2020 during the COVID-19 pandemic.

== Rolling stock ==
Services are typically operated with Class 165 and Class 166 "Networker Turbo" trains. These were introduced in the late 2010s after they were released from the Thames Valley during the modernisation of the Great Western Main Line, although Class 158s are still occasionally used. South Western Railway services are operated by Class 159s and sometimes Class 158s.

Before the introduction of the Networker Turbo trains, the route was typically operated with Sprinter diesel multiple unit trains, typically of 2 or 3 coach Class 150, with some Class 158 trains.

Past rolling stock has included locomotive-hauled trains, including British Railways Mark 2 coaches hauled by Class 67 used to strengthen high-demand summer Saturday services in 2008–2010 between Bristol and the seaside resort of Weymouth.

== Community rail ==
A Bristol to Weymouth Rail Partnership was created in 1998 so that local authorities could support the line. In 2003 this was rebranded as the Heart of Wessex partnership and line. The TransWilts community rail partnership (CRP) gained accredited status under the Department for Transport's community rail programme which began in 2005.

In 2021, although the line's branding remains the same, the responsibility for the line was divided among three CRPs: Severnside CRP from Bristol to Bradford on Avon, TransWilts CRP covering Trowbridge and Westbury in Wiltshire, and the newly created South Wessex CRP covering stations from Frome to Yeovil in Somerset and from Thornford to Weymouth in Dorset.

== Accidents and incidents ==
- On 18 March 1849, a passenger train became divided approaching Keynsham. The rear portion then ran into the front portion when the latter stopped at the station. One person was injured.
- On 20 January 1853 a luggage train was derailed near Keynsham due to an axle failure on one of the carriages.
- On 7 June 1865, a passenger train ran into the rear of another near Keynsham, and an empty stock train ran into the wreckage. At least three people were injured.
- On 4 August 1868, a passenger train collided with the buffer stops at Weymouth due to poor rail conditions and driver error. Six people were injured.
- On 28 October 1873, a mail train passed a signal at danger and collided with a luggage train at Westbury.
- On 11 June 1875, a passenger train was derailed at Bathampton Junction. One person was killed and six were injured, three seriously.
- On 2 July 1876, a freight train was derailed at Bathampton Junction.
- On 15 August 1876, a freight train was derailed at Hampton Row after a bale of cotton fell off a wagon and derailed the one behind it.
- On 24 October 1882, a passenger train was derailed near Cattistock when a bridge collapsed under it due to a storm. Several people were injured, on seriously.
- On 8 August 1913, a passenger train ran into the rear of another at Yeovil Pen Mill due to passing a signal at danger. Two people were killed and ten injured, two seriously.
- On 11 January 1966, an express passenger train ran into the rear of another at St Anne's Park due to a signalman's error. A locomotive was then in a sidelong collision with the wreckage. Nineteen passengers were injured. Diesel-hydraulic locomotive D 1071 Western Renown was severely damaged; D 864 Zambesi was slightly damaged.
- On 25 August 1974, a passenger train was derailed at Dorchester West after passing a signal at danger. Eighteen people were injured.
- On 24 March 1987, a passenger train and a freight train were in a head-on collision at Frome due to the freight train passing a signal at danger. Locomotives 33 032 and 47 202 were severely damaged. Fifteen people were injured, some seriously.
- On 10 November 2008, a freight train was derailed at East Somerset Junction due to a signalman's error.
- On 12 November 2008, a passenger train collided with a van on a level crossing at Freshford. There were no injuries.
- On 6 December 2011, a train was derailed at Westbury.
- On 24 January 2013, a passenger train caught fire at Upwey.
- On 20 March 2017, a freight train was derailed at East Somerset Junction. The line was closed until 25 March.

== Bibliography ==
- R. V. J. Butt (1995). The Directory of Railway Stations. Patrick Stephens Ltd. ISBN 1-85260-508-1
- Robert Adley (1988). Covering My Tracks. Patrick Stephens Ltd. ISBN 0-85059-882-6
- J. H. Lucking. Railways of Dorset. Railway Correspondence and Travel Society 1968. ISBN(no ISBN)
