= Fugglestone St Peter =

Coordinates: 51.082°N 1.856°W

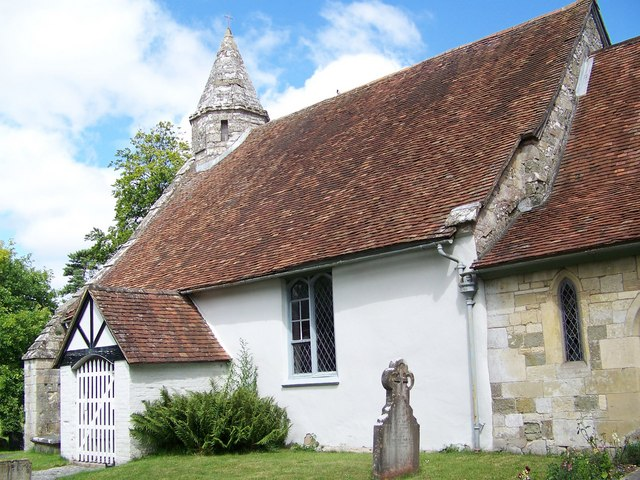
- St Peter's Church

- Location within Wiltshire
- OS grid reference: SU102314
- Civil parish: Wilton
- Unitary authority: Wiltshire
- Ceremonial county: Wiltshire
- Region: South West
- Country: England
- Sovereign state: United Kingdom
- Post town: Salisbury
- Postcode district: SP2
- Police: Wiltshire
- Fire: Dorset and Wiltshire
- Ambulance: South Western
- UK Parliament: Salisbury

Fugglestone St Peter was a small village, manor, and civil parish in Wiltshire, England, lying between the town of Wilton and the city of Salisbury. The civil parish came to an end in 1894 when it was divided between the adjoining parishes, and today Fugglestone is a largely residential area in the north of Wilton parish; however, the 13th-century parish church survives.

== History ==
The ancient parish of Fugglestone contained 1,778 acres and three rivers, the Nadder and two arms of the Wylye, so that some 40 acres (160,000 m^{2}) of the parish were under water. Fugglestone included the tithing of Quidhampton, the chapelry of Bemerton, and part of the hamlet of Burdens Ball.

According to John Leland, King Æthelbert of Wessex was buried at Fugglestone, suggesting an early monastic institution there. Apart from the 13th-century parish church of St Peter, little remains of the ancient village of Fugglestone, which stood at the western end of the parish near Wilton Abbey. Bemerton was at the other end of the parish, next to Fisherton Anger, and is mentioned in the Domesday Book of 1086; St Andrew's chapel was built there in the 14th century. Fugglestone manor was held by the abbey until the Dissolution, then was granted in 1544 to Sir William Herbert, later Earl of Pembroke; since then the nearby Wilton House has been the seat of the Pembrokes.

In 1236, the settlement was recorded as Fughelistone, meaning Fugol's Farm. The parish was part of Branch and Dole hundred. In the 17th century, the name of the parish had several different forms, including Fouggleston, Foulston and Fulston. The Church of England's record of the institution of Uriah Bankes as rector in 1660 refers to it as "Fouggleston als Foulston".

A 15th-century shoe found near Minster Street, Fugglestone, is in Salisbury Museum. The astrologer Simon Forman was born at Quidhampton in 1552. Fugglestone village was largely extinguished by the expansion of the park around Wilton House, the park's northern boundary reaching the churchyard by 1828. Earlier that century, the road from Wilton to Fugglestone, which passed east of the church, had been replaced by a straighter road to the west.

The Salisbury branch of the Great Western Railway (to Westbury and Warminster) was built across the parish in 1856, and was joined in 1859 by the Salisbury and Yeovil Railway (LSWR to Gillingham and Yeovil); the tracks ran side by side from Salisbury and diverged at Wilton. The LSWR's Wilton station – later Wilton South – was just inside the parish; the station closed in 1966.

In 1801 and in 1851 the parish population was just over 500, but by 1891 this had risen to 1,060, almost all in the Bemerton area. On 30 September 1894 the civil parish was dissolved, being divided between Wilton and the new parish of Bemerton. At the time of this division, sixteen houses and forty-six parishioners were transferred to Wilton, the rest going to Bemerton. Quidhampton became a separate civil parish in 1934.

A farm called 'Fugglestone Farm' still covered some 600 acres (2.4 km^{2}) in the 1920s. In 1949, Fugglestone Farmhouse, a square building of stone north of the A36 and dating from the late 19th century, was acquired by the War Office as the headquarters of the British Army's Southern Command, together with a large area of land where the Army has since built barracks, stores, married quarters, and other buildings, which became Erskine Barracks. After the Army moved to Marlborough Lines at Andover in 2010, the site was sold for housebuilding.

=== Hospitals and almshouses ===
In the Middle Ages there was a leper hospital at Fugglestone, called the Hospital of St Giles (Giles being, among other things, the patron saint of lepers), which stood on a spot now enclosed within the park of Wilton House. This was founded in about 1135 by Adelicia of Louvain, the queen of King Henry I, and the hospital claimed that Adelicia was entombed in its chapel. In 1645, the Mayor of Wilton petitioned the Wiltshire Quarter Sessions to provide relief for inmates of the hospital suffering from the bubonic plague. Of some forty poor people who had been admitted to the Hospital of St Giles, ten had died of the plague by 13 July 1645. The hospital was still in existence in 1814, when it supported a prior and four almspeople, but by then only the chapel was still standing, converted into lodgings for the poor. In 1851 these almshouses were replaced by a new row of cottages on the north side of the Warminster Road, the site of the hamlet of Burdens Ball, which are now known as 'St Giles's Hospital'. They were sited near the new almshouses of the former Hospital of St Mary Magdalene at Wilton, which had been founded before 1271, demolished in 1831, and its almspeople moved in 1832 to Fugglestone.

== Churches ==
A church at Fugglestone is first mentioned in 1291, and a chapel at Bemerton in 1286; in 1340 St Andrew's at Bemerton, some 1 1/2 miles (2.4 km) to the east, was described as dependent on St Peter's church at Fugglestone, and this may have been their relationship from the beginning. The rectory house was at Bemerton, close to St Andrew's.

=== St Peter ===
The small Church of England parish church dedicated to St Peter is mostly from the 13th century, with a bellcote and spirelet added probably in the 15th. It stands just beyond the northern boundary of the Wilton House estate, next to the A36 which is now a busy route into Salisbury from Wilton and the west. It has a three-bay nave in rubble stone (painted on the south side) and a narrower chancel in freestone. The brick south porch, also painted, is probably mid-19th century.

Inside there is a narrow south aisle, which possibly replaced an earlier wider aisle in the late 18th or early 19th century. The chancel arch may be from 1800 to 1830, and box pews are from the same period, with parts of the 17th-century pews reused against the walls. There was internal restoration in 1848, and the organ and east window are from the 1850s. The small west gallery, on cast iron columns, is also from that century.

In the sanctuary is a small 13th-century Purbeck marble coffin lid with an effigy. Two of the three bells were cast in 1628; they are said to be unringable. The church has no electricity, being lit by gas from Victorian fittings. The building was designated as Grade II* listed in 1951.

=== St Andrew ===
The small chapel at Lower Road, Bemerton is from the 14th century, with restoration in the 17th and 18th centuries, and more thoroughly in the 19th. The church is associated with the poet and priest George Herbert (1593–1633), who was rector of the parish from 1630.

=== St John ===
A much larger parish church was built near St Andrew's in 1861.

=== Church parish ===
The ancient parish of Fugglestone St Peter, or Fugglestone with Bemerton, included Quidhampton tithing. The ecclesiastical parish survived the demise of the civil parish in 1894, but went on to be reduced in size in stages. In 1938 an eastern portion of the parish was transferred, alongside part of Fisherton Anger parish, to form a district of St Michael to serve Bemerton Heath in anticipation of a church being built there. In 1957 the area northeast of the Devizes road was transferred to Stratford sub Castle.

The parish was renamed Bemerton with Fugglestone in 1969 to reflect the growth in population of Bemerton, which had been a suburb of Salisbury since 1927. In 1972 the Fugglestone area was merged with Wilton parish. Today St Peter's church is part of the parish of Wilton with Netherhampton and Fugglestone, and St Andrew's is in Bemerton parish.

Parish registers dating from 1568 (christenings and burials) and 1608 (marriages), other than those in current use, are held in the Wiltshire and Swindon History Centre in Chippenham.

== Present day ==
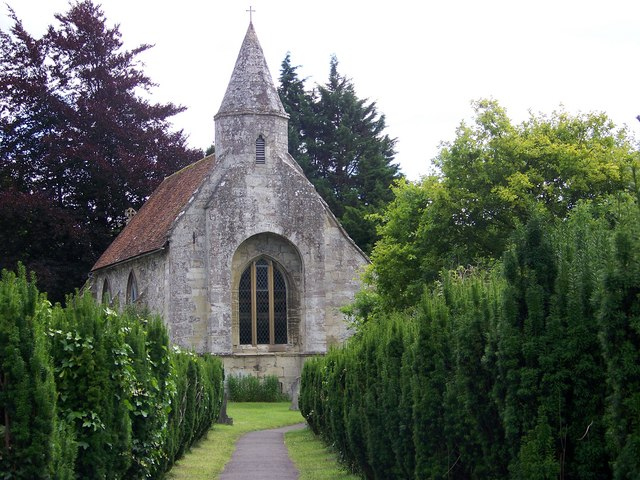
The path to the parish church

Apart from the church, no early buildings survive. The Wilton House estate has a garden centre and cafe just east of the church. In the triangle between the A36 and the railway are housing developments from the late 20th century and early 21st, named Fugglestone and Maple Close. Further west, on the southern section of the former Erskine Barracks site, is a 2016 housing development by Redrow which includes retirement apartments by McCarthy & Stone. Further north on The Avenue, redevelopment of the north section of the barracks includes Erskine House, which provides 44 flats for former military personnel and offers training for their return to civilian work.

=== Proposed railway station ===
Until 1955, Wilton North station was nearby, on the Salisbury to Westbury line. On the opposite side of The Avenue, a park and ride site was opened by Salisbury Council in the early 2000s. Since 2015, proposals have been made for a Wilton Parkway railway station next to it, to serve the west side of Salisbury and provide a fast route to the city centre. As of 2021, no government funding has been provided to take this forward.

=== Fugglestone Red and St Peter's Place ===
A 1990s housing estate was named Fugglestone Red after a nearby farm. As of 2021, a second housing development (with a primary school) is being built by Persimmon Homes northwest of Bemerton Heath and Fugglestone Red, called St Peter's Place. Both areas were in the far north of Fugglestone parish and are now part of Salisbury.

== List of rectors ==
- Walter Curle, 1620 to 1629
- George Herbert, 1629 to 1633
- Thomas Laurence, mid 17th century
- Uriah Bankes, 1660 to 1667
- John Norris, 1692 to 1711
- William Periam, 1744
- Henry Hawes, 1744 to 1759
- John Hawes, 1759 to 1788
- William Coxe, 1788 to 1828
- Charles Eddy, 1828 to 1830
- John Eddy, 1830
