= South Newton =

Village in Wiltshire, England

Coordinates: 51.110°N 1.879°W

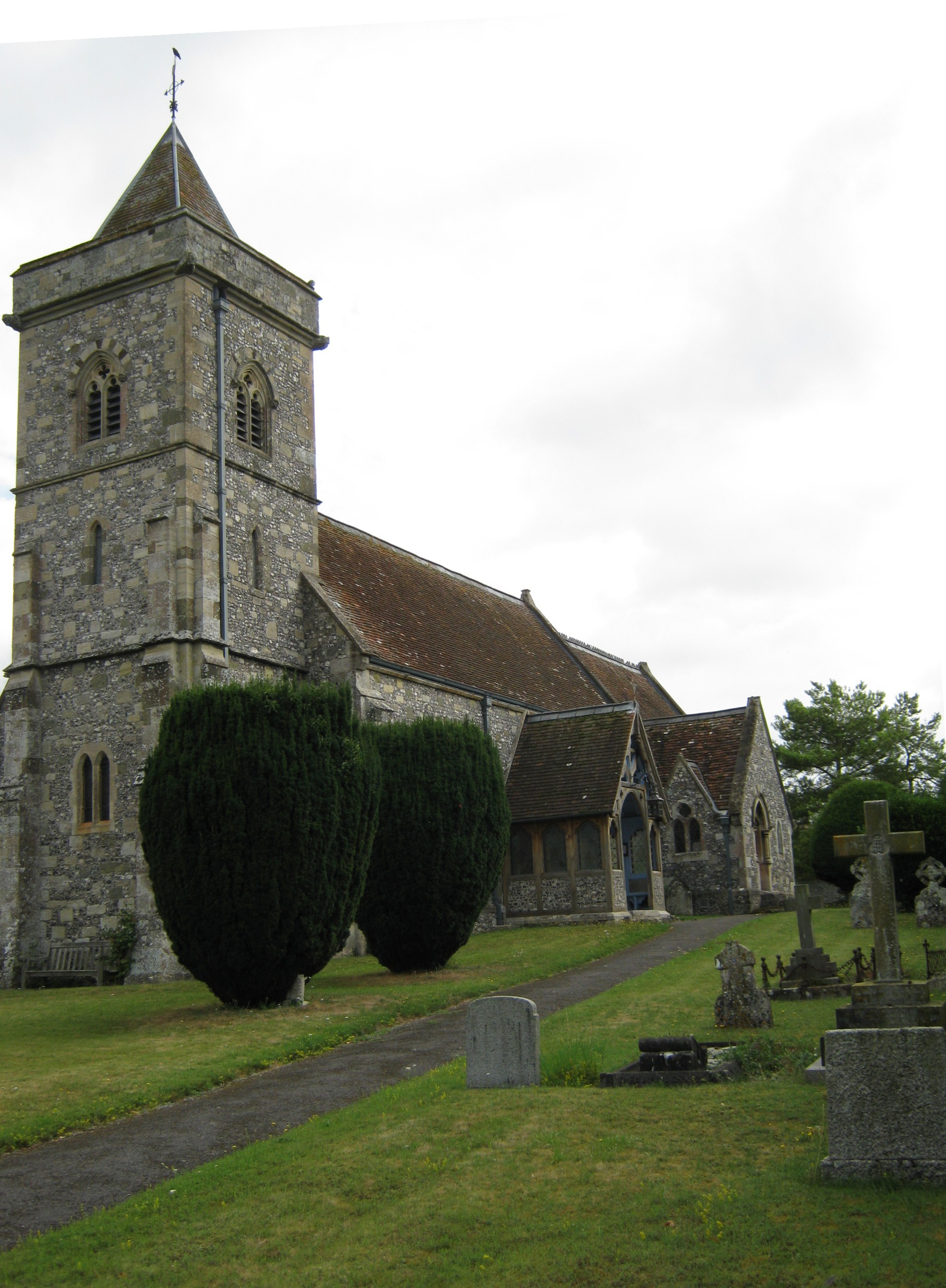
- St. Andrew's parish church

- Location within Wiltshire
- Population: 819 (2011 Census)
- OS grid reference: SU086345
- Civil parish: South Newton
- Unitary authority: Wiltshire
- Ceremonial county: Wiltshire
- Region: South West
- Country: England
- Sovereign state: United Kingdom
- Post town: Salisbury
- Postcode district: SP2
- Dialling code: 01722
- Police: Wiltshire
- Fire: Dorset and Wiltshire
- Ambulance: South Western
- UK Parliament: East Wiltshire
- Website: Parish Council

South Newton is a village and civil parish about 4 miles (6.4 km) north-west of Salisbury in Wiltshire, England. Topologically it lies between chalk downs to the north-east, and downland with Grovely Wood to the south-west. The village straddles the A36 road and is on the left bank of the River Wylye, which defines much of the western boundary of the parish; the eastern boundary follows the A360 Salisbury-Devizes road.

The parish includes the village of Stoford (not to be confused with Stoford, Somerset) and the hamlets of Little Wishford and Chilhampton. In 2011 the parish had a population of 819.

== History ==
There is scant evidence of significant prehistoric habitation in South Newton.

There has been a settlement in the village since Saxon times and South Newton is largely a 10th-century estate which stretched from the River Wylye to the ridge of the hills to the north-east. The village originated at about the same time as its three neighbours Stoford, Chilhampton and Little Wishford, each village having a strip of land down to the river and up onto the downland of the drainage area. In 1086 the Domesday survey recorded 42 households at Newenton or Newentone.

The ancient parish had a detached part at North Ugford, on the other side of the Wylye and bounded to the south by the Nadder. This area (now farmland, and the hamlet of Ugford on the A30) was by 1884 divided between Burcombe and Wilton parishes. Various other portions have been ceded to other parishes during the last 150 years. About 300 yards (270 m) south of the church is an ancient watermill on the banks of the River Wylye.

In 1837 the workhouse for the Wilton poor law union was built in the far south of the parish, next to what is now the A36 in the area called Burden's Ball (now in Wilton parish). The three-storey building in red brick accommodated 280, in a cruciform plan similar to workhouses designed by Sampson Kempthorne.

The railway between Salisbury and Westbury, completed in 1856, runs on the opposite side of the Wylye. Wishford station at Great Wishford was about 1 mile (1.6 km) north-west of South Newton. The station was closed in 1955 but the railway remains open as part of the Wessex Main Line.

== Parish church ==
The Church of England parish church of Saint Andrew is at the east end of the village and is constructed largely of rubblestone with ashlar dressing, and some flint and stonework chequering. In 1861–2 the church underwent radical reconstruction to designs by T.H. Wyatt but the chancel retains some 13th-century features.

The three-stage west tower was rebuilt in the 14th century. In 1553 it had four bells, two of which are survive as the current tenor and second bell. They were cast by the Salisbury foundry, one in about 1400 and the other in about 1499. The present tenor bell was cast by John Wallis of Salisbury in 1610. The bells that complete the current ring of six were cast by John Warner of Cripplegate in London: one in 1862 and the treble and second bell in 1887, the year of Queen Victoria's Golden Jubilee.

In 1992 the parish became part of the Wylye and Till Valley benefice, which is today a group of eight village parishes.

== Local economy ==
The village has a small light industrial estate containing about 10 businesses. Nearby is a large building and maintenance company. The village also has a large neuro-physiological rehabilitation nursing home. These companies provide significant local employment.

== Social amenities ==
The village has a public house, The Bell Inn. South Newton has a cricket club and a junior football club.
