= Dick Parsons (British Army officer) =

English soldier and marksman (1910–1998)

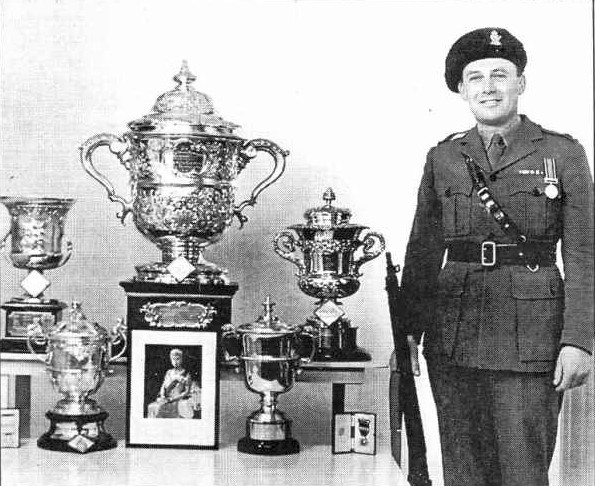
Dick Parsons standing beside some of the trophies he won in rifle competitions

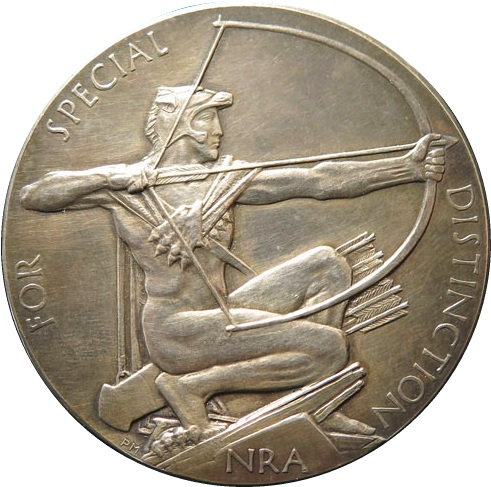
Dick Parsons won the King's Medal (shown above) at the 1949 and 1950 NRA annual rifle competitions in Bisley, Surrey

Lieutenant-Colonel Richard Martyn Parsons (1 November 1910 – 7 June 1998) was a British Army marksman who played an important role developing and testing small arms and ammunition during the Second World War, and whose performance in post-war rifle competitions established him as one of the finest rifle marksmen in Britain.

Parsons was born in Bristol, and educated at Trent College, Derbyshire. His uncle was the architect Bertram Charles Hill. Also, one of his elder brothers was Ernest Geoffrey Parsons.

== Military career ==
Parsons was commissioned in 1929 into the Royal Ulster Rifles, and went on in 1932 to become the Northern Ireland rifle champion. His prowess as a marksman made him a candidate for additional training, and he was sent in 1938 to a Long Small Arms technical course at the Ministry College of Science, where he became one of the first infantry officers to be awarded a technical qualification. This resulted in his being assigned during the war to rifle testing trials and small arms development for the War Office and Ministry of Defence. He was also posted to the Ordnance Department. He spent two years at the end of the war in Washington, D.C., and then was reassigned to the War Office, before being given the command in 1949 of his regimental depot.

It was in post-war rifle competitions where Parsons' marksman abilities became legendary. Shooting in 1949 and 1950 for his regimental team in National Rifle Association (NRA) competitions at the National Shooting Centre in Bisley, Surrey, he won the King's Medal (the highest honour) both years in a row, which made him the champion shot in the British Isles. He also won in 1949 the NRA Service Rifle Championships, the Queen Mary Cup and the Wantage Cup, the latter being the first time anyone had won the cup with a perfect shooting score. He eventually shot every year until 1959 with his regimental team at the Bisley competition.

His marksmanship was also unsurpassed in the Army Operational Shooting Competition at Bisley. He won the Bronze Jewell award there at the 1947, 1954 and 1955 competitions, and in 1951 he won the Silver Jewell as well. He ultimately shot in the Army competitions for 11 consecutive years (except 1953), and his name appears on every individual Rifle Championship Cup save one in the Army Rifle Association.

Parsons retired from the Army with the rank of Lieutenant-Colonel and moved to Bath, Somerset, where he was active in his later years in the restoration of historic buildings in the city. He died at the age of 87 on 7 June 1998 in Bath.
