= Great Wishford =

Coordinates: 51.119°N 1.886°W

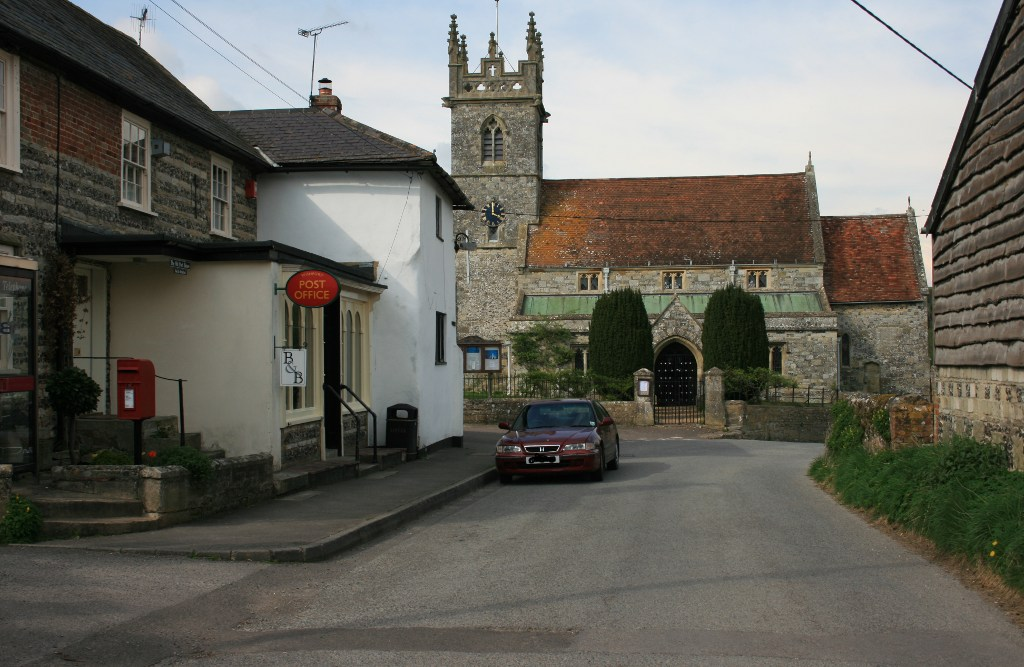
- St Giles' Church, Great Wishford

- Location within Wiltshire
- Population: 368 (in 2011)
- OS grid reference: SU080355
- Unitary authority: Wiltshire
- Ceremonial county: Wiltshire
- Region: South West
- Country: England
- Sovereign state: United Kingdom
- Post town: SALISBURY
- Postcode district: SP2
- Dialling code: 01722
- Police: Wiltshire
- Fire: Dorset and Wiltshire
- Ambulance: South Western
- UK Parliament: East Wiltshire
- Website: Parish Council

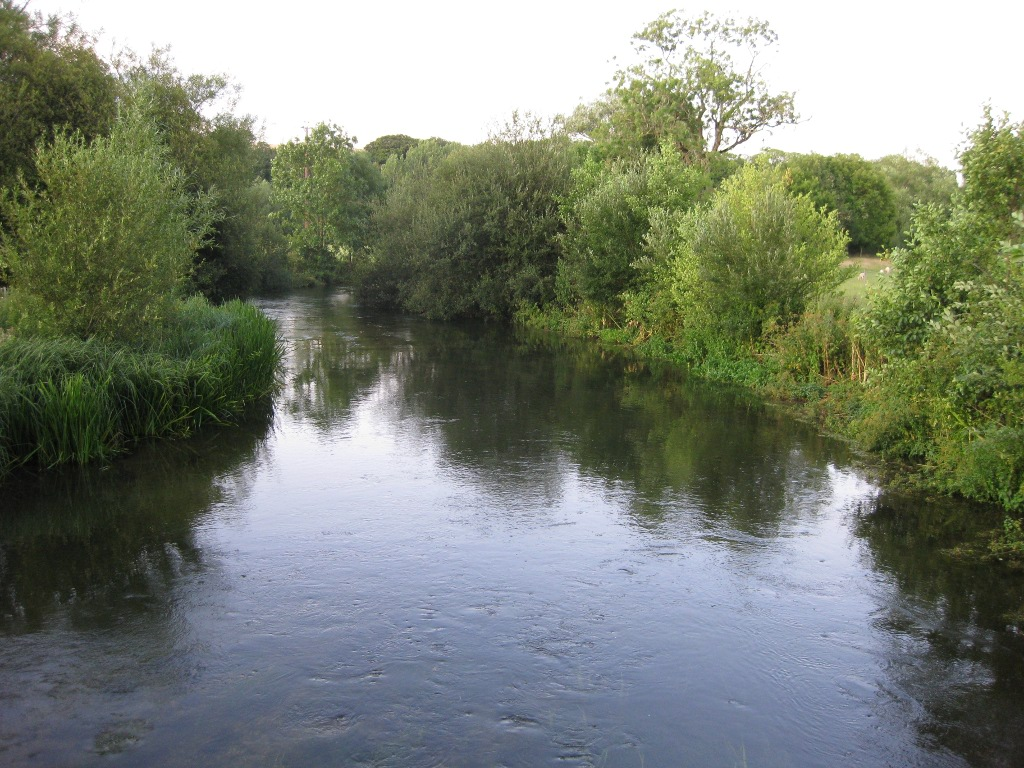
Wylye River

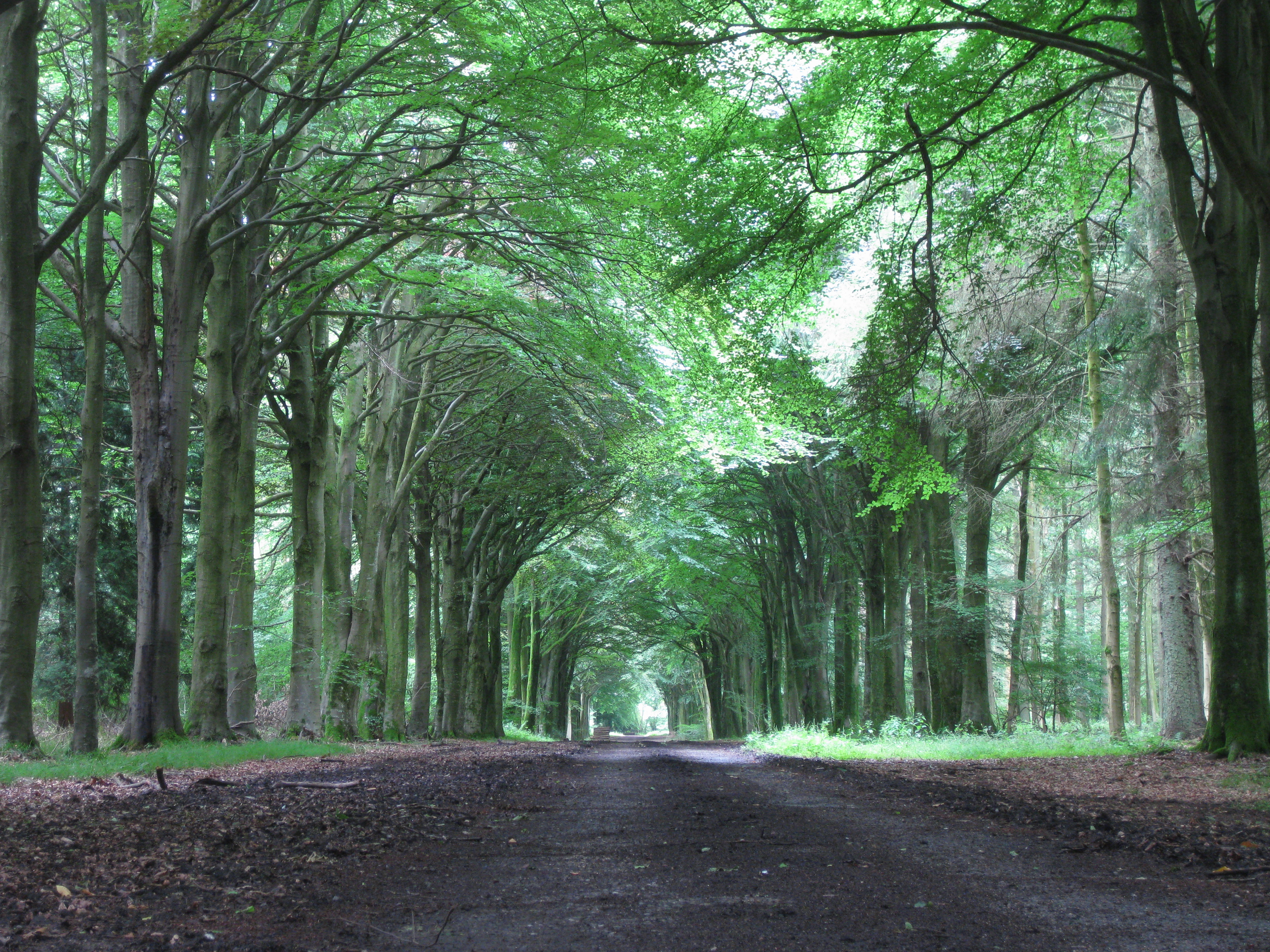
Grovely Wood

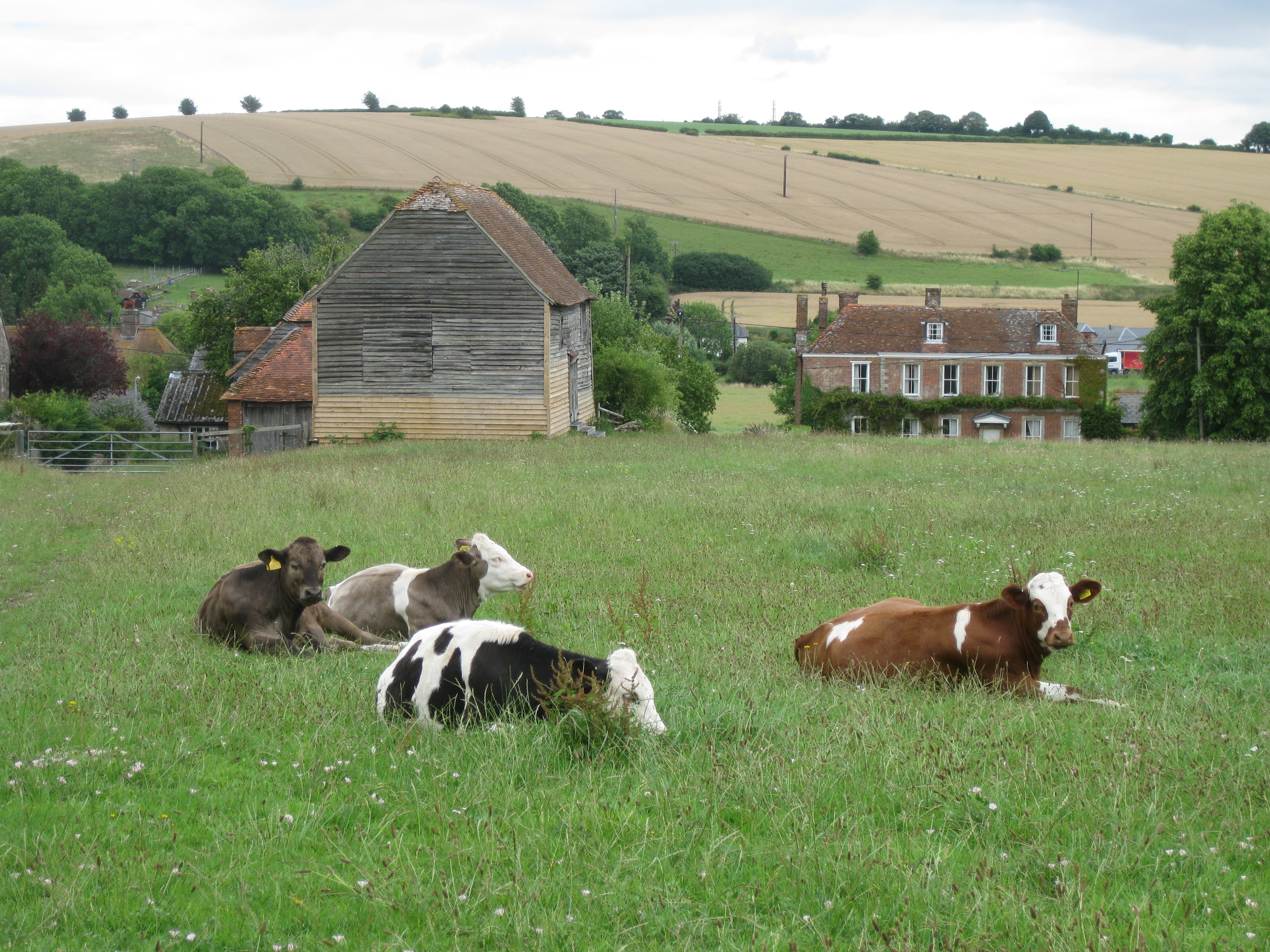
Oak Apple Field

Great Wishford is a village and civil parish in the Wylye Valley in Wiltshire, England, about three miles (5 km) north of Wilton and five miles (8 km) northwest of Salisbury. The village lies west of a bend in the River Wylye and has a triangular street layout comprising South Street, West Street and Station Road.

== History ==
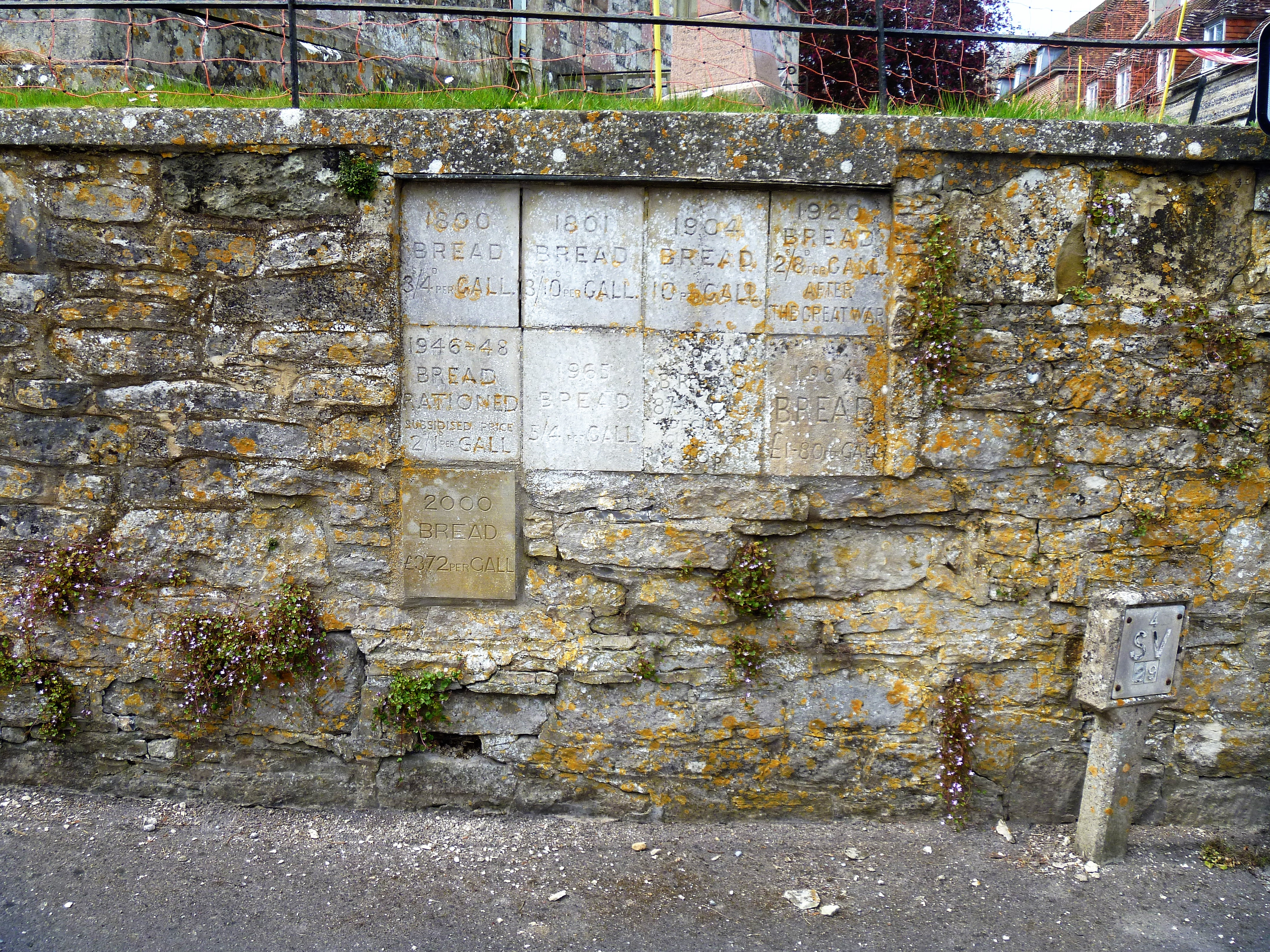
The "bread stones" before a tenth was added to mark the Platinum Jubilee of Elizabeth II in 2022

To the west of the village lies the Iron Age settlement and possible hillfort of Ebsbury.

The village pre-dates the Norman conquest of 1066, but was only a hamlet at this time. The name has evolved over the years, with recorded names including Wicheford (meaning a ford where wych-elms grow), Witford, Willesford Magna (mid-16th century) and Wishford Magna (early 17th century). Set into the wall of the churchyard is a series of ten engraved "bread stones" that record the price of bread from 1800 (during the Napoleon blockade) to 2022.

Wishford House, West Street, is from the 18th century. It was altered and refronted in c. 1800, and extended later in that century.

Grovely Wood, between Great Wishford and Barford St Martin, was an extra-parochial area. By 1839, the boundary of Barford parish had moved north to include almost all of the woodland.

By the will of Sir Richard Howe (c. 1651–1730), a school was established in 1722 at Wishford for teaching reading, writing, accounts, and the Church catechism to twenty poor boys and twenty girls. In 1833 this had an income of £63.5s and was teaching the forty children plus a varying number of "pay-scholars", for whom a small fee was payable. The school's original single-storey brick building stands on West Street, opposite the churchyard; the school was extended (by building at the rear) in the late 19th century, again in the 20th and most recently in 2005.

== Parish church ==
A church at Great Wishford was recorded in 1207. The present Church of England parish church of St Giles, built of flint and limestone, has a 13th-century chancel and 15th-century tower and was improved in the 16th century, but largely rebuilt during restoration in 1863–4 by T.H. Wyatt. The font bowl is 12th-century, on a 19th-century base. The tower has six bells, five of them from the 18th century.

The extra-parochial area of Grovely Wood was added to the parish in 1952. In 1960 the church was designated as Grade II* listed. Today the parish is part of the Lower Wylye and Till Valley benefice.

A rectory was built in the late 17th century, across the road to the east of the church. It was altered and extended in the 18th and 19th, and became a private house in 1976.

== Oak Apple Day ==
Great Wishford is one of the few villages that still celebrate Oak Apple Day on 29 May each year. On this day, Great Wishford villagers claim their ancient rights to collect wood from Grovely Wood. This tradition is said to date back to 1603, when the charter of rights to collect wood in the Royal Forest of Groveley was confirmed by the Forest Court. The rights themselves date back several centuries before 1603. It is a matter of debate whether this tradition has been kept up continuously since the 17th century, or whether it was revived or re-invented in the late 19th century.

The events of a modern Oak Apple Day include a "band" waking the villagers in the early hours of the morning, gathering oak branches from the woods at dawn, a village breakfast in the local pub (Royal Oak), then on to Salisbury, where there is dancing outside the Cathedral followed by claiming rights inside the cathedral by shouting "Grovely, Grovely, Grovely and all Grovely". (Although the charter requires just three 'Grovely's, tradition demands four – "Three for the charter and one for us".) In the afternoon there is a formal meal, and other events for villagers in Oak Apple Field.

These days, most villagers put more effort into claiming their rights than in exercising them: the handcarts used to transport wood from Grovely seem to have entirely disappeared.

== Amenities ==
The school continues as Great Wishford CofE (VA) Primary School. There is a pub, the Royal Oak, but the village no longer has a shop or post office. There are also a cricket pitch and a children's play area which are shared with the neighbouring village of South Newton.

The Wylye river runs to the east of Great Wishford, and is used for trout fishing. Wilton Fly Fishing Club, founded in 1891, is based in the village.

== Transport ==
The A36 trunk road runs along the Wylye valley across the river from the village.

Great Wishford had a station on the Salisbury branch line (Great Western Railway) from 1856 until its closure in 1955. Trains now pass through the village on the Wessex Main Line between Salisbury and Bristol without stopping. Bungalows have been built where the station platform used to be, and the station master's house is now a private home.

National Cycle Route 24 and the Monarch's Way long-distance footpath pass close to the village.

== Notable residents ==
- Ernest Geoffrey Parsons (1901–1991), farmer and Commissioner of the Crown Estates.
