= Codford railway station =

Former railway station in England

Codford
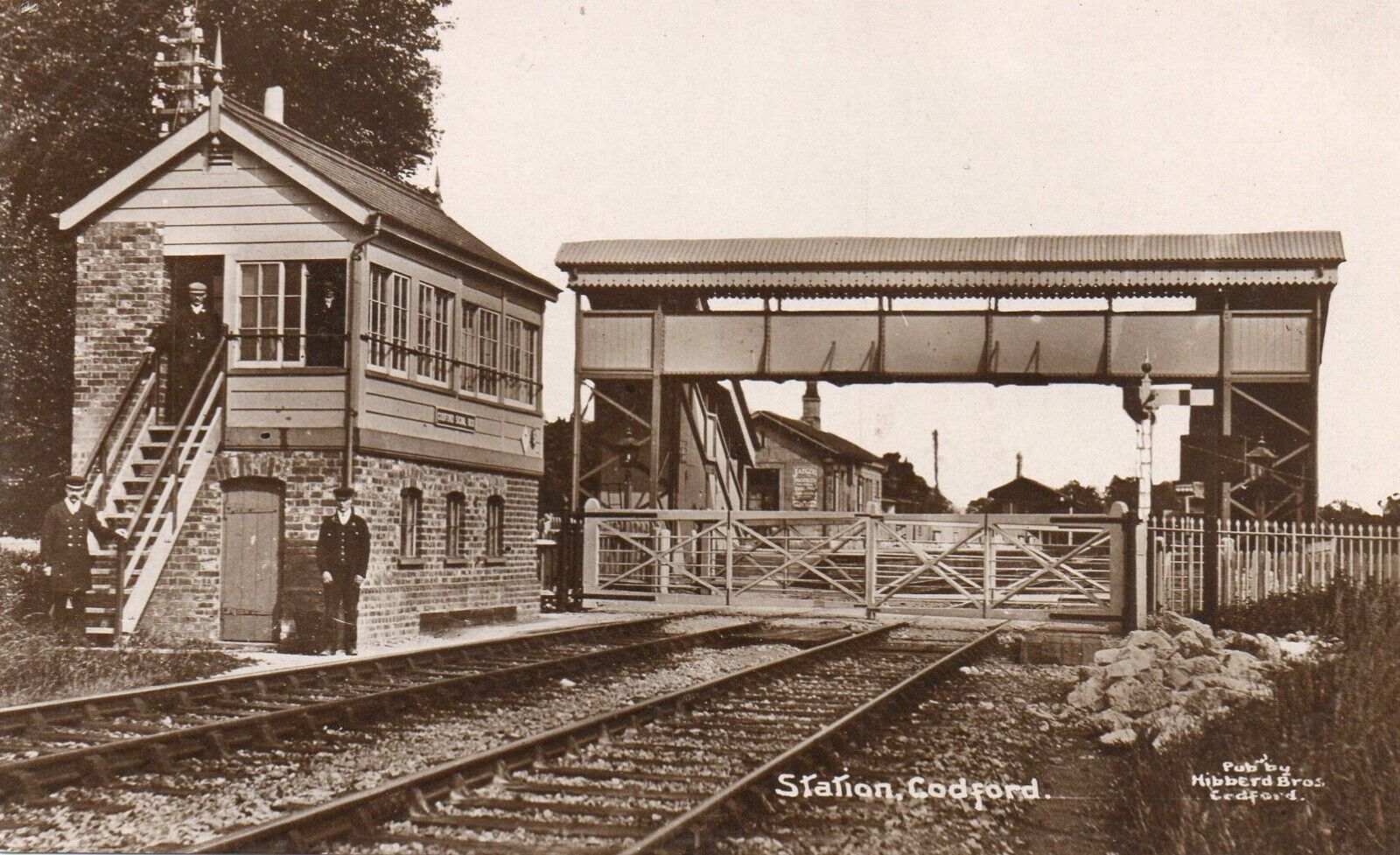

General information
- Location: Codford, Wiltshire; England
- Coordinates: 51.15994°N 2.06708°W
- Platforms: 2

Other information
- Status: Disused

History
- Original company: Great Western Railway

Key dates
- 30 June 1856: Opened
- 19 September 1955: Closed
Location

Codford railway station was an intermediate station on the Salisbury branch line of the Great Western Railway built along the Wylye valley to connect Warminster and Salisbury to serve the surrounding villages, and situated along the lane from Codford St Peter to Boyton.

== History ==
The station opened on 30 June 1856, at the same time as this section of the line. The original single platform was built on the north side of the line next to a level crossing. A passing loop was installed here in 1897 which necessitated the construction of a second platform to serve trains towards Westbury. The line was doubled from Heytesbury in 1899 and on to Wylye in 1900.

When an army camp was built at Codford in 1914, a 2.75-mile (4.43 km) branch line was built connecting it to the station. The branch was taken over at the end of the First World War by the Great Western Railway but closed in 1922.

The station lost its passenger service on 19 September 1955 and its goods yard was closed on 10 June 1963. The signal box remained in use until June 1982, when the level crossing was automated.

== Services ==
The station was served by stopping trains on the Westbury to Salisbury line. Trains still run between Warminster and Salisbury, but no longer stop anywhere in between.

Preceding station	Historical railways	Following station
Heytesbury	Great Western Railway; Salisbury branch line	Wylye
