= Dilton =

Dilton may refer to:

- Dilton Doiley, a character in Archie Comics
- Dilton Marsh, a village in Wiltshire
  - Dilton Marsh railway station
