= Wilton North railway station =

Former railway station in England

Wilton North
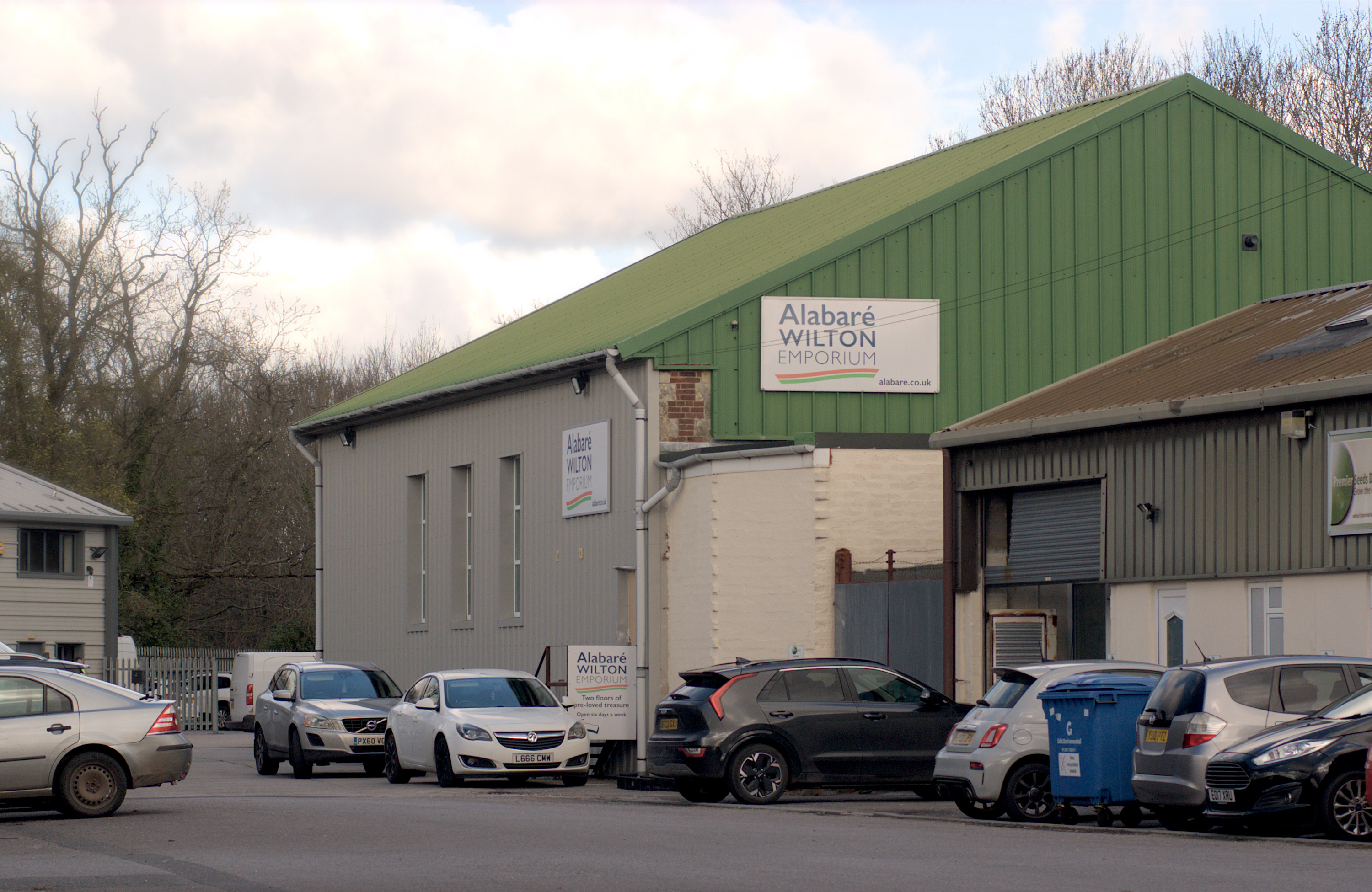
- The site of the former goods shed

General information
- Location: Wilton, Wiltshire; England
- Coordinates: 51.0871°N 1.8590°W
- Grid reference: SU099319
- Platforms: 2

Other information
- Status: Disused

History
- Original company: Great Western Railway
- Post-grouping: Great Western Railway

Key dates
- 30 June 1856: Opened as Wilton
- September 1949: renamed Wilton North
- 19 September 1955: Closed to passengers
- 6 September 1965: Closed to freight
Location

Wilton North railway station is a former railway station serving Wilton, Wiltshire, England. The station was opened in 1856 by the Great Western Railway on its Salisbury branch from Westbury. It was closed to passengers in 1955 and completely in 1965.

== History ==
Opened with the line on 30 June 1856, the station had at first just one platform, on the left of trains towards Westbury. A second platform was added when the line was doubled in 1896. Along with other local stations it was closed on 19 September 1955, but remained open for goods traffic until 6 September 1965. The goods shed remains intact and is used as a shop.

A short distance to the south, the Salisbury and Yeovil Railway opened a station called Wilton in 1859, on the route that became the West of England line of the London and South Western Railway. In September 1949 the former LSWR station was renamed Wilton South, and the former GWR station became "Wilton North".

== Possible reopening ==
In 2015, the TransWilts Community Rail Partnership proposed a new Wilton Parkway station immediately to the east, on the other side of Kingsway road bridge. A two-platform, six-carriage-length station would serve the adjacent Park and Ride, as well as the Fugglestone Red housing estate which was being built on the former and adjacent Erskine Barracks site. Besides providing a link to Salisbury and access to London services, there could be services to other parts of Wiltshire on the TransWilts route.

As of 2021, Wiltshire Council continues to support the proposal (sometimes called Wilton Junction), but no government funding has been forthcoming. Wilton was not among the projects selected for feasibility studies by the Department for Transport under the 2020–2021 "Restoring your railway" initiative.

Preceding station	Historical railways	Following station
Wishford; Line open, station closed	Great Western Railway; Salisbury branch line	Salisbury; Line and station open
