= Wessex Main Line =

Railway line in England

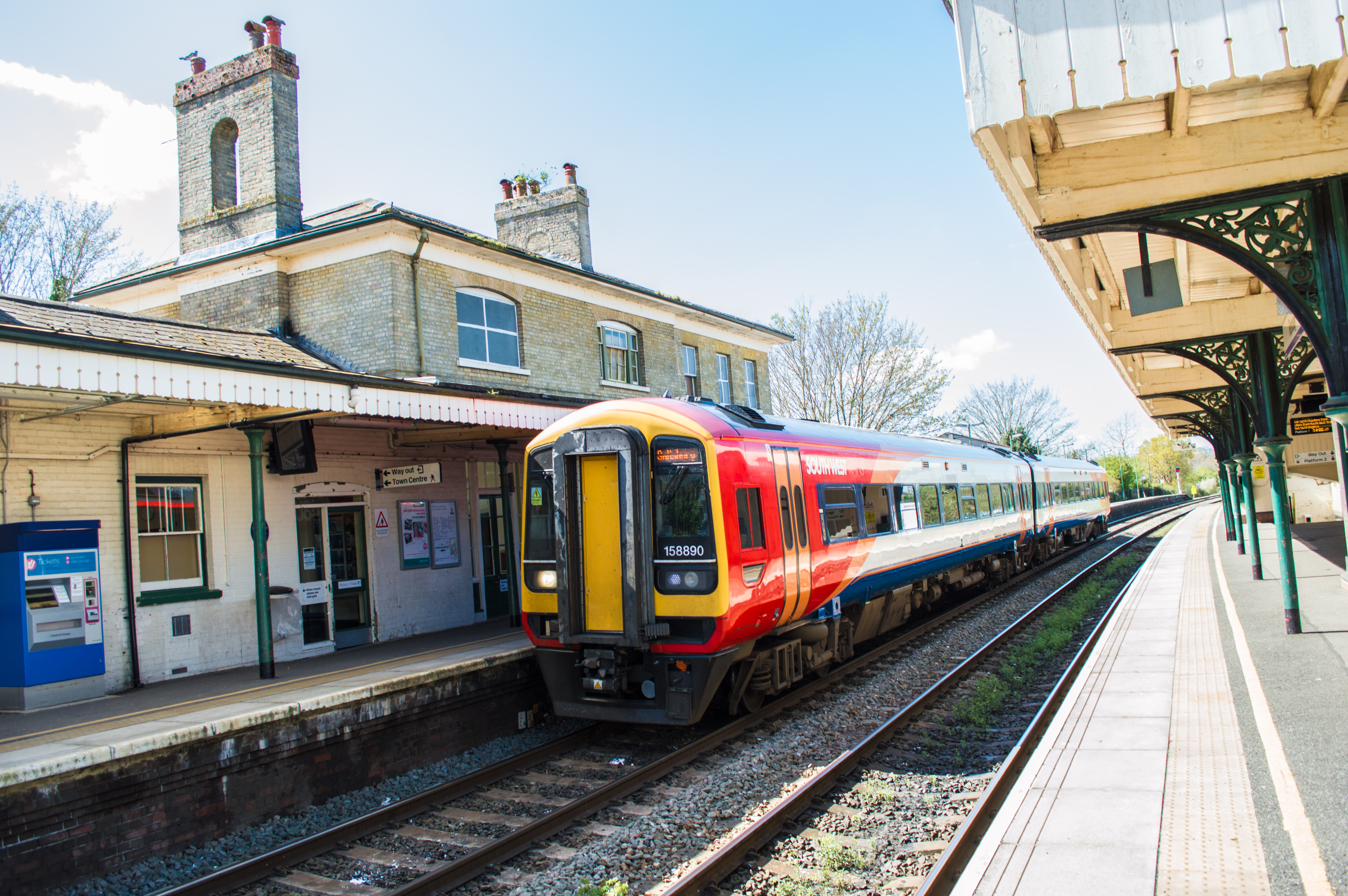
- A South West Trains Class 158 at Romsey in 2014

Overview
- Status: Operational
- Owner: Network Rail
- Locale: Somerset; Wiltshire; Hampshire; South East England; South West England

Service
- Type: Regional rail, Heavy rail
- System: National Rail

Technical
- Line length: 85mi 49ch (137.77 km)
- Track gauge: 1,435 mm (4 ft 8 1/2 in) standard gauge
Route map
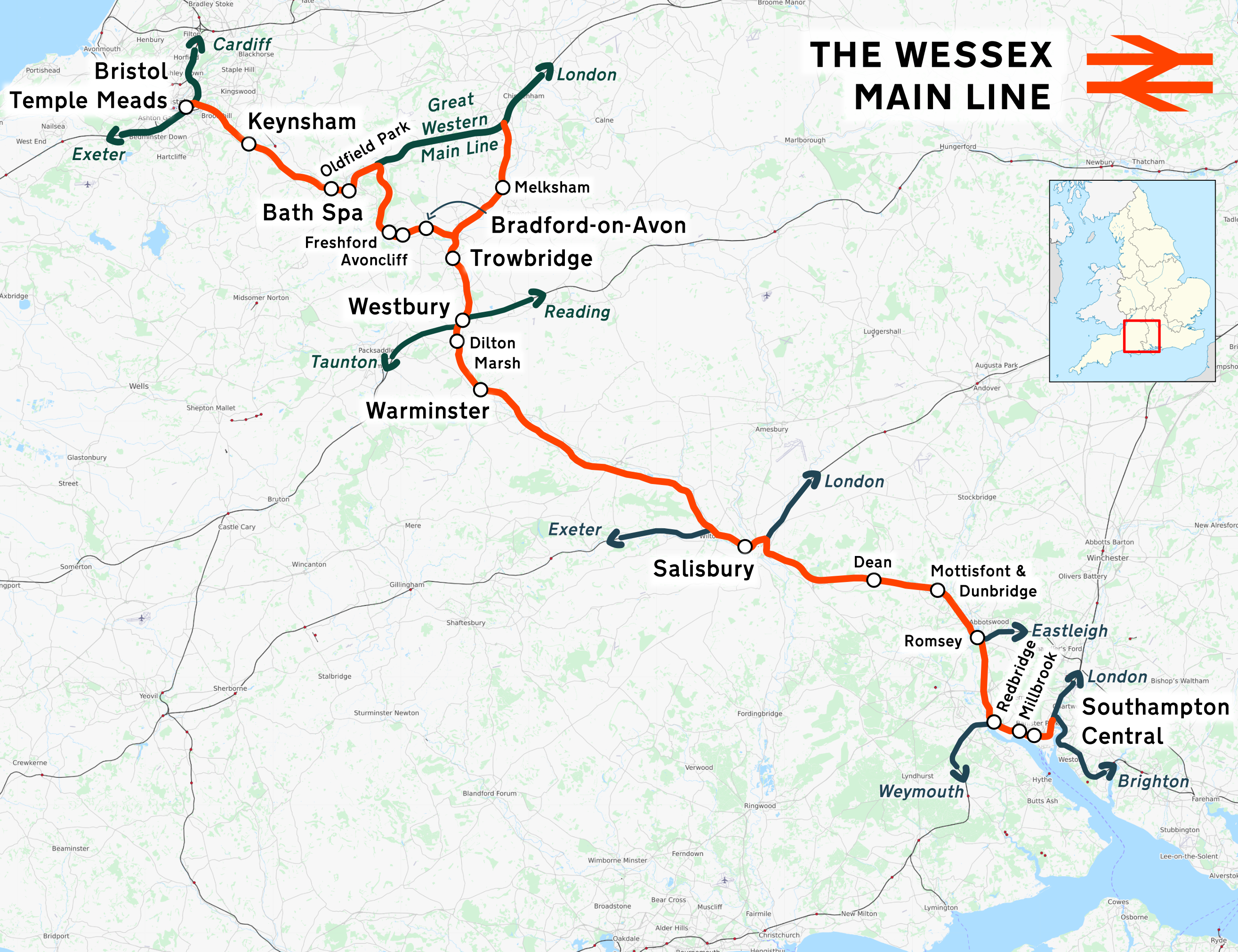
(Click to expand)

The Wessex Main Line is the railway line from Bristol Temple Meads to Southampton Central. Diverging from this route is the Heart of Wessex Line from Westbury to Weymouth. The Wessex Main Line intersects the Reading to Taunton Line at Westbury and the West of England Main Line at Salisbury.

== Stations served ==
The stations served are listed below.

- Bristol Temple Meads
- Keynsham
- Oldfield Park
- Bath Spa
  - Great Western Main Line diverges to Chippenham, Swindon and London Paddington
- Freshford
- Avoncliff
- Bradford-on-Avon
  - TransWilts Line joins from Melksham, Chippenham and Swindon
- Trowbridge
- Westbury
  - Heart of Wessex Line diverges to Frome, Yeovil Pen Mill and Weymouth
- Dilton Marsh
- Warminster
- Salisbury
- Dean
- Mottisfont & Dunbridge
- Romsey
  - Eastleigh to Romsey Line diverges to Chandlers Ford and Eastleigh
  - South Western Main Line joins from Bournemouth, Poole and Weymouth
- Redbridge
- Millbrook
- Southampton Central

Passenger services are currently operated by Great Western Railway services between Portsmouth Harbour and Cardiff Central , supplemented by South Western Railway between Salisbury and Southampton Central with their service between Salisbury and Romsey via Southampton Central, and by Great Western Railway intercity services between Bristol Temple Meads and Bath Spa that operate between London Paddington and Bristol Temple Meads. Some services start at Swindon. Almost all Great Western Railway services continue beyond Southampton Central along the West Coastway line to Portsmouth Harbour, and beyond Bristol Temple Meads to Severn Tunnel Junction, Newport and Cardiff Central along the South Wales Main Line.

== Chippenham branch ==
There is a link from Trowbridge to Chippenham, with an intermediate stop at Melksham. Despite showing strong passenger growth in the previous few years, the new franchise reduced services in December 2006 to two each way per day, at times barely convenient for commuters. The frequency was increased from December 2013 and services were extended south to Westbury and north to Swindon, providing a regular timetable branded as TransWilts.

== History ==
=== Southampton to Salisbury ===
The South West Main Line of the London and Southampton Railway, which changed its name to the London and South Western Railway in 1839, had reached Southampton in 1840. A branch to Salisbury (Milford) from a junction on the main line at Eastleigh (then called Bishopstoke) was opened in 1847. The branch passes through Romsey and the Dean valley; today part of its route forms the Eastleigh–Romsey line.

A more direct route between Southampton and Romsey was adopted in 1865 on completion of the Sprat and Winkle Line (at first by the Andover and Redbridge Railway, but taken over by the LSWR before completion). This forms the current route of the Wessex Main Line: departing westbound from Southampton Central via Millbrook and Redbridge before branching north to Romsey.

=== North of Salisbury ===
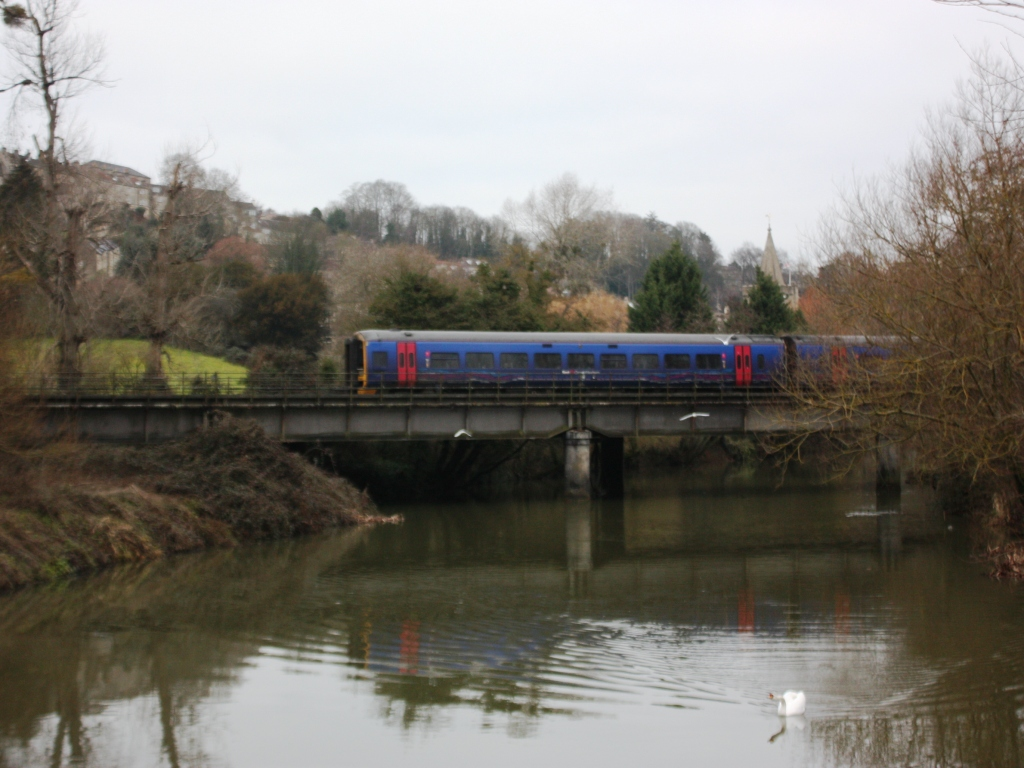
Crossing the river at Bradford-on-Avon

The line through Wiltshire and Somerset was completed in stages, after the Wilts, Somerset and Weymouth Railway (WS&WR) was authorised by Parliament in 1845. The first section to be opened, in 1848, ran from Thingley junction to the west of Chippenham on the Great Western Railway, via Melksham and Trowbridge to Westbury. The WS&WR company was unable to fund further construction, and in 1849 the directors decided to sell their line to the GWR.

The GWR's branch to Salisbury from Westbury was completed through the Wylye valley in 1856, with the first section, as far as Warminster, having been opened in 1851.

The route from a junction near Staverton, north of Trowbridge, to Bradford-on-Avon had been constructed in 1848 but the rails were not laid. This branch, via Bradford then along the Avon valley to join the GWR main line at Bathampton, was completed in 1857.

=== Across Salisbury ===
Further work was required at Salisbury to complete the Bristol-Southampton route, as the GWR station was in the west of the city at Fisherton, about 1 mile (1.6 km) away from the earlier LSWR station at Milford on the southeast side. In 1857 the LSWR's West of England line (London-Exeter via Basingstoke and Andover) arrived in northeast Salisbury, at first using the Midford station. In 1859 the LSWR opened a new station at Fisherton, immediately south of the GWR station, to serve two lines: the Andover line, which had been extended across the city, and the new Salisbury and Yeovil Railway towards Exeter. The Milford station was then closed to passengers.

A transit shed was opened between the two Fisherton stations in 1860, to allow goods to be transferred between the GWR's broad gauge wagons and the LSWR's standard gauge. Following the conversion of the GWR to standard gauge in 1874, a connecting siding was built in 1878 to allow shunting of wagons. A direct route for passengers came into use with the inauguration of a Cardiff to Portsmouth service in 1896.

=== 20th century ===
At Salisbury, the LSWR station (which had been expanded in 1878) was further expanded and remodelled, with a large extension to the station building completed in 1902. The GWR station continued to be used by branch services until it was closed to passengers in 1932; it was used as a goods depot until 1991 and is now part of Salisbury Traincare Depot. Milford continued as a major goods depot until 1967.

Westbury station was rebuilt in 1899 to cater for the Stert and Westbury Railway, opened 1900, which now forms part of the Reading–Taunton line.

On the Chippenham branch, the halts at Beanacre and Broughton Gifford closed in 1955. The smaller stations on the Salisbury branch – Heytesbury, Codford, Wylye and Wilton North – closed to passengers in the same year, although in most cases goods service continued into the 1960s. In Hampshire, Nursling station closed in 1957.

Bathampton and Limpley Stoke stations closed in 1966. The same year saw closure of the remaining local stations on the Chippenham branch: Lacock Halt, Melksham, Holt (along with the entire Devizes branch) and Staverton Halt. The section of line between Thingley Jn and Bradford Junction continued to be used by freight trains and occasional passenger trains, such as during engineering works or summer excursions. A regular passenger service was reinstated in 1985 with the reopening of Melksham station.
