= William Coxe (historian) =

English historian & priest (1748–1828)

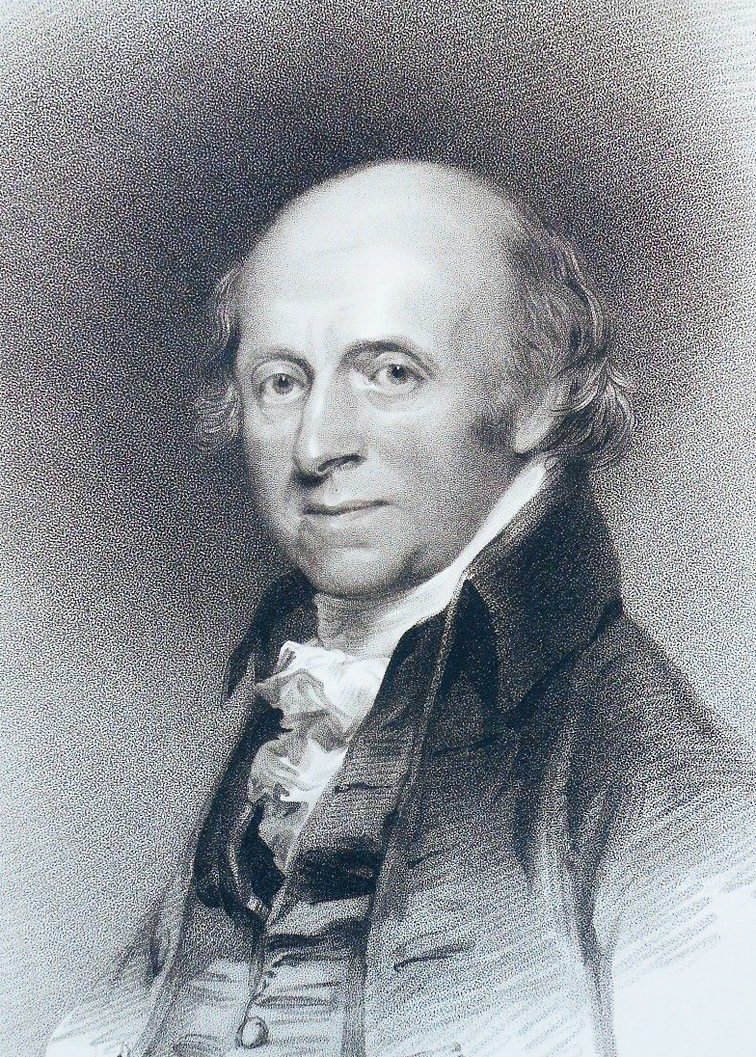
- William Coxe engraving by W. T. Fry, 1904
- Born: 17 March 1748; London, England
- Died: 8 June 1828 (aged 80); Bemerton, England
- Resting place: Fugglestone St Peter, Wilton, England; 51.081524°N 1.855444°W
- Education: St Marylebone (1753–54); Eton College (1754–64); King's College, Cambridge (1765–72)
- Occupations: Historian, archdeacon
- Years active: 1779–1828
- Spouse: Eleanora (née Shairp)
- Father: William Coxe (c. 1710–60)

William Coxe FRS (17 March 1748 [O.S. 6 March 1747] – 8 June 1828) was an English historian and priest who served as a travelling companion and tutor to nobility from 1771 to 1786. He wrote numerous historical works and travel chronicles. Ordained a deacon in 1771, he served as a rector and then archdeacon of Bemerton near Salisbury from 1786 until his death.

== Biography ==
William Coxe was born on 17 March 1748 [O.S. 6 March 1747] in Dover Street, Piccadilly, London, the eldest son of William Coxe (c. 1710 – 1760), a physician to the king's household, and his wife, Martha, daughter of Paul D'Aranda. He was the older brother of the writer and poet Peter Coxe (c. 1753–1844), who wrote the poem "Social Day". Following his father's death in 1760, his mother married John Christopher Smith, who was Handel's amanuensis.

Educated at Marylebone Grammar School (1753–54) and then at Eton College (1754–64), Coxe matriculated to King's College, Cambridge at Easter 1765. He received his BA in 1769, and his MA in 1772. From 1768 to 1771, he was a fellow of King's College. Coxe was ordained a deacon in London on 21 December 1771 and a priest on 15 March 1772.

Coxe travelled throughout Europe as a tutor and travelling companion to various noblemen and gentlemen, including Lord Herbert, son of the Earl of Pembroke; and Samuel Whitbread of the brewing family. He wrote prodigious and detailed accounts of his travels with Lord Herbert around the Swiss and French Alps, which were subsequently published.

In 1786 he was appointed vicar of Kingston upon Thames, and in 1788 rector of Fugglestone St Peter-with-Bemerton, Wiltshire. He also held the rectory of Stourton, Wiltshire from 1801 to 1811 and that of Fovant from 1811 until his death. In 1791 he was made prebendary of Salisbury, and in 1804 Archdeacon of Wilts until his death twenty-four years later at age 80. He died on 8 June 1828 in Bemerton, and was buried in the chancel of St Peter's Church at Fugglestone St Peter. His library was sold from the rectory at Bemerton by London bookseller R. H. Evans, on 11 August 1828 (and four following days). A priced copy of the catalogue, containing many of Coxe's works, is at Cambridge University Library (shelfmark Munby.c.132(13)).

In 1803, Coxe married Eleanora, daughter of William Shairp, consul-general for Russia, and widow of Thomas Yeldham of St Petersburg.

Coxe's literary style featured a detached, unemotional, objective voice that, though typical of the historiography of his day, came to be seen as arch and quaint by later generations.

== Works ==
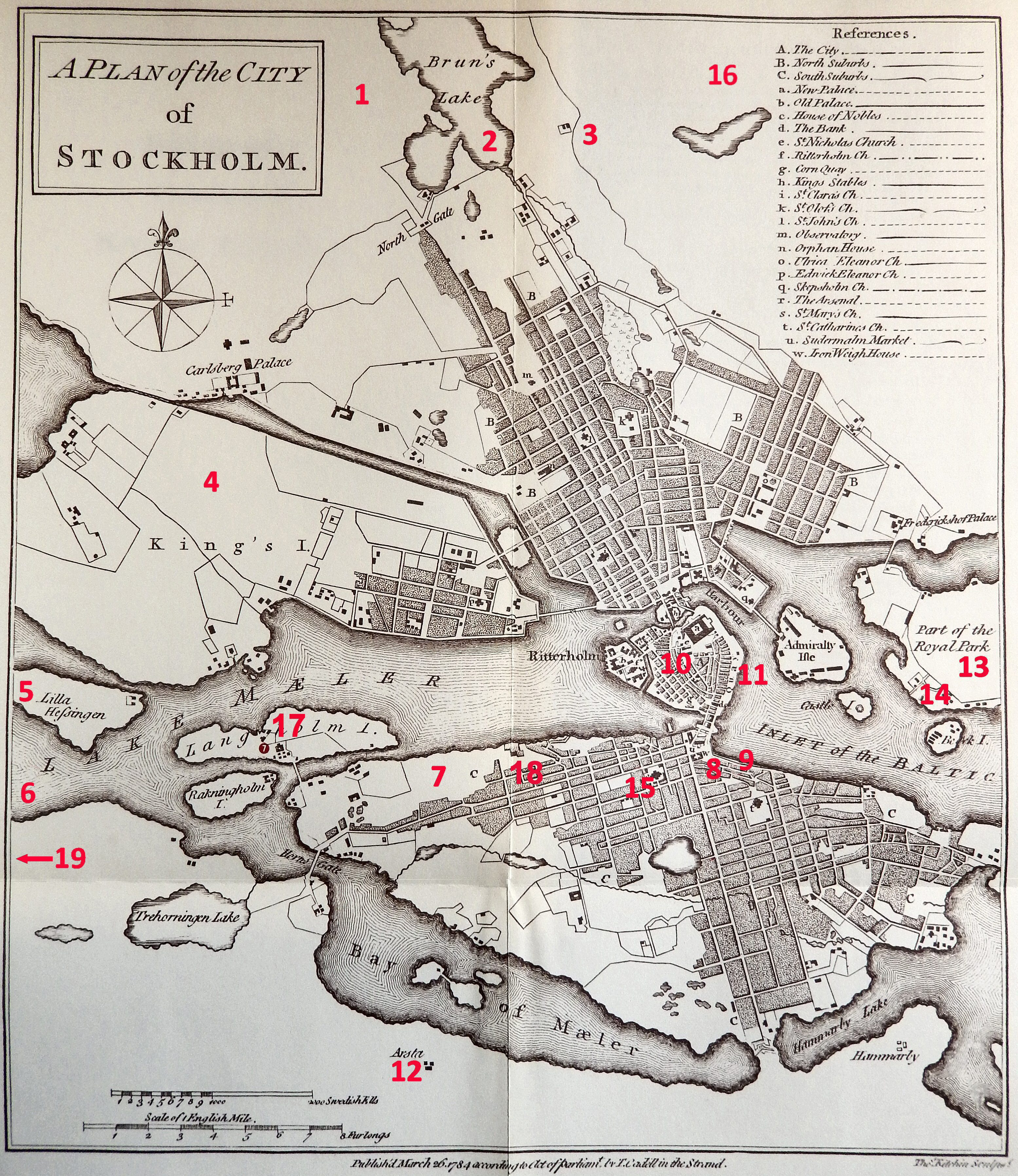
Map of Bellman's Stockholm, places of interest for his Fredman's Epistles and Songs on map from William Coxe's Travels into Poland, Russia, Sweden, and Denmark, 1784. 1 Haga park (S. 64) – 2 Brunnsviken – 3 Första Torpet (Ep. 80) – 4 Kungsholmen – 5 Hessingen (Ep. 48) – 6 Lake Mälaren (Ep. 48) – 7 Södermalm – 8 Urvädersgränd – 9 Lokatten tavern (Ep. 11, Ep. 59, Ep. 77), Bruna Dörren tavern (Ep. 24, Ep. 38) – 10 Gamla stan (Ep. 5, Ep. 9, Ep. 23, Ep. 28, Ep. 79) – 11 Skeppsbron Quay (Ep. 33) – 12 Årsta Castle – 13 Djurgården Park – (Ep. 25, Ep. 51, Ep. 82) – 14 Gröna Lund (Ep. 12, Ep. 62) – 15 Bellman's birthplace – 16 Fiskartorpet (Ep. 71) – 17 Lilla Sjötullen (Bellmanmuseet) (Ep. 48) – 18 Bensvarvars tavern (Ep. 40) 19 Rostock tavern (Ep. 45)

In addition to his travel writing, during his long residence at Bemerton Coxe was mainly occupied in literary work. His publications included:

- Sketches of the Natural, Political and Civil State of Switzerland. London: J Dodsley. 1779.
- Account of Russian Discoveries Between Asia and America. London: Thomas Cadell. 1780.
- Account of Prisons and Hospitals in Russia, Sweden and Denmark. London. 1781.
- Travels into Poland, Russia, Sweden and Denmark. London: Thomas Cadell. 1784.
- Mont Blanc and the Adjacent Alps. London: Thomas Cadell. 1789.
- Travels in Switzerland. London: Printed for T. Cadell, In The Strand. 1789.
- Letter on Secret Tribunals of Westphalia. Salisbury: J Easton. 1796.
- The Life of John Gay. London: Salisbury J Easton. 1797.
- Memoirs of the Life and Administration of Sir Robert Walpole, volumes 1-3. London: Cadell & Davies. 1798.
- William Coxe, ed. (1798). Gay's Fables. London: J. Easton.
- Anecdotes of George Frederick Handel and John Christopher Smith. London: W. Bulmer and Co. 1799.
- An Historical Tour in Monmouthshire. London: Thomas Cadell, Jun., and W. Davies. 1801.
- Memoirs of Horatio, Lord Walpole. London: Longman, Hurst, Rees and Orme. 1802.
- History of the House of Austria. London: Cadell & Davies. 1807.
- Memoirs of the kings of Spain of the House of Bourbon. London: Longman, Hurst, Rees, Orme and Brown. 1813.
- Memoirs of John, Duke of Marlborough. London: Longman, Hurst, Rees, Orme, and Brown. 1818–19.
- Private and Original Correspondence of Charles Talbot, Duke of Shrewsbury. London: Longman, Hurst, Rees, Orme, and Brown. 1821.
- Memoirs of the Administrations of Henry Pelham. London: Longman, Rees, Orme, Brown and Green. 1829.
