= Ernest Geoffrey Parsons =

Commissioner of the Crown Estates

Ernest Geoffrey Parsons CVO CBE (13 May 1901 – 26 August 1991) was a British estate manager who became one of the Commissioners of the Crown Estates for Queen Elizabeth II. He was made a Commander of the Order of the British Empire (CBE), and a Commander of the Royal Victorian Order (CVO) for his services.

Parsons was born in Bristol as the eldest son of Ernest Parsons, a paint manufacturer (Black Friar Paints), and Ellen Mary Hill. His younger brother Dick Parsons was a championship rifle marksman with the British Army, and his cousin Patrick Seager Hill was a clothing manufacturer, and a pioneer and developer of fire protective clothing. He was educated at Clifton College, then later at Cambridge University, where he studied estate management, and became a farmer in the Salisbury, Wiltshire area.

In the 1950s he became the liaison officer for the South Western Division of the Ministry of Agriculture, and for this he was made a Commander of the Order of the British Empire (CBE) in the 1963 Birthday Honours. He was then appointed a Commissioner of the Crown Estates by Queen Elizabeth II, for which he was made a Commander of the Royal Victorian Order (CVO) in the 1973 Birthday Honours. He died on 26 August 1991 in Salisbury, Wiltshire, and is interred at Great Wishford Church, Wiltshire.
