= Wylye railway station =

Former railway station in England

Wylye

General information
- Location: Wylye, Wiltshire; England
- Coordinates: 51.1363°N 1.9894°W
- Platforms: 2

Other information
- Status: Disused

History
- Original company: Great Western Railway
- Post-grouping: Great Western Railway

Key dates
- 30 June 1856: Opened
- 19 September 1955: Closed to passengers
- 2 October 1961: Closed for goods
Location

Wylye railway station is a former railway station in Wylye, Wiltshire, UK, in the Wylye Valley. The station name was spelled "Wiley" by the GWR until 1874. The main building was on the left side of the line when travelling east towards Salisbury with a goods shed east of the platform and a level crossing beyond. Originally single track, the line from the west was doubled in 1900 and onwards towards Salisbury in 1901.

Passenger services were withdrawn on 19 September 1955 but goods traffic continued to be handled until 2 October 1961. The signal box was closed in 1973 when the level crossing was given automatic barriers.

| Preceding station | Historical railways | Following station |
|---|---|---|
| Codford; Line open, station closed | Great Western Railway; Salisbury branch line | Langford; Line open, station closed |
