= Wishford railway station =

Former railway station in England

Wishford
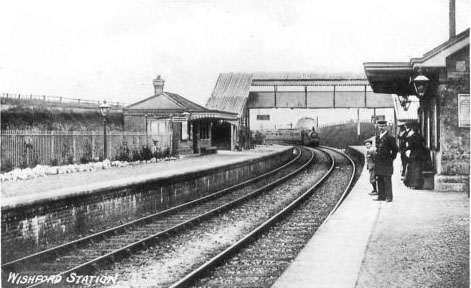
- A postcard of the station from 1910

General information
- Location: Great Wishford, Wiltshire; England
- Platforms: 2

Other information
- Status: Disused

History
- Original company: Great Western Railway
- Post-grouping: Great Western Railway

Key dates
- 30 June 1856: Opened
- 19 September 1955: Closed

Wishford railway station is a former station in Great Wishford, Wiltshire, England, on the GWR's Warminster–Salisbury line.

The single-platform station at opened on 30 June 1856, on the left of trains travelling towards Salisbury. The line was doubled in 1901 and a second platform, reached by a footbridge, was then provided. The station was closed entirely on 19 September 1955 but the station master's house remains as a private residence.

Preceding station	Historical railways	Following station
Langford; Line open, station closed	Great Western Railway; Salisbury branch line	Wilton North; Line open, station closed
