= Army Operational Shooting Competition =

The Army Operational Shooting Competition (AOSC), is the British Army's premier shooting competition. Part of the Defence Operational Shooting Competition (DefOSC), it is based at the National Shooting Centre in Brookwood, Surrey. It also uses Ministry of Defence (MOD) ranges in the vicinity, such as Ash and Pirbright.

== History ==
Competition shooting in the British Army started in 1874 with 'non-central' matches on unit ranges. The 'Army VIII' was formed in the same year, its purpose was to select a team for Inter-Service matches organized by the National Rifle Association (NRA).

The Army Rifle Association (ARA) which was founded in 1893, became the governing body of service shooting. It was formed to encourage interest in service shooting to "promote interest in small arms shooting for service purposes by means of collective competitions, matches being framed to induce practice in methods which le[a]d to increased efficiency on the battlefield". By the 1970s, all three services had established their own competitions and associations, the army's going under the name of 'Regular Army Skill at Arms Meeting' or RASAM, (also known as 'RASAAM' - [Regular Army Skill At Arms Meeting]). As part of constant up-dating, the event's name was changed to the 'Army Operational Shooting Competition' in 2009.

Figure targets were first used in 1908. The electric target range (ETR) came on stream in 1967. A moving target match was introduced in 1974 with two infantry night shooting matches being competed-for initially in 1982. Firing in respirators and a 'march and shoot' competition was introduced in 1986. Casualty recovery and the carrying of 15 kg (33 lb) of personal equipment was brought in 2009.

== Operational Shooting Policy ==
Operational Shooting Policy for the UK Armed Forces has two chapters dedicated in assisting units in the planning and conduct of Operational Shooting Competitions. One chapter contains information and rules on planning considerations, dress and equipment, targets and scoring, penalties, timings and ammunition. The second chapter contains all the details required to plan and conduct the rifle, pistol, machine gun and sniper matches (known formally as Advanced Operational Marksmanship Assessments). Historically, this information was contained in a separate publication known as: Infantry Training, Volume IV, Ranges, Pamphlet No. 20, Competition Shooting or 'Pamphlet 20' for short or informally the 'bible' of competition shooting.

== Prize categories ==
Prizes are awarded to teams and individuals. The most prestigious individual award is the King's Medal.
