= Army Rifle Association =

The Army Rifle Association (ARA) is the British army's shooting advisory and competition organising body. It is a registered charity independent of the chain of command.

== History ==
Competition shooting amongst the Volunteer forces of the Crown was established by the National Rifle Association (NRA) which was founded in 1860, incorporated by Royal Charter in 1894 and registered as a charity in 1963 (No. 219858). In 1874 inter-regimental rifle matches in the Regular Army were introduced and the Army VIII was formed to compete in inter-service matches (organised by the NRA).

The Army Rifle Association (ARA) was founded in 1893 by amalgamating the inter-regimental rifle matches and the Army VIII Club. The object was to promote interest in small arms shooting for service purposes by means of individual and collective competitions, matches being framed to induce practice in methods which led to increased efficiency on the battlefield. It was registered as a charity (No. 227639) in 1967. With the approval of the Charity Commission, the ARA adopted a new Constitution in 2005.

Figure targets were first used in 1908. The electric target range (ETR) came on stream in 1967. A moving target match was introduced in 1974 with two infantry night shooting matches being competed-for initially in 1982. Firing in respirators and a 'march and shoot' competition began in 1986. Casualty recovery and the carrying of 15 kilogrammes of personal equipment was brought-in in 2009.

Target shooting evolved alongside service competition shooting, initially using modified service weapons. The two branches diverged as service shooting competitions more closely reflected operational conditions, and as semi-automatic service rifles were introduced and specialist target firearms became available and permitted by national regulations. The Army SR(b) Club, sponsored by the ARA, was formed in 1957 and was renamed the Army Target Rifle Club in 1968. The Army Target Shooting Club (ATSC), embracing all target shooting disciplines, was formed in 1981; it is a Home Office Approved Club and is a branch of the ARA. Membership of ATSC was extended to members of the Territorial Army (TA) in 2013. The ATSC maintains a clubhouse with accommodation at the National Shooting Centre, Bisley. This building was formerly the ARA Officer's Mess.

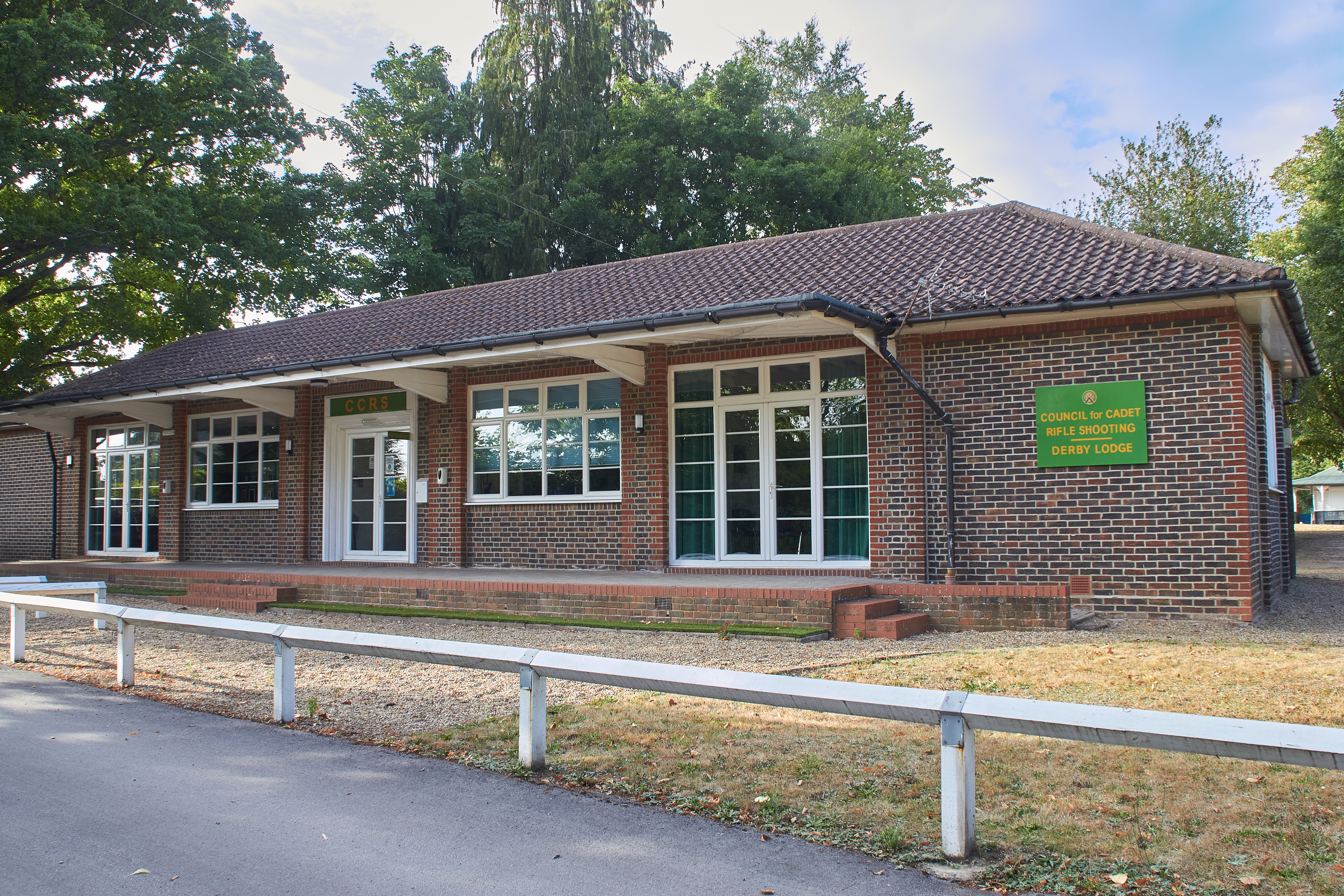
Derby Lodge at the National Shooting Centre. HQ of the Council for Cadet Rifle Shooting (CCRS) and (formerly) TARA

The Territorial Army Rifle Association (TARA) was founded in 1921 and registered as a charity in 1975 (No. 269225). To reflect the renaming of the Territorial Army as the Army Reserve (AR) and the integration of the AR into the Regular Army structure, the ARA Constitution was amended in 2014 to provide for a merger between ARA and TARA to form a “one Army” ARA. The merger was completed in 2016 and TARA was dissolved.

In 2019 the ARA was re-constituted as a Charitable Incorporated Organisation (CIO) (No. 1181714).

== Objects ==
The Objects contained in the ARA's Constitution, which reflect the current spectrum of operations and recent developments in charity law, are:

“To promote military efficiency by encouraging disciplined marksmanship amongst members of the Army, by means of competitions and otherwise”.

The ARA advises the Army's Head of Capability Directorate Combat on the latest civilian shooting techniques and innovations that can be adapted by the Army for operational shooting. It promotes Target Rifle, Small-bore Rifle, Target Pistol and Shotgun (Clay Target) shooting by means of individual and collective competitions, with support from the Army Sport Control Board.

== Operational Competition Shooting ==
Operational competition shooting emphasises the importance of accuracy with Service small arms. It also provides the soldier with an element of excitement and an incentive to achieve success in conditions of tension, comparable in some degree to battle stress. From such experience a soldier gains pride and confidence in his or her ability to handle his or her personal weapon to full effect.

== Target Shooting ==
Target shooting is a recognised Army sport, which, in its various disciplines, develops many of the attributes needed also in service shooting. These include accuracy, concentration under pressure, consistency of technique, allowance for weather conditions and teamwork. Participation in local, national and international target shooting events keeps the Army in touch with developments in shooting techniques and provides units with expert coaches. Since 2015 the target rifle, small-bore and target pistol disciplines have been recognised by the Army and endorsed by the Army Sport Control Board as individual training.

== See also ==
- National Shooting Centre
- Army Operational Shooting Competition
