= Heytesbury railway station =

Former railway station in Wiltshire, England

Heytesbury
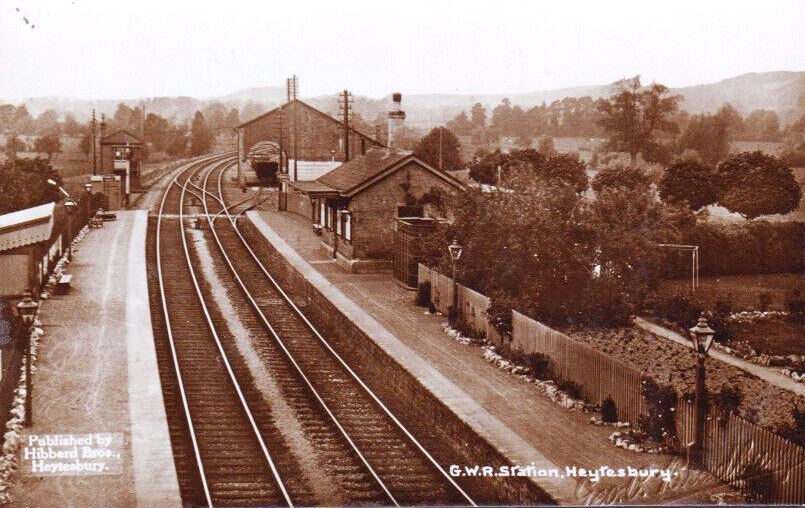
- Heytesbury station (c.1910)

General information
- Location: Heytesbury, Wiltshire, England
- Coordinates: 51.1764°N 2.1114°W
- Platforms: 2

Other information
- Status: Disused

History
- Original company: Great Western Railway
- Post-grouping: Great Western Railway

Key dates
- 30 June 1856: Opened
- 19 September 1955: Closed
Location

Heytesbury railway station served the village of Heytesbury, in Wiltshire, England, between 1856 and 1955. It was a stop on the Salisbury branch line of the Great Western Railway. The station was sited in the Wylye Valley, about 3 miles (5 km) south of Warminster.

== History ==
The station opened on 30 June 1856, on the Salisbury branch line of the Great Western Railway. It was sited next to the bridge carrying the minor road to Tytherington.

Originally a single track, the line was doubled eastwards in 1899 and then westwards to Warminster the following year. The original platform became the one used by trains towards Salisbury and a second was added with a small waiting shelter when the line was doubled, but there was never a footbridge between the two platforms. A goods shed stood on the north side of the line, to the east of the passenger facilities.

A 3.5 miles (5.6 km) branch line from the west end of the station was in use from about 1916 to 1926, to serve a military camp and hospital at Sutton Veny.

The station was closed on 19 September 1955 but the signal box, which was opposite the goods shed, remained open until May 1968.

Preceding station	Historical railways	Following station
Warminster; Line and station open	Great Western Railway; Salisbury branch line	Codford; Line open, station closed

== The site today ==
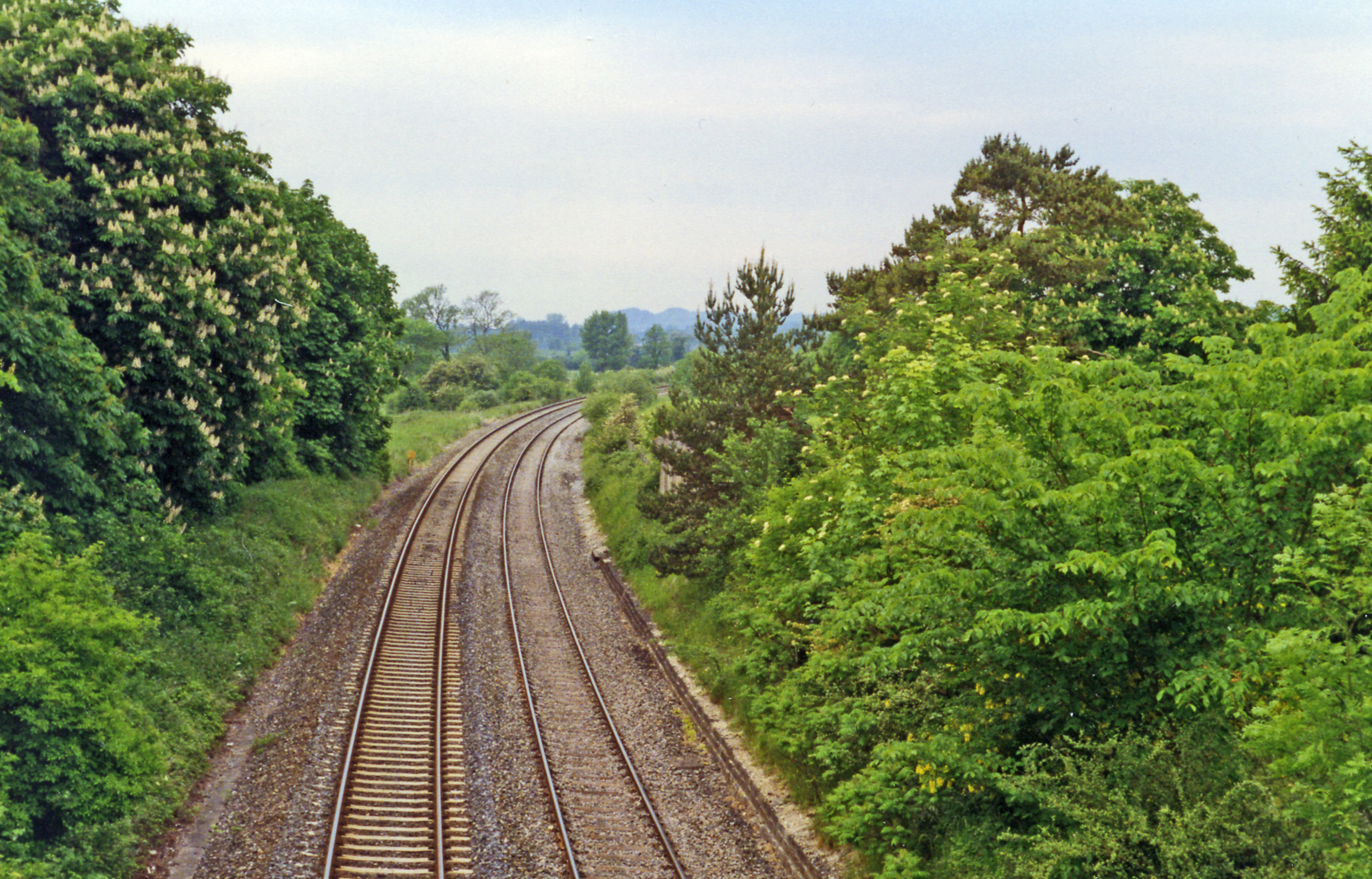
The station site today

The original building is still standing, but the rest of the station was demolished. The line is still open.
