= Dilton Marsh railway station =

Railway station in Wiltshire, England

Dilton Marsh
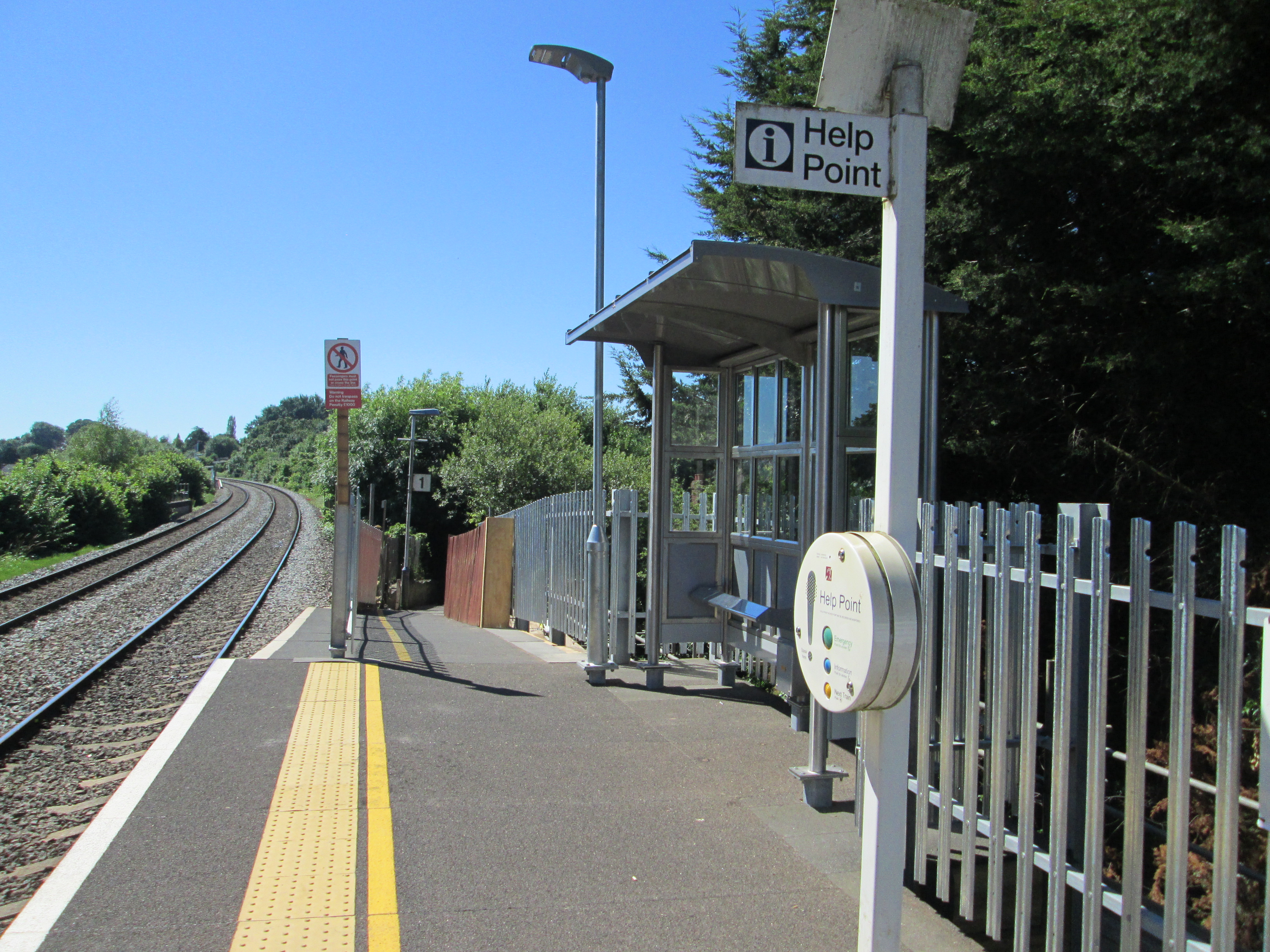

General information
- Location: Dilton Marsh, Wiltshire; England
- Coordinates: 51.2490°N 2.2079°W
- Grid reference: ST855500
- Manager: Great Western Railway
- Platforms: 2

Other information
- Station code: DMH
- Classification: DfT category F2

History
- Original company: Great Western Railway

Key dates
- 1937: Opened

Passengers
- 2021/22: ▲8,666
- 2022/23: ▲12,076
- 2023/24: ▲19,300
- 2024/25: ▲21,574
- 2025/26: ▼20,344
Location
Notes
- Passenger statistics from the Office of Rail and Road

Dilton Marsh railway station serves the village of Dilton Marsh in Wiltshire, England. It is on the Wessex Main Line between Bristol Temple Meads and Southampton Central railway station, 23 miles (37 km) north of Salisbury. Great Western Railway manages the station and operates services between Bristol and the South Coast which call there.

== History ==
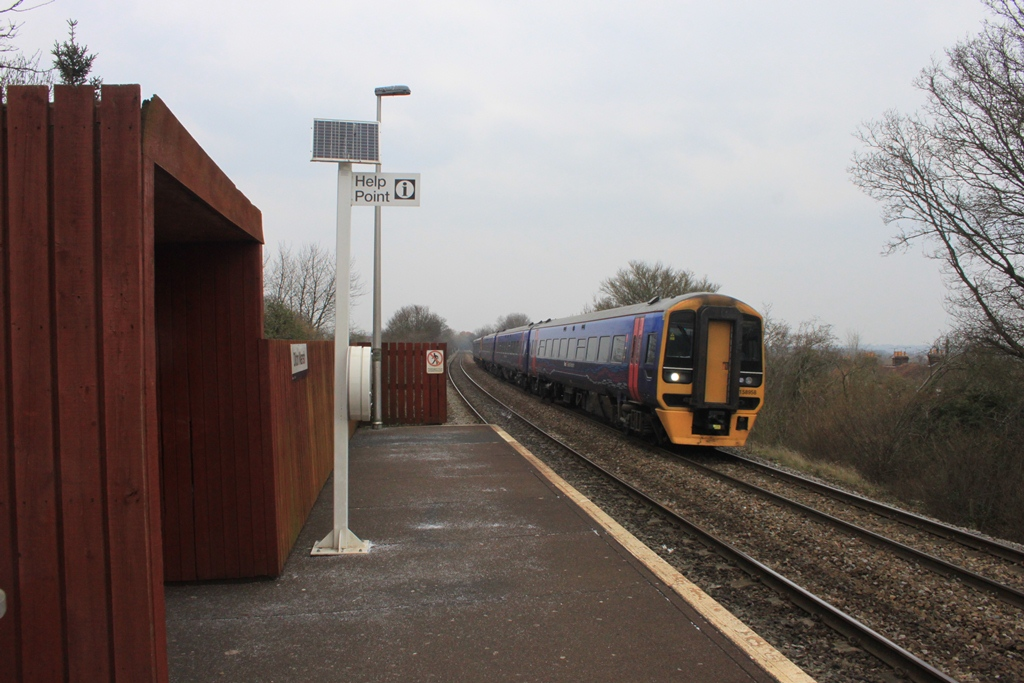
Earlier wooden shelter and fencing, 2013

The Great Western Railway opened the station as Dilton Marsh Halt on 1 June 1937, on a curved embankment next to the bridge where the line crosses the eastern end of Dilton Marsh High Street, on the southwestern outskirts of Westbury. The wooden platforms were 300 feet (91 m) long and were provided with small wooden shelters; construction cost £1,134.

Since it was a halt, there were no staff to sell tickets; instead, a sign directed passengers to the "7th house up the hill", where Mrs H. Roberts sold tickets, on a commission basis, from her home until 1947. The platforms are staggered either side of the road underbridge and are about 100m apart, approached by ramps from either side of the rail bridge.

In 1969 the station was renamed as Dilton Marsh, and the platforms were reduced to the length of one coach. British Rail tried to close the station but was met by strong local opposition. The platforms were in poor condition and so were rebuilt in concrete. The station reopened after an eight-week closure on 1 May 1994. In 2018, the wooden shelters and fencing on both platforms were replaced by standard Network Rail bus-shelter-style shelters in glass and metal with galvanised fencing.

== Services ==
Although it is a request stop, the station is quite well served. In the 2016 timetable, eight trains per day call on weekdays southbound (with an additional service on Saturdays) and eleven northbound. The base frequency is every two hours each way, increasing to hourly at peak times. Destinations include Warminster, Southampton, Bristol Temple Meads, Bath Spa and Gloucester. On Sundays, eight trains call in each direction: these are all through services on the Cardiff and Bristol to Portsmouth route.

Preceding station	National Rail	Following station
Westbury	Great Western Railway; Wessex Main Line	Warminster

== Cultural references ==
The station is the subject of the poem 'Dilton Marsh Halt' by John Betjeman:

Was it worth keeping the Halt open,
We thought as we looked at the sky
Red through the spread of the cedar-tree,
With the evening train gone by?

Yes, we said, for in summer the anglers use it,
Two and sometimes three
Will bring their catches of rods and poles and perches
To Westbury, home for tea.

There isn't a porter. The platform is made of sleepers.
The guard of the last train puts out the light
And high over lorries and cattle the Halt unwinking
Waits through the Wiltshire night.

O housewife safe in the comprehensive churning
Of the Warminster launderette!
O husband down at the depot with car in car-park!
The Halt is waiting yet.

And when all the horrible roads are finally done for,
And there's no more petrol left in the world to burn,
Here to the Halt from Salisbury and from Bristol
Steam trains will return.

== See also ==
- Salisbury branch line (Great Western Railway)
