= Warminster railway station =

Railway station in Wiltshire, England

Warminster
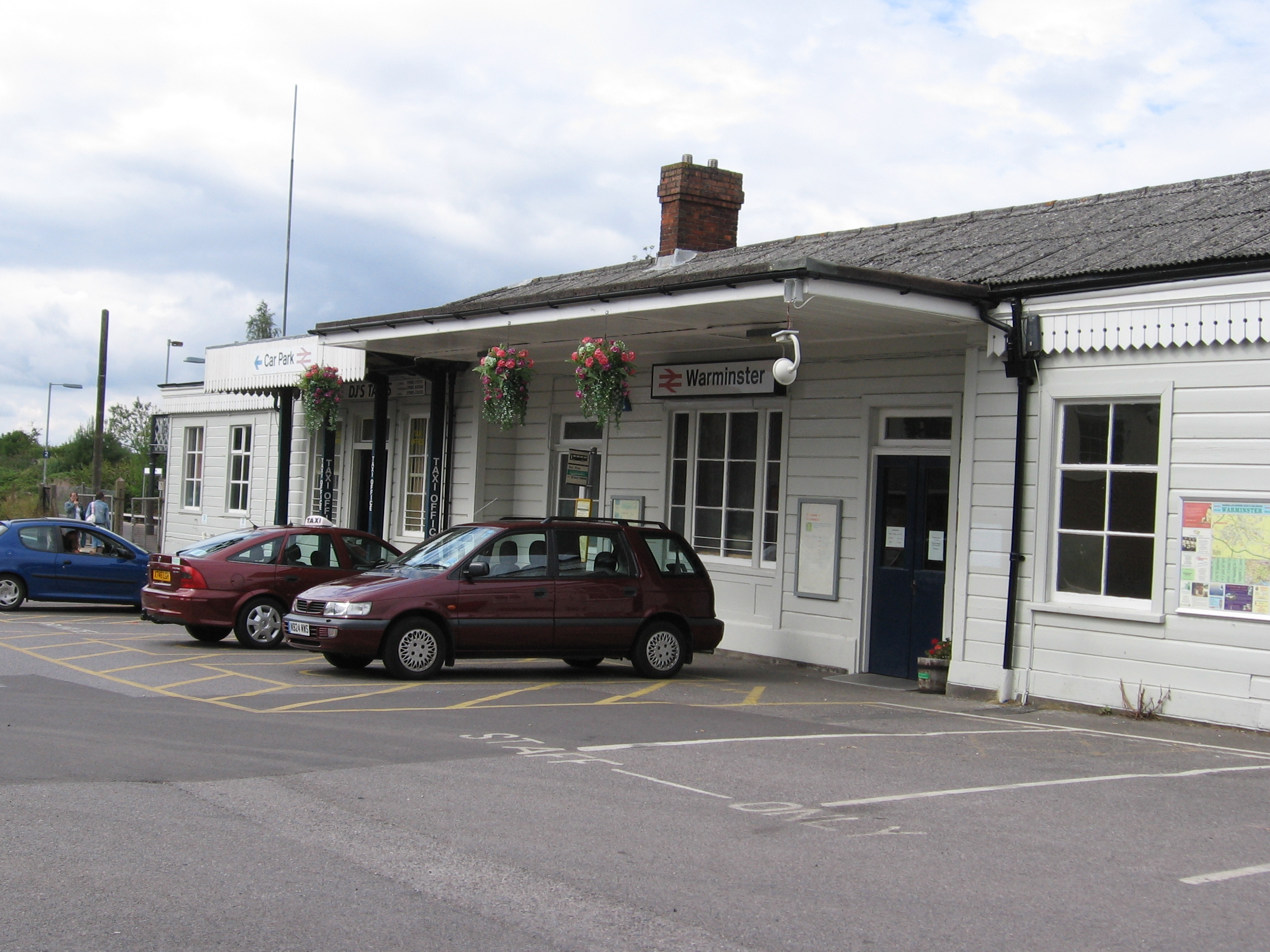

General information
- Location: Warminster, Wiltshire; England
- Coordinates: 51.2069°N 2.1768°W
- Grid reference: ST877453
- Managed by: Great Western Railway
- Platforms: 2

Other information
- Station code: WMN
- Classification: DfT category E

History
- Original company: Great Western Railway

Key dates
- 1851: Line opened from Westbury
- 1856: Line extended to Salisbury

Passengers
- 2020/21: ▼0.103 million
- Interchange: ▼3,463
- 2021/22: ▲0.284 million
- Interchange: ▲11,747
- 2022/23: ▲0.295 million
- Interchange: ▲12,008
- 2023/24: ▲0.332 million
- Interchange: ▲16,092
- 2024/25: ▲0.356 million
- Interchange: ▲17,188
Location
Notes
- Passenger statistics from the Office of Rail and Road

Warminster railway station serves the historic market town of Warminster in Wiltshire, England.

The station is operated by Great Western Railway and is a main station on the Wessex Main Line, with regular services to Bristol, Cardiff, Southampton and Portsmouth.

== History ==
The station was opened by the Great Western Railway on 9 September 1851 as the terminus of its branch from Westbury on its Wilts, Somerset and Weymouth route. The branch was extended to Salisbury on 30 June 1856. The station was originally provided with a train shed covering the tracks and platforms, but this was removed around 1930 when the current canopies were erected in its place. The original wooden buildings were retained and are still in use today.

== Services ==
Great Western Railway operate a generally hourly service in each direction from the station, westbound to Westbury, Bristol Temple Meads and Cardiff Central, and eastbound to Southampton Central and Portsmouth Harbour. A few additional GWR trains call at certain hours (some of which either originate or terminate here).

Preceding station	National Rail	Following station
Dilton Marsh	Great Western Railway; Wessex Main Line	Salisbury
Westbury	South Western Railway; Wessex Main Line	Salisbury
	Historical railways	
Dilton Marsh; Line and station open	Great Western Railway; Wessex Main Line	Heytesbury; Line open, station closed

== Connections ==
Once a year, a bus service (colloquially known as route 23A) runs from Warminster station to the uninhabited village of Imber.
