= Salisbury branch line (Great Western Railway) =

Railway line in Wiltshire, England

The Salisbury branch line of the Great Western Railway from Westbury to Salisbury in Wiltshire, England, was completed in 1856. Most of the smaller stations were closed in 1955 but the line remains in use as part of the Wessex Main Line.

== History ==
=== Wilts and Somerset Railway ===
In 1844 the Great Western Railway (GWR) and the London and South Western Railway (LSWR) were engaged in a struggle to secure territory, known as the gauge war: the GWR lines were 7 ft 1/4 in (2,140 mm) broad gauge and the LSWR were 4 ft 8 1/2 in (1,435 mm) standard gauge, sometimes called "narrow gauge" for contrast. When the LSWR proposed a new line from Basingstoke to Newbury and Swindon, the GWR sought to fend it off with their own proposal, a branch line from their main line at Thingley Junction, west of Chippenham, to Salisbury. In this period the government's policy was that any general area could only support one railway line, and a commission appointed by the Board of Trade would appraise rival proposals and determine which should be permitted. In this case the GWR's scheme won by decision in December 1844.

The Wilts and Somerset Railway company was formed; nominally independent but heavily supported by the GWR. It planned to make a line from Thingley to Salisbury with branches to Devizes, Bradford on Avon, Frome and Radstock. It was to have capital of £650,000 and this would be secured on a guarantee by the GWR, which was to subscribe half the capital and to lease and work the line.

To join with other friendly railways, the plans for the Wilts and Somerset line were extended to reach Weymouth via Yeovil, and the company was now to be called the Wilts, Somerset and Weymouth Railway.

=== Wilts, Somerset and Weymouth Railway ===
The Wilts, Somerset and Weymouth Railway obtained its authorising Act of Parliament on 30 June 1845. The simple scheme to connect Thingley and Salisbury was now to cost £1.5 million, and branches were to be built to Weymouth, Devizes, Bradford on Avon, Radstock, Sherborne and Bridport in addition; a total of 148 miles (238 km) of railway. The company proceeded with building the Thingley to Westbury section, and this opened to the public on 5 September 1848. From the summer of 1847 the reaction to the railway mania had set in and it became almost impossible to obtain money for railway projects. Construction of the Westbury to Warminster section started in March 1850, but the company was already running out of money, and in October 1849 the decision had been taken to sell the railway to the GWR; this took legal effect on 3 July 1851.

=== Completion by the GWR ===
The GWR had quickly initiated the construction between Westbury and Warminster, and this opened with a ceremony on 9 September 1851. The onward line to Salisbury lay across thinly populated territory, and the GWR pressed ahead with other priorities at first, but the authorising Act of Parliament (inherited by the GWR) did not merely permit the construction but required it. Local interests were frustrated at the lack of progress towards Salisbury, as well as other routes of the original Wilts, Somerset and Weymouth scheme. A writ of mandamus was obtained at the Queen's Bench for the line from Bradford on Avon to Bathampton, and the GWR applied for an extension of time and certain other powers to complete the lines. This was granted, but on the condition that GWR dividends would be stopped if the construction was not swiftly completed. In the face of this the GWR proceeded quickly; there were no great engineering difficulties, and the line from Warminster to Salisbury opened to mineral traffic on 11 June 1856, and to passengers on 30 June 1856. It was a single-track broad-gauge line, with an intermediate crossing loop at Wiley (later renamed Wylye); crossing facilities were provided at Wilton in 1867. The line was worked by single-needle electric telegraph.

The stations at opening were:

- Warminster (the terminus from 1851 to 1856)
- Heytesbury
- Codford
- Wiley (renamed Wylye in 1874)
- Langford (closed in October 1857)
- Wishford
- Wilton
- Salisbury (Fisherton Street, west of the city centre)

The Salisbury station had an all-over roof with two platform lines and two centre carriage sidings. The LSWR station at Salisbury was located at Milford, some distance away on the southeastern edge of the city.

=== LSWR draws alongside at Salisbury ===
The LSWR line to Salisbury had been a branch from Bishopstoke (Eastleigh) via Romsey, but they were building a direct line from Basingstoke via Andover. This opened on 1 May 1857 still serving the Milford terminus, but their line was extended to a new station alongside the GWR building at Fisherton Street on 2 May 1859; on the same day the Salisbury and Yeovil Railway, friendly to the LSWR, opened its line using the LSWR station at Salisbury. It was now clear that this was to be the route to the West of England for the LSWR and its allies. The Salisbury and Yeovil route followed alongside the GWR line as far as Wilton, where they had their own station.

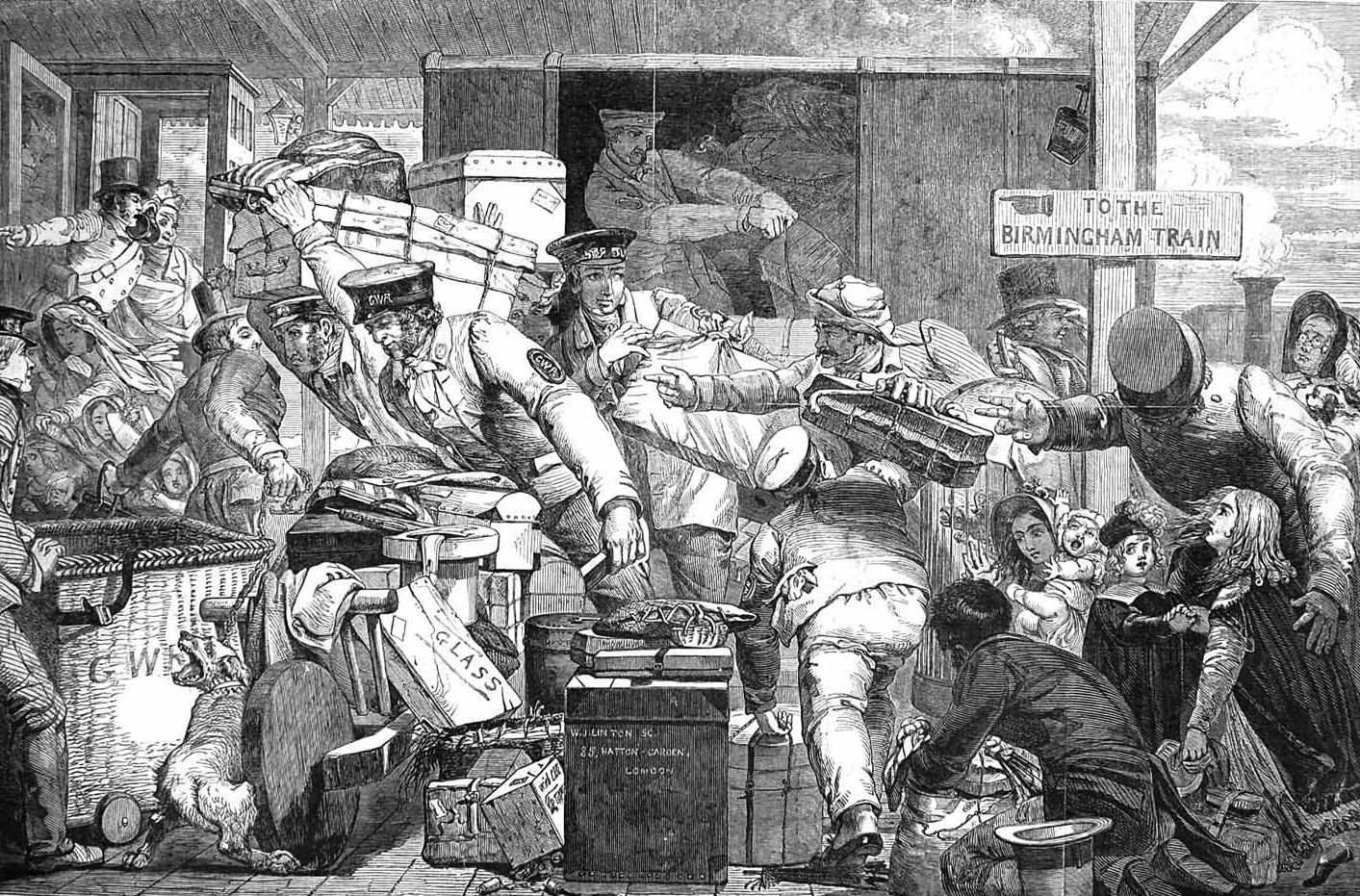
In the transfer shed at Gloucester

The GWR and the LSWR lines used different track gauges, and a transfer shed was built between the routes; it was provided with a siding for each gauge, and goods were unloaded from one wagon and transferred to another for onward transit. This was a considerable inconvenience. A covered footbridge was provided between the two railways' stations for passengers to change trains.

=== Gauge conversion and other infrastructure changes ===
The line (and other associated lines in the area) was converted to 4 ft 8 1/2 in (1,435 mm) standard gauge in a massive operation, starting on 16 June 1874. The track was on longitudinal sleepers at this time. All broad gauge stock was returned to Swindon on 18 June, with the line reopening for a limited service on the standard gauge on 21 June and full normal services resuming from 25 June.

An exchange siding was provided at Salisbury, where the transshipment shed was no longer required, but for the time being no through running took place.

Wiley station was renamed Wylye from August 1874; a crossing loop was provided at Heytesbury in 1898.

Double track had been installed between Westbury and Warminster in May 1875; the remainder of the route followed at the turn of the century:

- Warminster to Heytesbury – October 1900
- Heytesbury to Codford – 1899
- Codford to Wylye – 13 January 1900
- Wylye to Wishford – 3 March 1901
- Wishford to Wilton – 28 April 1901
- Wilton to Salisbury – 1 July 1896

The Salisbury and Yeovil Railway ran alongside the GWR line from Wilton in to Salisbury. That arrangement was rationalised from 28 October 1973 when a junction was installed at the route divergence just east of the Wilton stations, and only the ex-S&YR tracks remained from there to Salisbury.

== Nationalisation ==
The main line railways of Great Britain came under national ownership on 1 January 1948, pursuant to the Transport Act 1947; the line became a part of the Western Region of British Railways.

The former GWR engine shed at Salisbury was closed on 26 November 1950.

Local trains on the line were withdrawn on 19 September 1955 and all the stations between Warminster and Salisbury closed, leaving only Dilton Marsh and Warminster open for passengers. On privatisation of British Rail in the 1990s, passenger train services were provided under the Wales & West franchise, later becoming Wessex Trains before being transferred to First Great Western. Most passenger trains using the route today operate between Cardiff Central and Portsmouth Harbour.

== Stations ==
=== Dilton Marsh Halt ===
Opened on 1 June 1937, the halt had staggered timber-built platforms. It was unstaffed, and tickets were sold from a nearby cottage. In British Railways days a notice at the entrance read: 'British Railways: Dilton Marsh Halt Will passengers please obtain tickets from Mrs. H. Roberts, "Holmdale", 7th house up the hill.'

The platforms were shortened to one coach length in 1969. It is not far from Westbury station, and was proposed for closure in the 1990s, but there was strong opposition locally. It was closed for reconstruction from 5 March to 30 April 1994 at a cost of £180,000; calling trains use selective door operation. Residential building in Westbury has now enveloped the station area.

There was a break-section signal box at Upton Scudamore, between Dilton Marsh and Warminster, from 1900 to 1964.

=== Warminster ===
Opened as the terminus of the branch on 9 September 1851, Warminster station became a through station on 30 June 1856 when the line was completed to Salisbury. It originally had a train shed covering the tracks; the main offices were built of wood on the northbound platform. The station was rebuilt with ordinary canopies in the 1930s but the wooden buildings remain in use.

Goods traffic was significant with a banana packing factory (operated by Geest, and served by trains from Southampton and Avonmouth docks), and Air Ministry and Royal Engineers depots were rail served. Ordinary goods traffic was withdrawn in 1973.

=== Heytesbury ===
The station originally had a single platform; a second was added with a small waiting shelter when the line was doubled but there was never a footbridge between the two platforms. A goods shed was situated on the north side of the line to the east of the passenger facilities.

A 3 1/2-mile (5.6 km) branch line from the northwest end of the station was in use from about 1916 to 1926 to serve the military camp and hospital at Sutton Veny.

The station closed on 19 September 1955 but the signal box, which was opposite the goods shed, remained open until May 1968. The original station building was still standing in 2004.

=== Codford ===
This station lost its passenger service on 19 September 1955 and its goods yard was closed on 10 June 1963. The signal box remained in use until June 1982.

The original single platform was built on the north side of the line next to a level crossing. A passing loop and second platform were installed in 1897. A 2 3/4-mile (4.4 km) branch line—the Codford Camp Railway—was in use from 1914 to 1922 to serve several army camps northeast of the main line.

=== Wylye ===
The line runs through the Wylye valley; the station was called Wiley until renamed in August 1874. The main building was on the left side of the line when travelling east towards Salisbury with a goods shed east of the platform and a level crossing beyond.

Passenger services were withdrawn on 19 September 1955 but goods traffic continued to be handled until 2 October 1961. The signal box was closed in 1973 when the level crossing was converted to automatic barrier operation.

=== Langford ===
This station was only in use from 30 June 1856 until October 1857. It served the settlements around Hanging Langford.

=== Wishford ===
The single platform station at Great Wishford was opened on 30 June 1856, on the left of trains travelling towards Salisbury. The line was doubled in 1901 and a second platform was then provided. The station was closed entirely on 19 September 1955 but the station master's house was still occupied in 2004.

=== Wilton North ===
Wilton station opened with the line on 30 June 1856; it had a single platform on the left of trains heading towards Westbury. A second platform was added when the line was doubled in 1896.

When the Salisbury and Yeovil Railway opened its main line in 1859, it provided its own Wilton station a short distance to the south. After nationalisation, it was necessary to give the stations distinct names, and the former GWR station was named Wilton North from 26 September 1949; the former S&YR station was named Wilton South. In common with other stations on the line, Wilton North was closed on 19 September 1955, but Wilton South remained open for passengers until 1966. Wilton North remained open for goods traffic until 6 September 1965 and the goods shed remained intact and used as a shop in 2004.

=== Salisbury ===
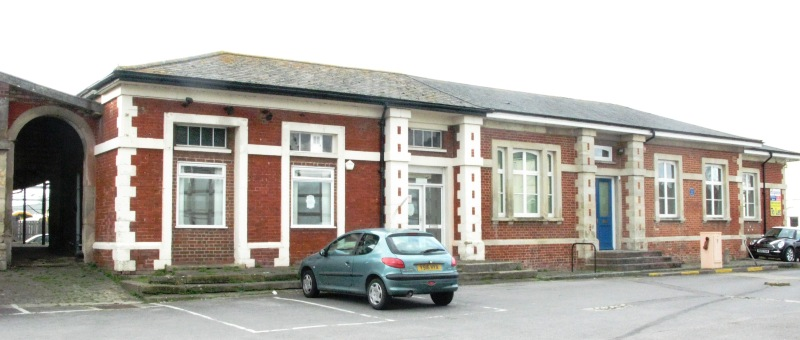
Salisbury GWR station building

The GWR station at Salisbury was opened at Fisherton Street on 30 June 1856. Isambard Kingdom Brunel designed a brick-built terminal with a train shed to cover the tracks. After opening of the LSWR station alongside, a footbridge was opened in 1860 for passengers to change between the two stations.

The GWR converted their line to standard gauge in 1874 and after this a connecting line was laid between the two railways. In September 1932 the GWR's passenger trains were transferred to the LSWR station. The GWR station remained in use until about 1991 and the sidings were latterly used as the base for a company operating exhibition trains. The sidings were then redeveloped as Salisbury traction maintenance depot where South Western Railway maintains its diesel multiple unit fleet.

The original Brunel terminal buildings have been listed and were in use as offices by non-railway businesses.
