= Westbury railway station =

Railway station in Wiltshire, England

Westbury
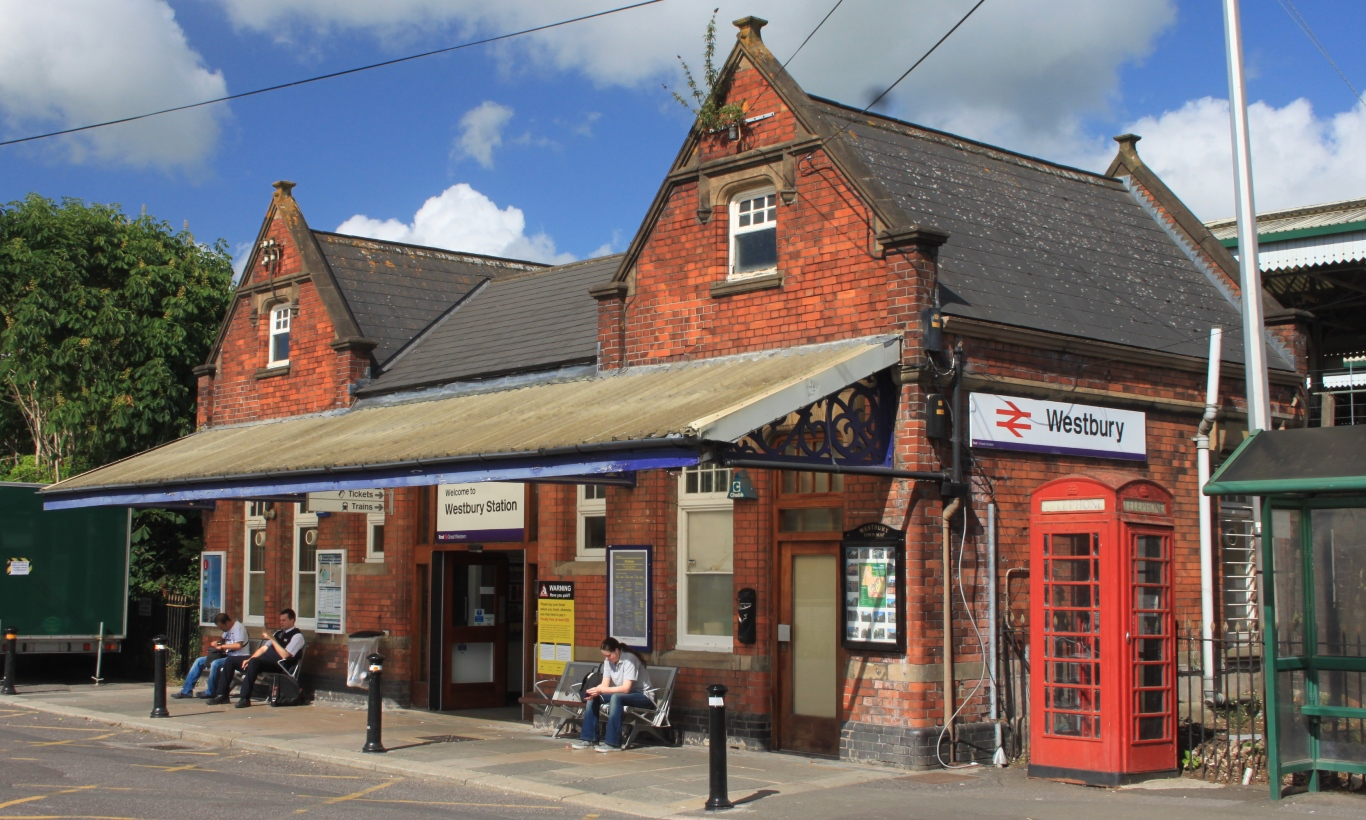
- The entrance to the station is at ground level, with the platforms behind and above

General information
- Location: Westbury, Wiltshire; England
- Coordinates: 51.2665°N 2.1995°W
- Grid reference: ST861519
- Manager: Great Western Railway
- Platforms: 3

Other information
- Station code: WSB
- Classification: DfT category D

History
- Original company: Wilts, Somerset and Weymouth Railway
- Pre-grouping: Great Western Railway
- Post-grouping: Great Western Railway

Key dates
- 5 September 1848: Station opened as terminus of line from Chippenham
- 7 October 1850: Line extended to Frome

Passengers
- 2021/22: ▲0.439 million
- Interchange: ▲0.164 million
- 2022/23: ▲0.519 million
- Interchange: ▲0.247 million
- 2023/24: ▲0.536 million
- Interchange: ▲0.252 million
- 2024/25: ▲0.543 million
- Interchange: ▲0.264 million
- 2025/26: ▲0.627 million
- Interchange: ▲0.292 million
Location
Notes
- Passenger statistics from the Office of Rail and Road

Westbury railway station serves the market town of Westbury, in Wiltshire, England. The station is managed by Great Western Railway.

The station is a major junction, serving the Reading to Taunton line with services to and from Penzance and London Paddington; the Wessex Main Line with services to and from Cardiff and Portsmouth, also Swindon; the Heart of Wessex Line with local services from Bristol Temple Meads to Weymouth; and services to London Waterloo.

== History ==
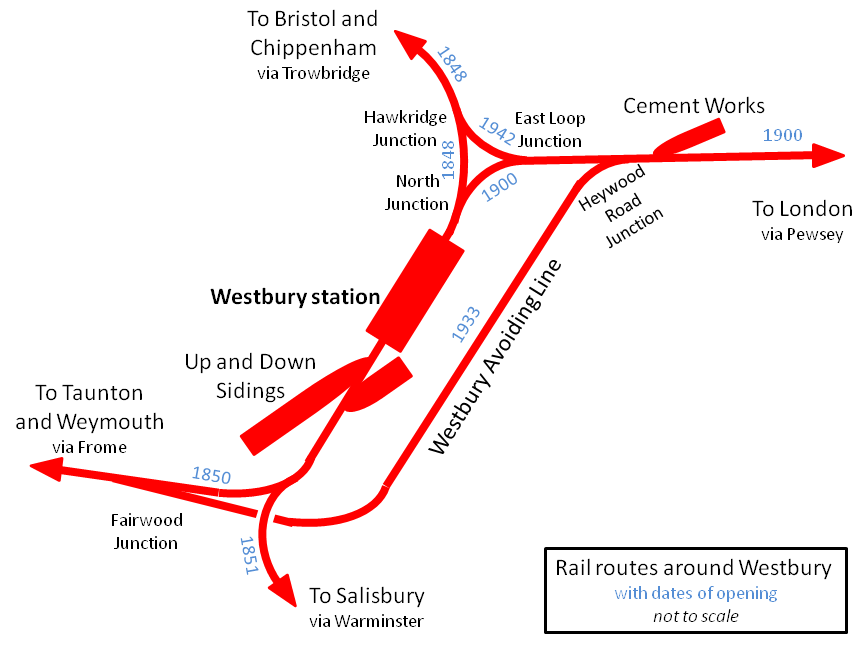
Railway routes around Westbury in 2009

The station was opened by the Wilts, Somerset and Weymouth Railway on 5 September 1848 and was the initial terminus of their line from Chippenham. This line was later extended to Frome, which opened on 7 October 1850. The Salisbury branch opened on 30 June 1856, whilst the opening of the line to Patney & Chirton in 1900 (along with that further west from Castle Cary to Cogload Junction six years later) completed the GWR's new main line from London Paddington to Taunton and beyond.

In the 1880s, the station was one of the meeting places of the South and West Wilts Hunt.

In 1899, Westbury station was entirely rebuilt to cater for the 1900 line, creating two island platforms six hundred feet long and forty feet wide. It has since been rebuilt and remodelled several times, most recently when the area was resignalled in 1985 (when the Down Salisbury platform line was lifted), but without changing the underlying form created in 1901. In 2013 the Swindon and Wiltshire Local Transport Body prioritised the reopening of this platform face at an estimated cost of £5.4m.

A freight yard next to the station is used by bulk limestone trains from the rail-served quarries at Merehead and Whatley in Somerset. In April 2009, the rail-served Lafarge cement works to the east was closed.

=== Accidents and incidents ===
On 28 October 1873, a mail train passed a signal at danger and collided with a luggage train.

On 6 December 2011, a train was derailed at Westbury.

== Facilities ==
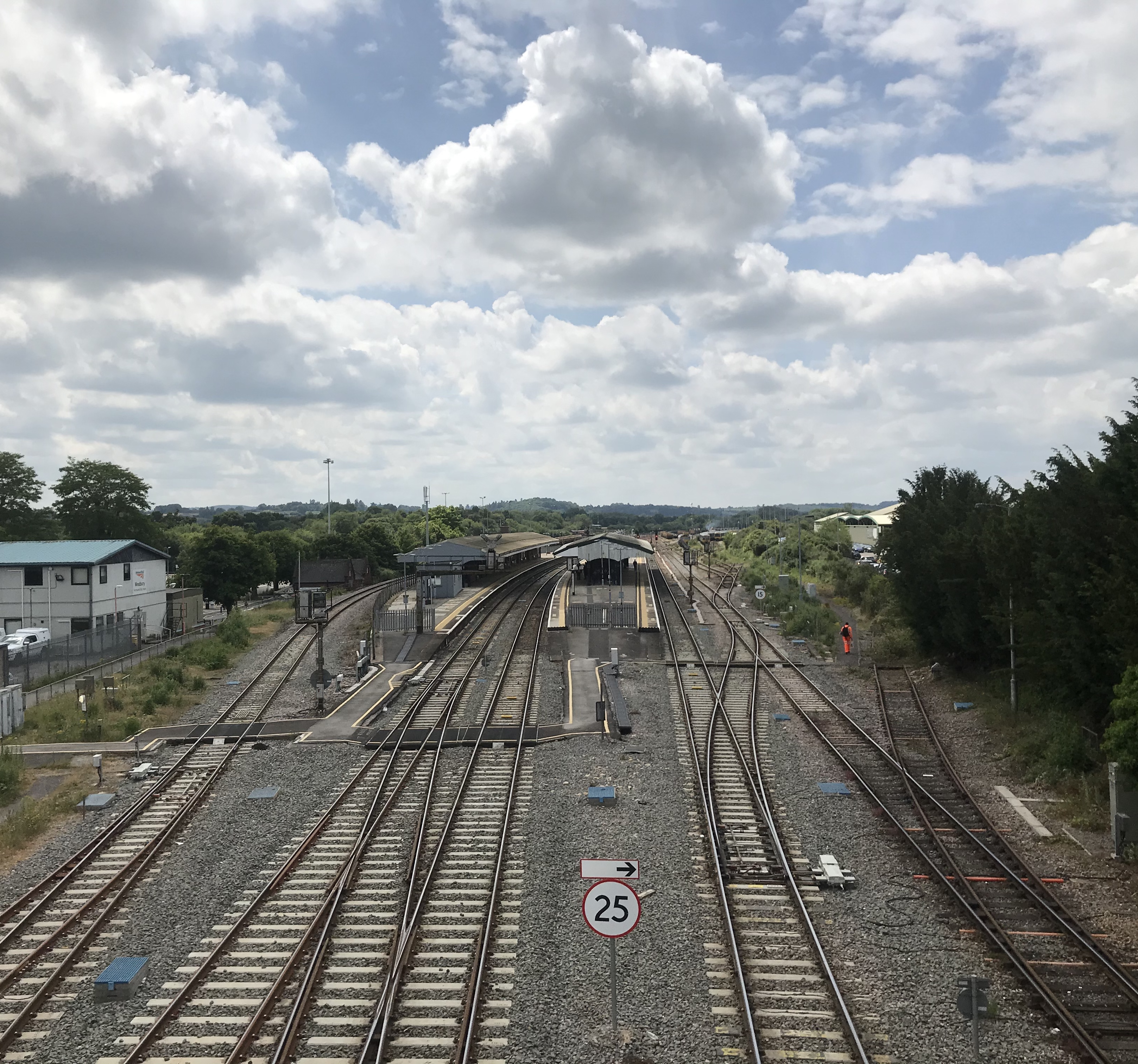
View of the station

The buffet at Westbury appeared in a list of highly commended station cafes published in The Guardian in 2009.

== Services ==
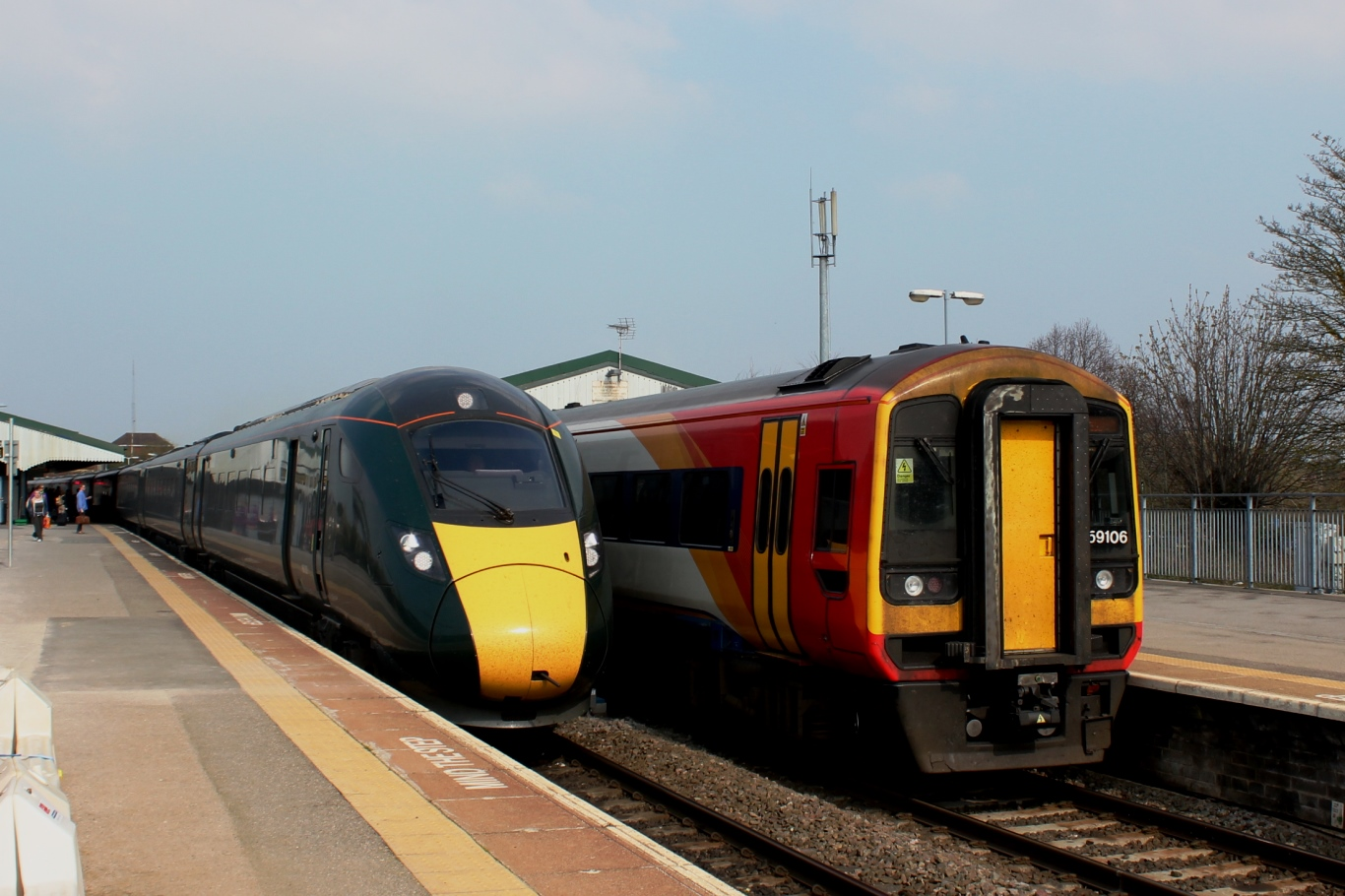
A Great Western Railway Class 800 from London Paddington and a South Western Railway Class 159 going to London Waterloo

The station is served by all three main routes that pass through it:

- Reading to Taunton Line: the station is served by westbound trains to one of Exeter St Davids, Paignton, Plymouth, or Penzance; eastbound services go to London Paddington, which depart approximately once every two hours.
- Wessex Main Line: Services between Cardiff Central, Southampton Central and Portsmouth Harbour, with a separate service between Gloucester, Bristol and Westbury. Some of these trains continue through to Weymouth and in the opposite direction certain trains extend through to Cheltenham Spa and Great Malvern. Others run to Frome, Warminster and Southampton.
- TransWilts Line: this line hosts services between Westbury and Swindon, via Chippenham, Trowbridge and Melksham.

Preceding station	National Rail	Following station
Pewsey	Great Western Railway (London to Devon and Cornwall)	Castle Cary
Trowbridge	Great Western Railway (Wessex Main Line)	Dilton Marsh or Warminster
Trowbridge	Great Western Railway (Heart of Wessex Line)	Frome
Warminster	South Western Railway (Basingstoke - Yeovil)	Frome

== Future ==
The line to Westbury is not due to be electrified as part of the 21st-century modernisation of the Great Western Main Line. Although local councillors support it, the extension of electrification beyond Newbury to Westbury was assessed as having a benefit–cost ratio of only 0.31.
