= Frome railway station =

Railway station in Somerset, England

Frome
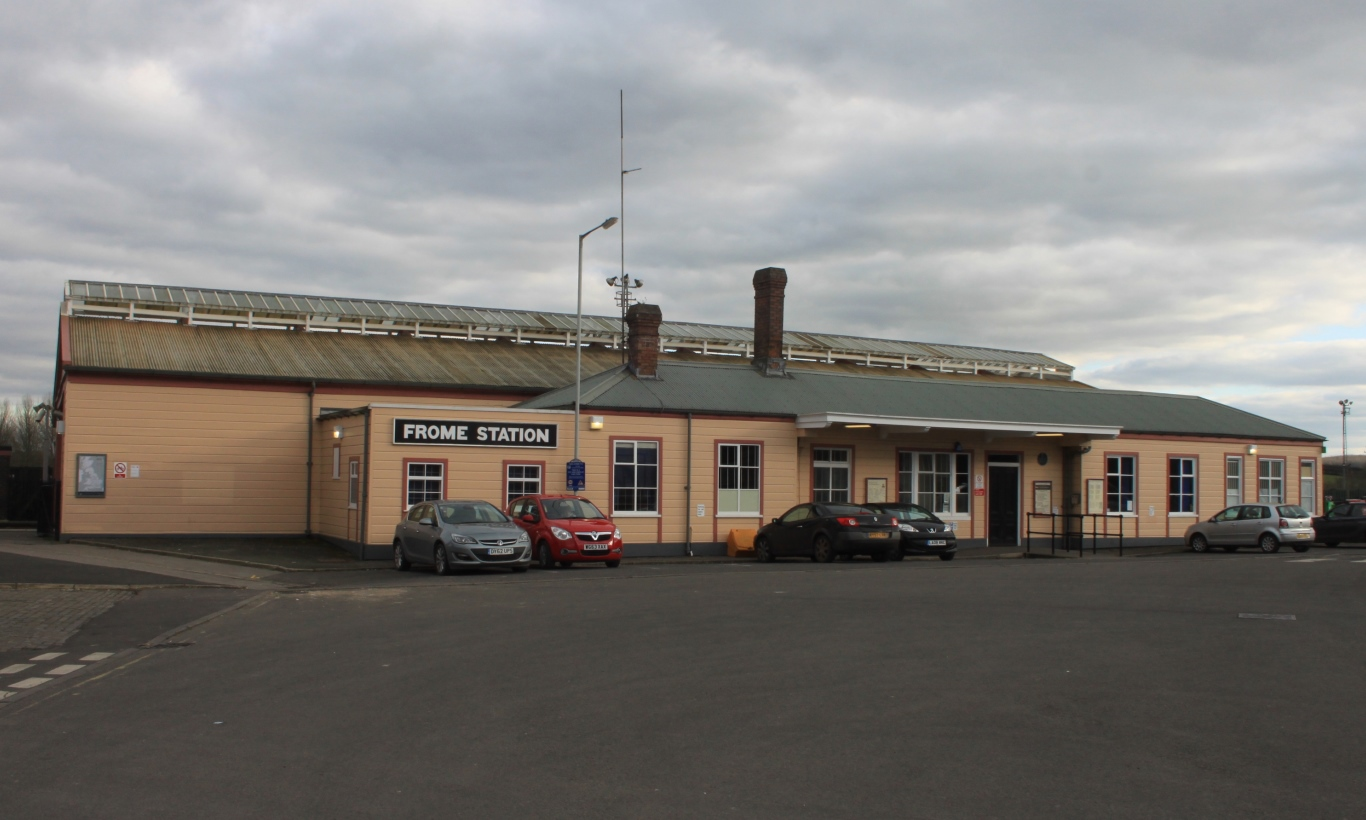

General information
- Location: Frome, Somerset; England
- Coordinates: 51.2263°N 2.3107°W
- Grid reference: ST784476
- Managed by: Great Western Railway
- Platforms: 1

Other information
- Station code: FRO
- Classification: DfT category D

History
- Original company: Great Western Railway

Key dates
- 7 October 1850: Opened

Passengers
- 2020/21: ▼47,914
- Interchange: ▼194
- 2021/22: ▲0.166 million
- Interchange: ▲719
- 2022/23: ▲0.207 million
- Interchange: ▼394
- 2023/24: ▲0.255 million
- Interchange: ▲1,899
- 2024/25: ▲0.288 million
- Interchange: ▼101
Location
Notes
- Passenger statistics from the Office of Rail and Road

Frome railway station serves the town of Frome and a largely rural area of the county of Somerset in England. The station is 22.25 miles (36 km) south of Bath Spa on the Bristol to Weymouth line, it is owned by Network Rail and is managed by Great Western Railway.

The station is located on a 1.5 miles (2.4 km) long branch line which loops off the main line railway, which carries services on both the Reading to Taunton line and Bristol to Weymouth route. Most of the trains which take the loop line in order to serve Frome station are on the Bristol to Weymouth route, and most trains on the Reading to Taunton line by-pass the station on the main line.

== History ==
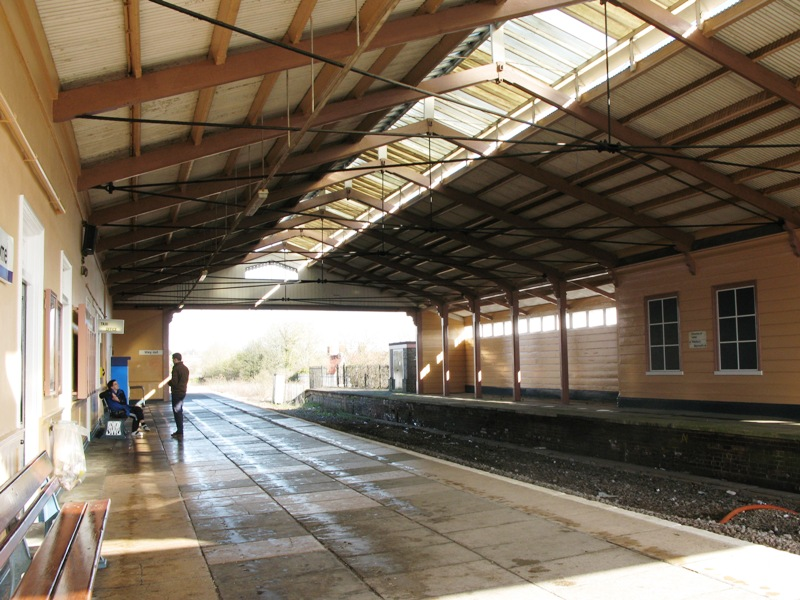
Inside the train shed

Frome station was designed by J R Hannaford, and is one of the oldest through train shed railway stations still in operation in Britain. The unusual station structure consists of a 120 by 48 foot (36.5 x 14.6 metres) timber train shed, supported by 12 composite trusses with a span of 49 feet (15 m). The station has two platforms, one of which is now unused due to the line being made into a single track. It is now a Grade II listed building.

The station was originally on the Wilts, Somerset and Weymouth Railway, a railway that linked the Great Western Railway (GWR) at Chippenham with Weymouth. The line was authorised by the Wilts, Somerset and Weymouth Railway Act 1845 (8 & 9 Vict. c. liii), was acquired by the GWR in 1850, reached Frome in the same year (with the station opening on 7 October), and was completed throughout in 1857. The original route of this line is that of the loop line through Frome station, which now forms the basis for today's Bristol to Weymouth route.

A branch from Frome, authorised by the same 1845 act, opened to freight traffic in 1854, originally as a broad gauge mineral line to Radstock with a station at Mells Junction (renamed Mells Road in 1898). It was converted to standard gauge in 1874 and opened to passenger traffic in 1875. At Radstock this line connected with the Bristol and North Somerset Railway, providing a more direct route to Bristol than that provided by the Wilts, Somerset and Weymouth Railway. Sidings were created in Frome to service local industry: in the 1870s for the Cockey gasworks at Welshmill and the cattlemarket in the town centre, and then in the 1890s for the Cockey engineering works in Garston.

For the remainder of the 19th century, the GWR's principal route from London Paddington station to Exeter, Plymouth and Penzance was an indirect one via Bristol Temple Meads (the so-called Great Way Round). However, in 1895 the GWR announced that new lines were to be constructed to enable trains to reach Exeter, Plymouth and Penzance in a shorter time. This involved improvements to the Berks and Hants Extension Railway and the Wilts, Somerset and Weymouth Line, together with the construction of the Castle Cary Cut-Off, which was opened from Castle Cary to the existing Bristol to Exeter line at Cogload Junction in 1906. This transformed Frome from a station on a secondary north to south line, to one on a main east to west route. The route resulting from these improvements and extensions forms the current London to Penzance line. In 1933 a by-pass route was constructed, enabling through traffic to avoid Frome station and the junction with the Radstock branch, and leaving the station on a looped branch as at present.

In 1925, there were nine or ten trains per day between Radstock and Frome with just two on Sundays. In 1956, this had reduced to only three, with none on a Sunday. The line to Radstock was formally closed in July 1988 by the removal of two rail lengths at Hapsford. The first part of the branch remains open to carry aggregate freight trains from Whatley Quarry. Colliery traffic from Radstock closed in 1973. This section of line is mainly used by Mendip Rail; Freightliner Group will take over the line in November 2019. After the branch near Great Elm to the quarry, the rest of the route to Radstock is now the route of National Cycle Route 24, otherwise known as the Colliers Way.

In February 2014, the station was refurbished. In December 2014 a plaque was installed at the station commemorating a journey made from Frome to London in 1912 by Leonard Woolf to propose marriage to writer Virginia Stephen.

=== Accidents and incidents ===
On 24 March 1987, a passenger train and a freight train were in a head-on collision due to the freight train passing a signal at danger. Locomotives 33 032 and 47 202 were severely damaged. Fifteen people were injured, some seriously.

== Facilities ==
The station has a ticket office and ticket machine, accessible toilets, a waiting room, a car park and cycle storage, and a help point. The station has full step-free access.

== Passenger volume ==
Passenger volume at Frome
	2004–05	2005–06	2006–07	2007–08	2008–09	2009–10	2010–11	2011–12	2012–13	2013–14	2014–15	2015–16	2016–17	2017–18	2018–19	2019–20	2020–21	2021–22	2022–23	2023–24	2024–25
Entries and exits	92,126	93,407	100,067	98,974	111,896	121,236	135,180	145,574	152,240	157,584	169,482	174,644	187,594	190,848	201,332	207,704	47,914	166,484	207,088	254,698	288,048

The statistics cover twelve month periods that start in April.

== Services ==
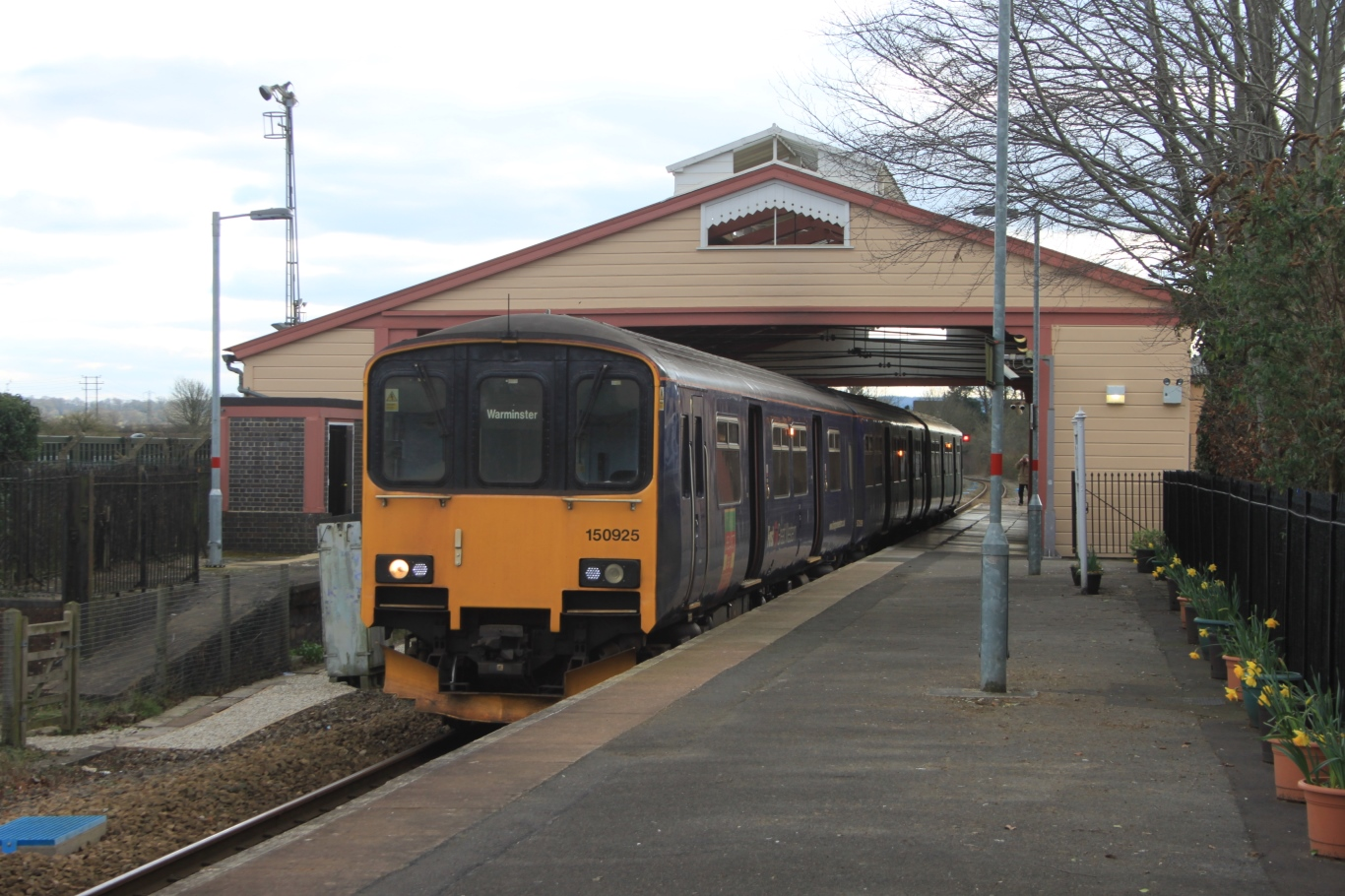
A Great Western Railway service in 2016

Great Western Railway operates services approximately every two hours between Bristol Temple Meads and Weymouth which also serve stations such as Bath Spa, Westbury and Yeovil Pen Mill. Beyond Bristol, some of these trains serve Gloucester or Cardiff Central. Great Western railway also operate limited services between Frome and London Paddington. South Western Railway operate infrequent services between Yeovil Junction, Yeovil Pen Mill and Frome to and from Westbury, Salisbury and London Waterloo.

Preceding station	National Rail	Following station
Castle Cary	Great Western Railway (Taunton–London service)	Westbury
Bruton	Great Western Railway (Heart of Wessex Line)	Westbury
Bruton	South Western Railway (Heart of Wessex Line)	Westbury
	Disused railways	
Mells Road	Great Western Railway (Bristol and North Somerset Railway)	Terminus

== Community rail ==
The station, along with others on the Heart of Wessex Line, is part of the South Wessex Community Rail Partnership.

== Bibliography ==
- Quick, Michael (2023). Railway Passenger Stations in Great Britain: A Chronology (PDF) (5th ed.). London: Railway and Canal Historical Society.
