= Langport and Castle Cary Railway =

English railway line

The Langport and Castle Cary Railway is a railway line from Castle Cary railway station to Cogload Junction near Taunton, Somerset, England, which reduced the length of the journey from London to Penzance by 20 1/4 miles (32.6 km).

== History ==
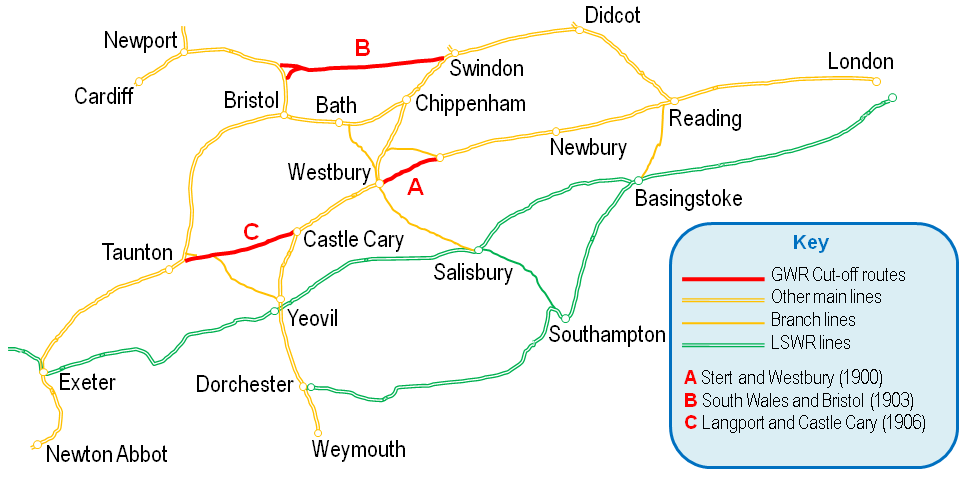
The GWR's cut-off lines to the west of England (shown in red)

Through trains from London Paddington station to Penzance in Cornwall started running in 1867 taking a circuitous route over the Great Western Railway (GWR) to Bristol, then the Bristol and Exeter Railway through Taunton to Exeter, the South Devon Railway to Plymouth Millbay railway station, the Cornwall Railway to Truro, and finally completing their journey on the West Cornwall Railway. By 1889 the whole route was controlled by the GWR, but trains still had to take the "Great Way Round" through Bristol.

There had been several schemes to build a shorter route to Cornwall, such as the Exeter Great Western Railway, but these came to nothing. Finally in 1895 the GWR directors announced that new lines were to be constructed to enable trains to reach Exeter, Plymouth and Penzance in a shorter time. The first stage was to lay a second track on the Berks and Hants Extension Railway from Hungerford to Patney and Chirton railway station, from where a new line was opened in 1900 that reduced the distance to Westbury on the Wilts, Somerset and Weymouth Line by 14 1/4 miles (22.9 km).

The first section of the Castle Cary Cut-Off was opened on 1 July 1905 from Castle Cary as far as Charlton Mackrell, then on 2 April 1906 goods trains started running east from the new Cogload Junction to Somerton and this was extended to Charton Mackrell on 20 May 1906. The route followed part of the Yeovil to Taunton Line – which was rebuilt with a second track and at a higher level to avoid flooding – from Athelney to Curry Rivel Junction near Langport East.

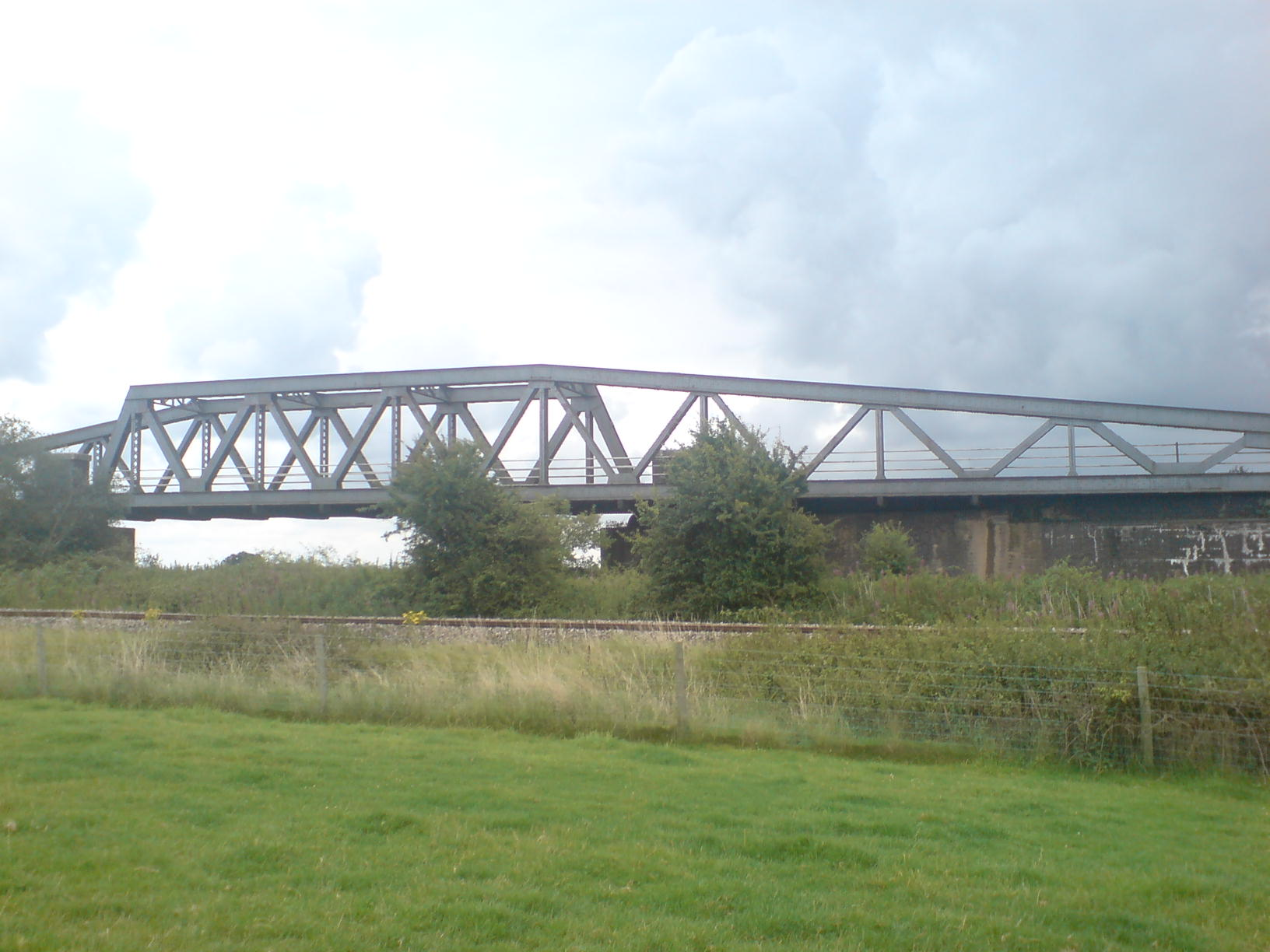
The flyover at Cogload Junction carries the Down Bristol line over the Cut-Off

Passenger trains first ran through Somerton on 2 July 1906 which then became the route for express trains to Devon and Cornwall. The prestige Cornish Riviera Express could now leave London Paddington station twenty minutes later yet arrive at Penzance at the same time as before. The new lines between Patney and Chirton and Cogload reduced the distance from London to Penzance from 325 1/2 to 305 1/4 miles; Taunton was now 143 instead of 163 1/4 miles from London – a 12 1/2% reduction. Two additional short cut-off lines were opened in 1933 to allow non-stop trains to avoid sharp curves at Westbury and Frome railway stations on the Wilts, Somerset and Weymouth Line, but this has not resulted in a shorter published mileage.

Cogload Junction was a flat junction which meant that trains from Taunton to Castle Cary had to cross the line used by trains from Bristol to Taunton. On 15 November 1931 a flyover was brought into use to allow the down trains from Bristol to pass above the two Castle Cary lines, and from there to Taunton and Norton Fitzwarren there were now four running lines. From East to West these were: Down Bristol, Down Castle Cary, Up Castle Cary, Up Bristol, but crossovers at Cogload were added later that allowed trains to run on the adjacent line when necessary.

== Current services ==
Trains now run non-stop between Castle Cary and Taunton. The regular service is operated by Great Western Railway but CrossCountry also use the line as a diversionary route should the main Bristol to Taunton Line be blocked, travelling over the Wessex Main Line via Bath Spa and Westbury to reach Castle Cary. Their drivers' knowledge in recent years has been maintained by running a summer Saturday service from Bristol to Paignton over this route. The 07:35 Bristol Temple Meads to Paignton ran via Castle Cary and was scheduled to reach Taunton in 65 minutes instead of the usual 37 minutes.

== Stations ==
The new line enabled the construction of six new stations but these all closed on 10 September 1962. Trains also served Athelney station and (from 1928) Lyng Halt on the old Yeovil branch, and Durston and Creech St Michael railway stations on the Bristol to Exeter Line, but fast trains avoided the middle two of these by using the new line from Athelney to Cogload.

=== Alford Halt ===
This small halt was opened on 21 July 1905, three weeks after the line was opened as far as Charlton Mackrell, to serve the village of Alford. A siding was opened for military goods traffic on 15 September 1940. The halt closed on 10 September 1962.

- Halt on navigable O.S. map

=== Keinton Mandeville ===
This station was the first one west of Castle Cary when the line opened on 1 July 1905 and was situated a mile south east of Keinton Mandeville. The main building was on the eastbound platform and the small goods yard was behind this platform at the east end.

=== Charlton Mackrell ===
For the first year after opening on 1 July 1905, the station at Charlton Mackrell was the terminus of the temporary branch from Castle Cary. In common with other stations between Castle Cary and Cogload Junction it was closed on 10 September 1962. The main building was on the eastbound platform and a goods shed and yard was situated behind this platform at the east end with the signal box opposite.

=== Somerton ===
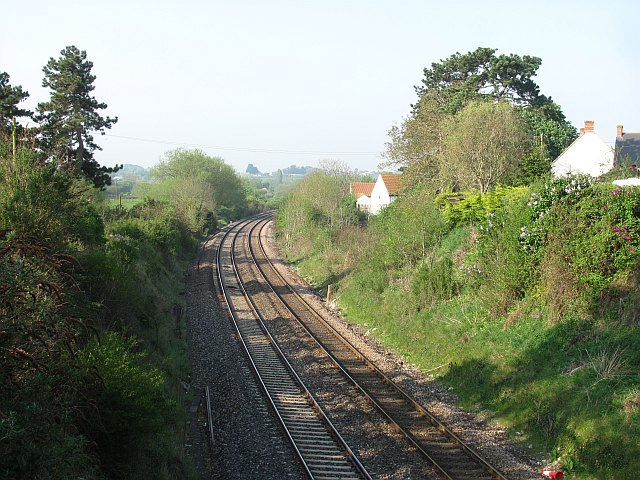
The site of Somerton station today

This station, opened on 2 July 1906, was officially known as "Somerton (Somerset)" to avoid confusion with "Somerton (Oxon)". It was in a cutting close to the centre of Somerton. The main building was on the eastbound platform with the goods shed at the west end of this platform. The original signal box was sited opposite the goods yard but a new signal box was opened late in 1942 to control some new loop lines installed to the west of the station to allow goods trains to be overtaken.

Although passenger trains were withdrawn on 10 September 1962, goods traffic continued to be handled until 6 July 1964.

=== Long Sutton and Pitney ===
This was an additional station opened on 1 October 1907 over a year after passenger trains started running on the line. It was situated in a cutting west of Somerton Tunnel near the hamlet of Upton but named after the larger villages of Long Sutton and Pitney, both about a mile distant south and north of the line respectively. The station had small corrugated iron shelters on both platforms.

Although passenger trains were withdrawn on 10 September 1962, goods traffic continued to be handled until 6 July 1964.

=== Langport East ===
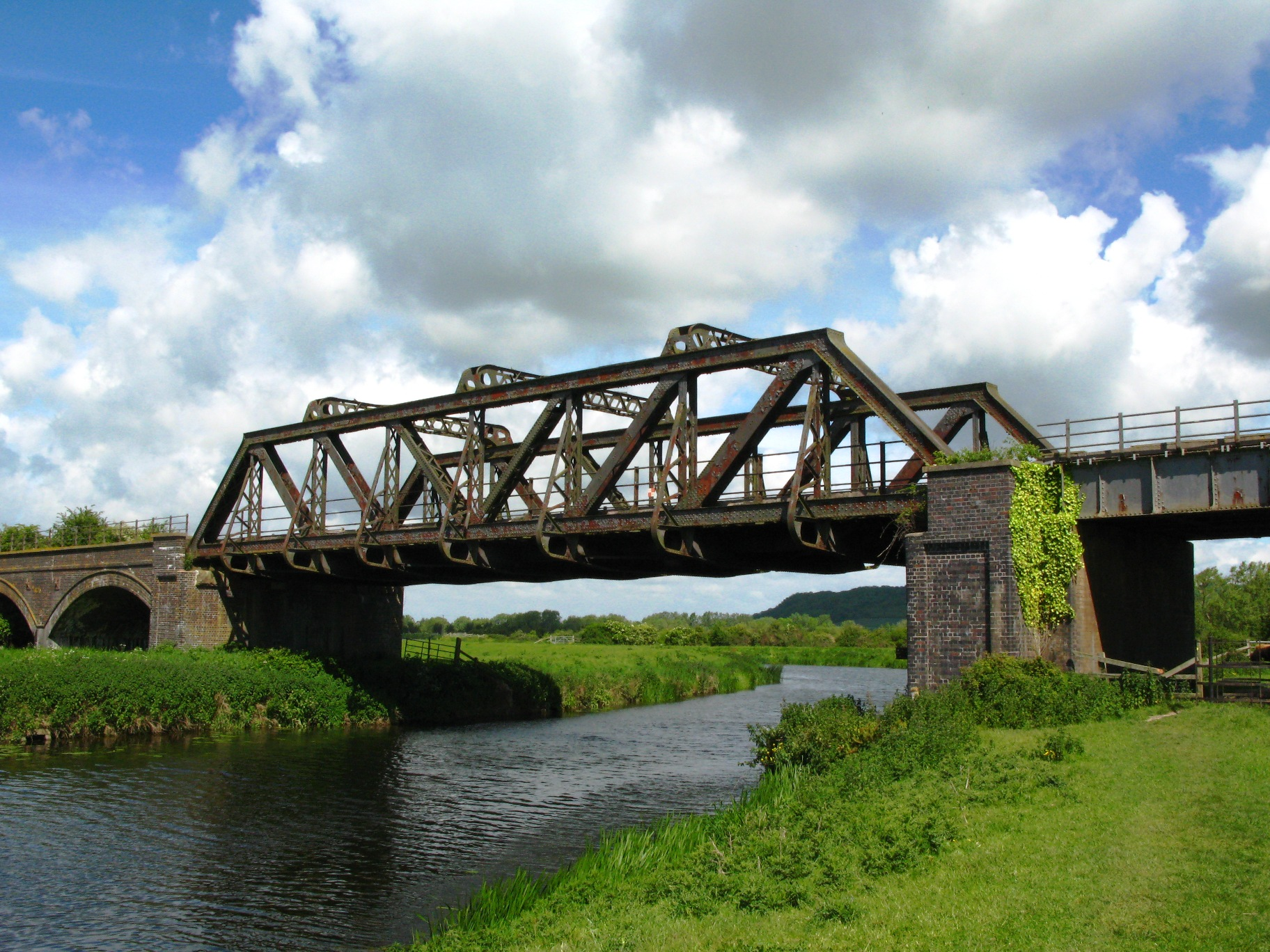
The railway crosses the River Parrett between Langport East station and the junction with the Yeovil Branch Line.

The first station at Langport was opened on 1 October 1853 on the Yeovil Branch Line. With the opening of the town's second station on 2 July 1906 it was renamed "Langport West" while the new one became "Langport East".

The new station gave access to direct trains to London but was unusual for stations on the line as the main building was on the westbound platform. Between the station and Curry Rivel Junction, where the cutoff joined the old branch line, the line crossed some moors on a low viaduct and the River Parrett on a 105 feet (32 m) girder bridge. Passenger services were also withdrawn on 10 September 1962.

=== Athelney ===
Although served by local trains between Castle Cary and Taunton, the station at Athelney was also served by trains on the Yeovil to Taunton Line and so remained open until 15 June 1964.
