= Yeovil–Taunton line =

Former railway branch line in Somerset, England

Overview
- Status: Closed
- Locale: Somerset
- Termini: Durston; Yeovil Pen Mill

History
- Opened: 1853
- Closed: 1964

Technical
- Num of tracks: 1
- Track gauge: 1,435 mm (4 ft 8 1/2 in)
- Old gauge: 7 ft (2,134 mm) until 1879

The Yeovil–Taunton line was a railway line in England, built by the Bristol and Exeter Railway (B&ER) to connect its main line with the market town of Yeovil in Somerset. It opened in 1853, using the broad gauge of 7 ft 1/4 in (2,140 mm) and was the first railway to serve Yeovil. It ran from a junction at Durston although, in later years, passenger trains on the line ran through to and from Taunton where better main and branch line connections could be made.

The Great Western Railway (GWR) operated the line from its opening until 1849 and absorbed the whole B&ER on 1 July 1876. (Note: Leased from 1 January 1876, amalgamated 1 July 1876)

A short part of the branch was incorporated into a new direct route from Reading to Taunton in 1906, which shortened the distance from London to Devon and Cornwall. Local passenger train service was discontinued in 1964 and only the section used by Reading to Taunton trains remains open.

== Background ==
The Bristol and Exeter Railway was authorised by the Bristol and Exeter Railway Act 1836 (6 & 7 Will. 4. c. xxxvi), following quickly on the Great Western Railway Act 1835 (5 & 6 Will. 4. c. cvii) for the construction of the GWR between London and Bristol. Isambard Kingdom Brunel was appointed engineer and the two companies worked in collaboration with the GWR operating the B&ER for a period. Both lines adopted Brunel's broad gauge of 7 ft 1/4 in (2,140 mm).

The B&ER line was opened to Taunton on 1 July 1842, using trains leased from the Great Western. It was extended to Exeter, opening on 1 May 1844.

In 1844, the Railway Mania was at its height and the B&ER was induced to propose a branch to Yeovil, hitherto not served by any railway. The B&ER obtained the Bristol and Exeter Railway Act 1845 (8 & 9 Vict. c. clv) authorising its branch line to Yeovil. It was to run from a junction at Durston, about six miles east of Taunton.

At the end of September 1846, Brunel resigned his position as engineer to the B&ER and he was superseded by Charles Hutton Gregory.

== Construction ==
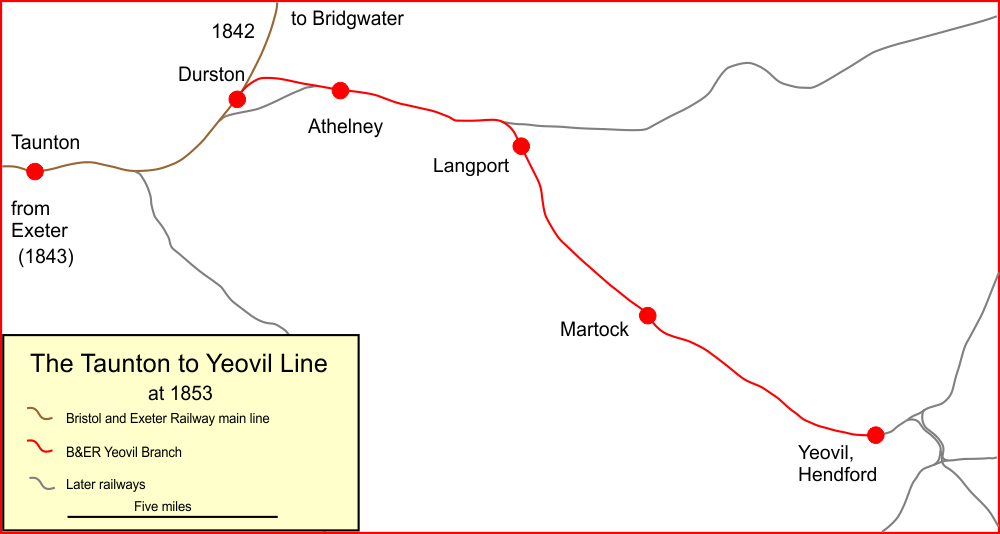
The branch line in 1853

Early in 1847 the B&ER let a contract for construction between Yeovil and Martock, a distance of six miles (9.7 km) and comprising the only heavy earthworks on the line; this was completed two years later.

However, in view of the new expenditure on rolling stock (connected with the B&ER decision to work the main line itself), the directors decided to suspend operations and nothing more was done until 1852.

Work on the remaining thirteen miles (21 km) from Martock to Durston began in June 1852 and despite heavy flooding that winter, it was opened for passenger traffic on 1 October 1853 and for goods on 26 October 1853. The line was single throughout (from Durston).

The Yeovil station was on the west side of the town, at Hendford, in the angle between Hendford Hill and the present-day Lysander Way. The station is often described as being on the "outskirts" of Yeovil. The distance from there to Yeovil High Street was about 500 m (550 yd).

Later maps (made after the extension to the Town station) show Hendford as forming a broad Y shape, with its stem facing west, the goods yard on the northern arm, and the single platform passenger station on the southern arm close to Hendford Hill.

The intermediate passenger stations on the line were Durston (at the junction with the main line) Athelney, Langport and Martock. The Yeovil station name is given as "Yeovil (Hendford)".

At this time the Taunton station consisted of two separate platforms, both on the south side of the line, one for Up trains and one for Down trains. Brunel more adopted a similar arrangement at Reading, Slough and Exeter. Speller says that because this seriously constrained capacity there, the Yeovil passenger trains ran from Yeovil to Durston only, with onward passengers changing trains there. The "arrangement continued until 1895, when the GWR provided some additional bay platforms allowing the Yeovil branch train to run into Taunton".

In 1868 Taunton station was adapted into a more conventional two-platform configuration, with a centre through road. The Ordnance Survey Town Plan for 1888 shows that, with what might be a bay platform on the Up side, but this was probably a carriage dock. In 1895 the platforms were lengthened (becoming the longest on the GWR system), and bay platforms were provided at each end.

== Extension to Pen Mill ==
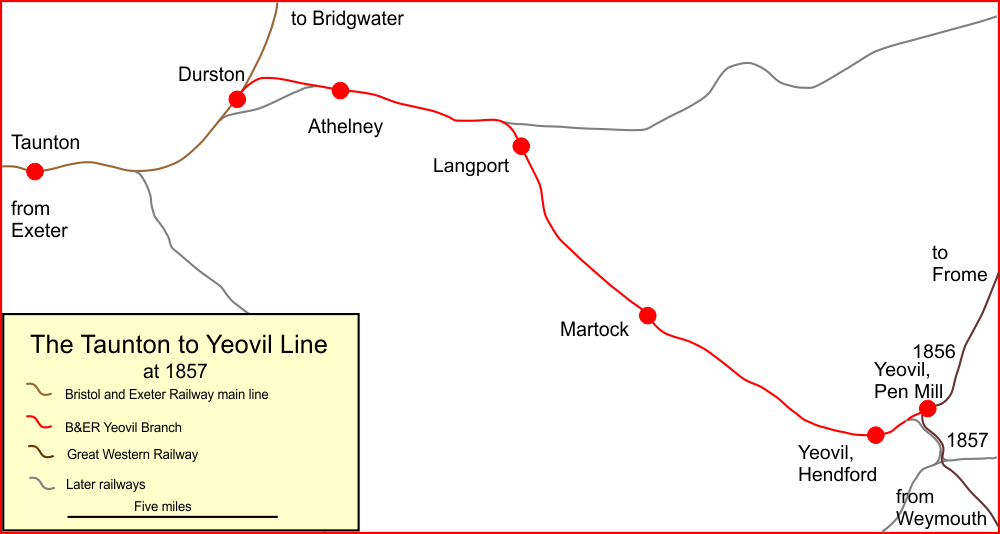
The branch after extension to Pen Mill in 1857

By the time the line was opened, the Wilts, Somerset and Weymouth Railway (WS&WR) was being promoted, and was to include a line from Frome to Weymouth. This line was taken over by the GWR and reached Yeovil from Frome on 1 September 1856. However its Yeovil station was planned to be at Pen Mill, on the east side of the town, and the B&ER extended its branch to meet the GWR's WS&WR line at the Pen Mill station.

The extension continued from the Hendford passenger station, crossing under Hendford Hill. Hendford remained open as the Yeovil station of the Bristol and Exeter Railway, until the opening of Yeovil Town in 1861. After this date it was retained as a "goods depôt" retaining the shed over one siding.

This extension opened on 2 February 1857, the same day as the opening of the line from Frome. The WS&WR line was opened from Yeovil to Weymouth on 20 January 1857.

== Salisbury and Yeovil Railway ==
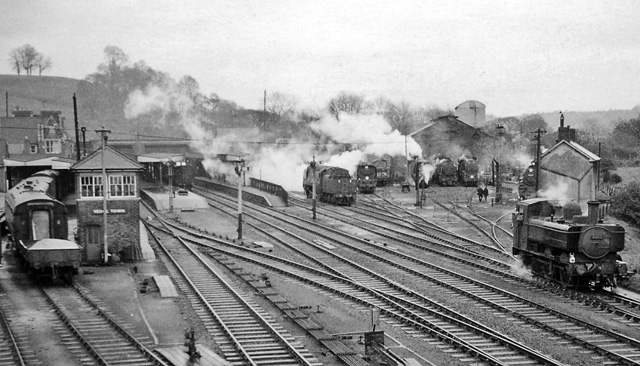
Yeovil Town station in 1964

The London and South Western Railway (L&SWR) had for many years been trying to extend its line to Exeter, and had experienced many setbacks. At length an independent company, the Salisbury and Yeovil Railway (S&YR) obtained authorisation for a line, and it reached Yeovil, opening on 1 June 1859, at a temporary terminus at Hendford. It was to be worked by the L&SWR, and that company was actively promoting its own line from Yeovil to Exeter.

The through Salisbury to Exeter line, which was to be formed by the S&YR and the L&SWR together, was to pass east–west somewhat south of Yeovil, but the S&YR was to approach Yeovil itself by a northward spur at its termination, joining the Hendford – Pen Mill line on the south side of the town. At this time, the stations in Yeovil were Pen Mill, on the GWR's Wilts Somerset and Weymouth line, and the Hendford terminus of the B&ER. This was a terminus, facing Taunton, and by-passed by the B&ER through line to Pen Mill.

In August 1859 the Sherborne Mercury published that the B&ER and S&YR had agreed to the construction of a new joint station at the point of junction. This became Yeovil Town. Pending its completion they agreed to accommodate S&YR traffic at Hendford, and for the purpose they laid an independent (i.e. separate second) standard 4 ft 8 1/2 in (1,435 mm) gauge track alongside their own single line, and to lay mixed gauge track in Hendford station yard.

This was used by S&YR passenger and goods trains from 1 June 1860 until the new Yeovil Town station was completed on 1 June 1861. It was an impressive building, with two platforms for the L&SWR and one for the GWR. Each company has its own station master and booking office.

Hendford passenger station closed on the same day, and the mixed gauge at Hendford yard was only used by transfer goods trains until the abolition of broad gauge on the branch, after which it became an ordinary goods yard.

== More standard-gauge encroachment ==
In 1867 the Somerset and Dorset Railway (S&DR) sought legal powers from Parliament to extend from their line at Shapwick to Bridgwater, then a significant port. To defeat this proposal in Parliament, the B&ER undertook to lay mixed gauge on their main line from Highbridge (where the S&DR and the B&ER lines crossed) to Bridgwater to the quays there, and on to Durston and from Durston to Yeovil, and to work a service of standard-gauge trains on that route.

The sum of £125,000 was spent on the track works and rolling stock for passengers and goods, and a daily standard-gauge goods train started running on the route from Yeovil to Bridgwater Docks in November 1867.

Speller says that:

As a result, the B&ER purchased six standard-gauge 0-6-0 locomotives for running trains over these lines, but traffic proved so sparse that they were converted to broad gauge. The line was converted to standard gauge in 1874 at the same time as the Wilts, Somerset and Weymouth Railway, which resulted in the re-conversion of the six locomotives to standard gauge.

However the passenger service on the route did not start, and in response to a shareholder's question, it was stated that the L&SWR had declined through working or other facilities. It may be that through goods from remote parts of the L&SWR system was lucrative, but permitting the B&ER access to that network was the thin end of a wedge.

The shareholder was informed that this incurred a dead loss of five or six thousand [pounds] a year, but that when the standard-gauge rail was laid between the Yeovil Joint [i.e. Town] station and Pen Mill, the standard-gauge stock would be used on the branch.

== Gauge conversion ==
In August 1878, the GWR chairman told the board that the time had come to consider gauge conversion on the branch lines. By this time, there was only one daily goods train from Taunton to Hendford and back. At the end of June 1879, the broad-gauge operation on the line was terminated.

== A shorter route from London to Taunton ==
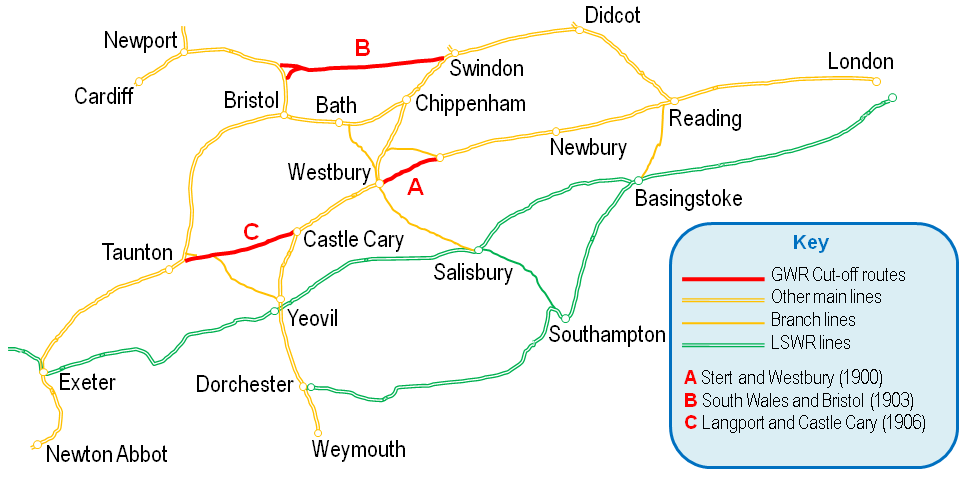
The GWR's cut-off lines to the west of England (shown in red)

From 1895, the GWR set about a programme of constructing new lines to shorten a number of circuitous routes. The route between Reading and Taunton was via Bath and Bridgwater and a more direct route could be formed, making use of some existing sections of line as well as new construction. As well as improvements further east, a new line was to be built between Castle Cary and a new Cogload Junction, between Durston and Taunton, referred to as the 'Castle Cary and Langport Line'.

It was to use four miles of the Taunton to Yeovil line between Curry Rivel Junction and Athelney. The branch line's Langport station was east of the new junction so a new Langport East station was built on the new main line while the old Langport station was renamed 'Langport West'. The junction at Athelney was just west of the River Parrett on the Somerset Levels. At Athelney, there would be a cut-off to join the former B&ER main line at Cogload. The chosen route would further reduce the length of the journey from London Paddington to Penzance by 20 1/4 miles.

The original line had experienced flooding on the Somerset Levels and the opportunity was taken to raise the level of the route as part of the upgrading work, as well as doubling the track. The new through route was opened for goods trains on 11 June 1906 and for passenger trains on 2 July 1906; the route was then the main line for express passenger trains to Devon and Cornwall.

== Later openings ==
A new halt called 'Thorney & Kingsbury' was opened in 1927, between Langport West and Martock.

On 13 August 1928, a halt was built on the B&ER main line to serve Creech St Michael. It cost £628 to build and was located to the east of the junction for the Chard branch.

Lyng Halt was opened on 24 September 1928, between Durston and Athelney, on the section that had been by-passed for through trains in 1906. It consisted of a basic sleeper-faced platform and a small wooden shelter.

Hendford Halt opened on 2 May 1932, a little to the west of the earlier Yeovil Hendford station (opposite Forest Hill), to serve the growing industrial area west of the town.

=== Motive power ===
Apart from trains using the Castle Cary and Langport route after 1906, the branch was operated as a rural line. In the mid-twentieth century, passenger services generally worked by a single GWR Pannier tank 0-6-0PT with two slam-door carriages, and later an auto trailer powered by a 14XX Class 0-4-2T locomotive. Heavier trains and the majority of goods services were worked by 45XX 2-6-2T locomotives.

== Closure ==
In the 1950s, with the continuing rise of the motor bus and the private car, traffic fell dramatically. As a result, the line fell victim to the Beeching Axe, and was proposed for closure. Passenger services ceased on 15 June 1964 with Durston station remaining open until 5 October 1964. The only section which remains open today is that either side of the site of the former Athelney railway station across the Somerset Levels, serving the Reading to Taunton Line.

== Present ==
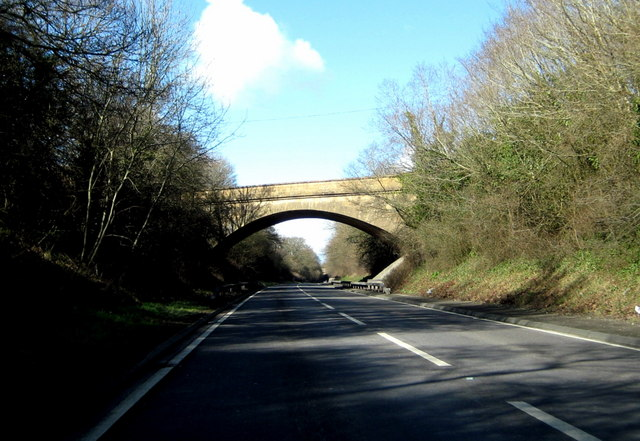
The A3088 road to the Cartgate roundabout, near Yeovil, which was built along the former railway in the late 1980s

Somerset County Council acquired the trackbed of part of the former route after closure. They constructed what became the A3088 road from Yeovil (just west of Westland Helicopters) to the junction with the A303 road at Stoke-sub-Hamdon. Some of the old railway bridges over the road remain.

== Stations ==
=== Yeovil Hendford ===
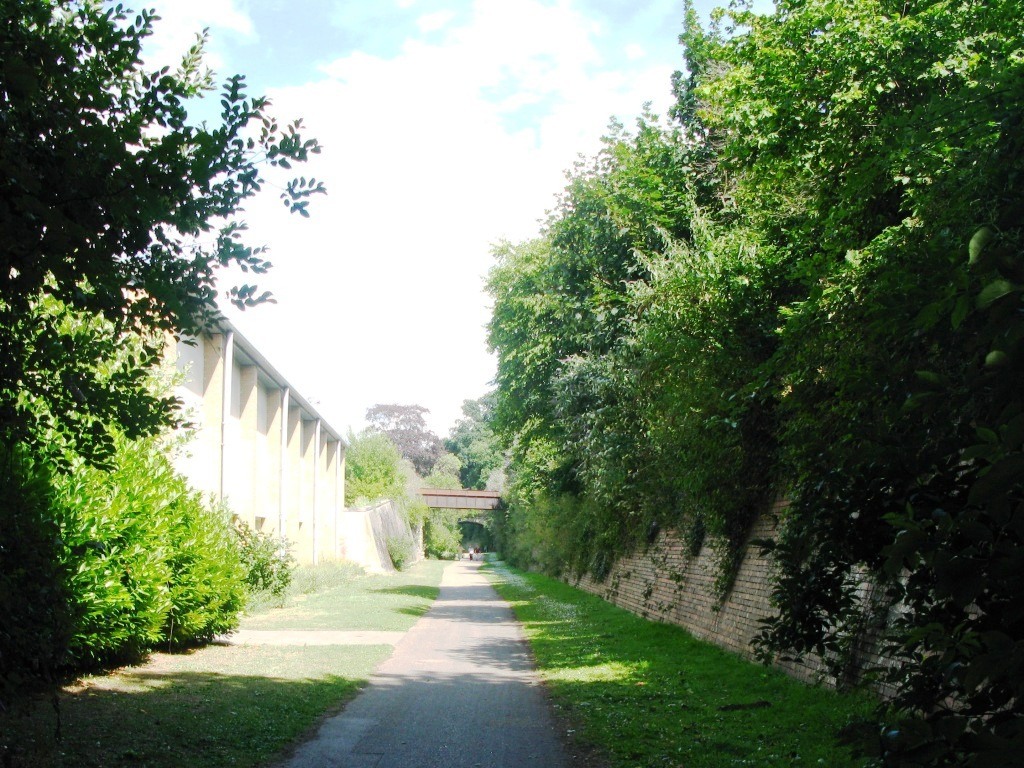
The route of the former line now part of a cycle path near the site of Yeovil Hendford

Location: 50.9358°N 2.6394°W (grid reference ST551153).
The initial Yeovil terminus of the line on opening. The station was closed in 1861 when the line was extended through the town to connect with the GWR line at Yeovil Pen Mill, and in 1860 trains served the new joint B&ER/L&SWR Yeovil Town.

=== Hendford Halt ===
A single platform halt opened 2 May 1932 and closed on 15 June 1964. The station has since been demolished.

=== Montacute ===
Location: 50.95716°N 2.71747°W (grid reference ST497177).
A new station called Montacute was opened in 1882, located about halfway between Martock and Hendford. It was demolished by construction of the A3088. There are no signs of the former station remaining, however the station master's house still exists and is appropriately named.

=== Martock ===
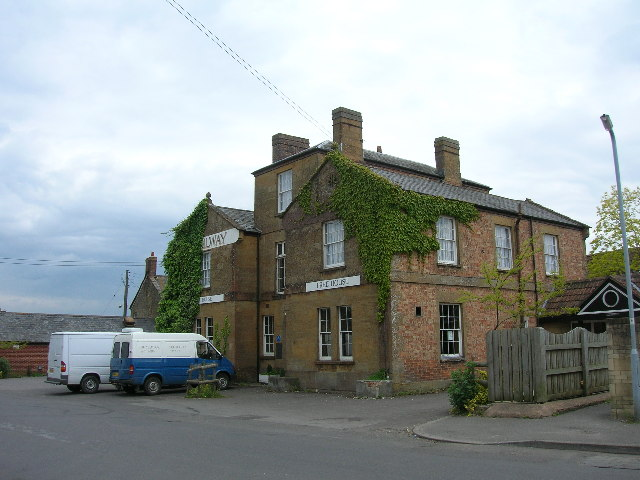
The former Railway Hotel, which stood opposite Martock station

Location: 50.97788°N 2.76762°W (grid reference ST462201).
The station opened on 1 October 1853. After closure, the station was demolished and an industrial estate was built upon the site.

=== Thorney and Kingsbury Halt ===
Location: 51.004574°N 2.816963°W (grid reference ST428230).
The station opened 28 November 1927.

=== Langport West ===
Location: 51.03523°N 2.83661°W (grid reference ST414265).
The former station site has been demolished and is now occupied by a housing and industrial development.

=== Athelney ===
Location: 51.05315°N 2.93707°W (grid reference ST344286).
The original building was on the north side of the single track. With the addition of the junctions on either side of the station, for the Langport and Castle Cary Railway in 1906, an expansion programme was agreed. A second platform was added and a large wooden building was sited on this which then became the main offices. A signal box, dating from 1881 on the north side of the line, was replaced at the same time by one on the south side, which remained in use until 5 April 1986 to control a level crossing. It has been rebuilt since at Staverton, on the South Devon Railway. The station closed on 15 June 1964.

Today, the station master's house and some railwaymen's houses still stand at Athelney. The main station building was moved to Stoke St Gregory playing field and is now the cricket and tennis pavilion.

=== Lyng Halt ===
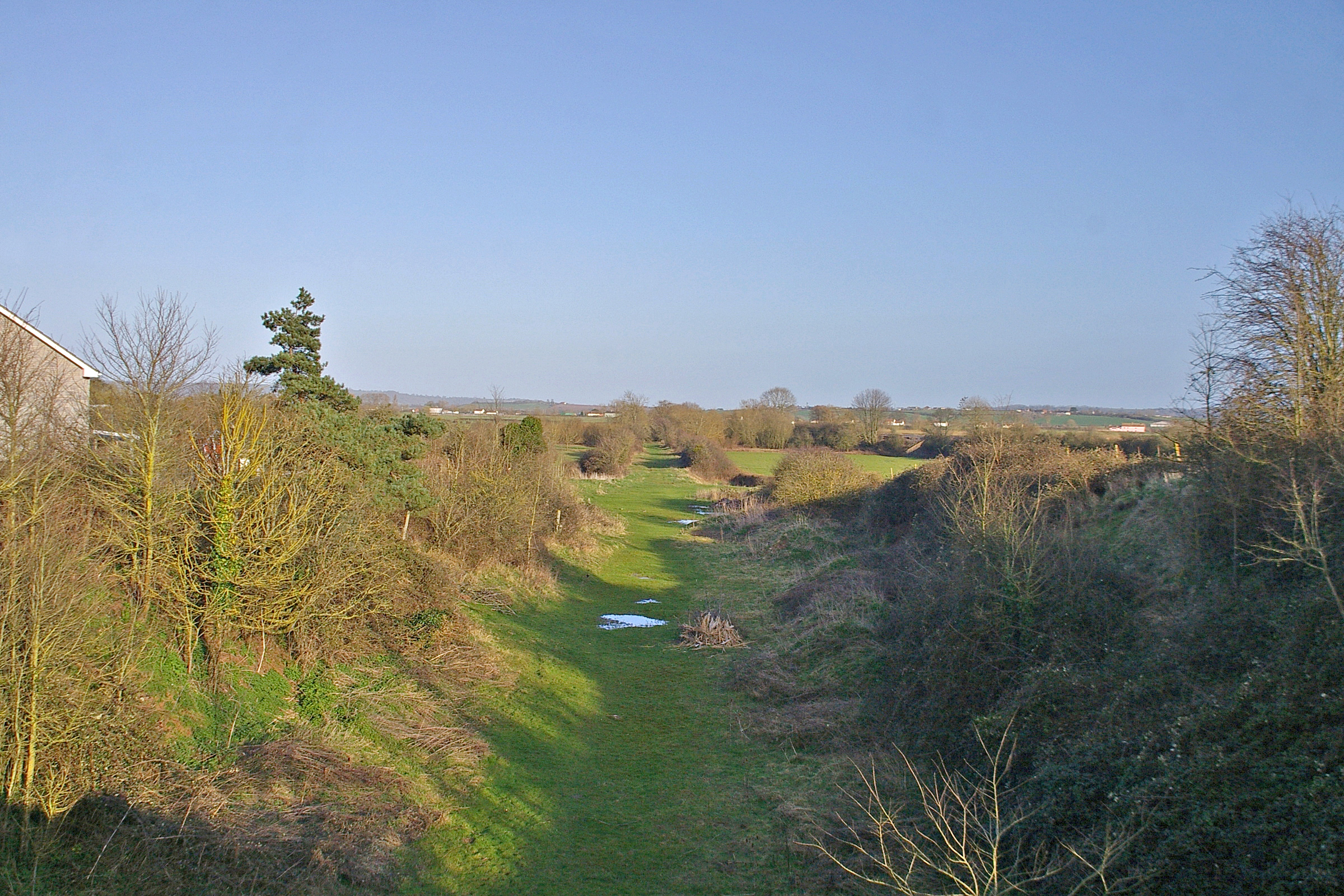
The site of Lyng Halt, long-since overgrown

Location: 51.054583°N 2.955469°W (grid reference ST331287).
An additional station was opened on the old Yeovil branch on 24 September 1928. It was a single platform, with a wooden waiting hut situated on the north side of the line in a cutting near the villages of East Lyng and West Lyng. It closed on 15 June 1964.

=== Durston ===
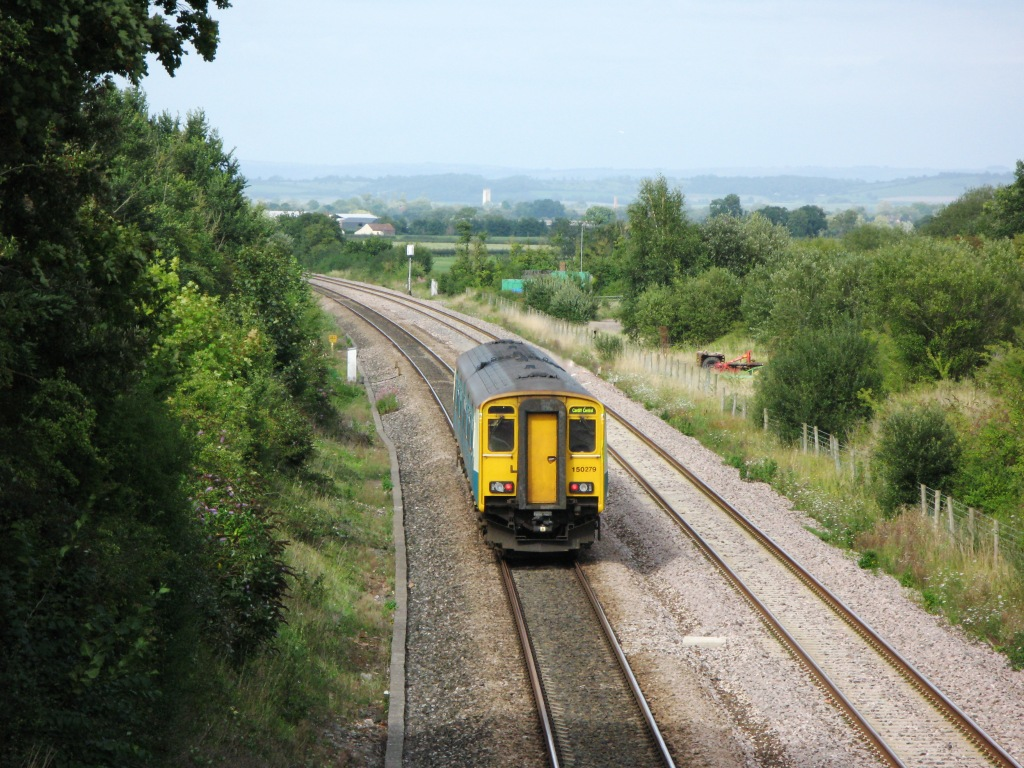
An Arriva Trains Wales Class 150, on loan to First Great Western, speeds past the site of Durston station, with a service from Taunton to Cardiff Central

Location: 51.05035°N 2.98920°W (grid reference ST307283).
The Bristol and Exeter opened its Yeovil branch line on 1 October 1853 from a new station situated at the north end of the cutting at Durston.

Despite the Langport and Castle Cary Railway opening in 1906, which effectively left Durston and Lyng Halt on a loop line from Cogload Junction, the station continued to serve the branch. The locomotive turntable was taken out of use on 21 September 1952 and the branch closed on 15 June 1964, with Durston station remaining open only until 5 October 1964. The only remains today are the Station Hotel and the trackbed of the old branch running off across the moors towards Athelney.
