= Somerton Tunnel =

Railway tunnel in Somerset, England

Coordinates: 51.04344°N 2.75761°W

- Interactive map of Somerton Tunnel

Overview
- Status: Operational
- System: Reading to Taunton Line
- Start: Somerton
- End: Langport

Operation
- Opened: 1906
- Traffic: Rail

Technical
- Length: 0.6 miles (0.97 km)
- No. of tracks: 2
- Track gauge: 1,435 mm (4 ft 8 1/2 in)

Somerton Tunnel is located between Somerton and Langport on the Reading to Taunton Line in Somerset, England.

The tunnel was constructed by the Great Western Railway (GWR) on the Langport and Castle Cary Railway. Remnants of its construction remain in the villages of Charlton Mackrell and Long Sutton. Completed during 1906 and in use since, the tunnel is just under a kilometre in length.

== History ==
Tunnelling was aided by the use of explosives. During its construction, explosives were stored in a powder house in Charlton Mackrell; according to local historian Derrick Warren, this structure is still standing. Another building believed to have been used as an explosives store is located at some distance from the tunnel's western portal in Long Sutton and is in a derelict condition. A worker was killed during the tunnel's construction in an incident that involved blasting charges that had failed to detonate as planned.

Somerton Tunnel has been subject to minor remedial works. In March 2020, Network Rail undertook work to improve drainage in the tunnel.
