= Bruton railway station =

Railway station in Somerset, England

Bruton
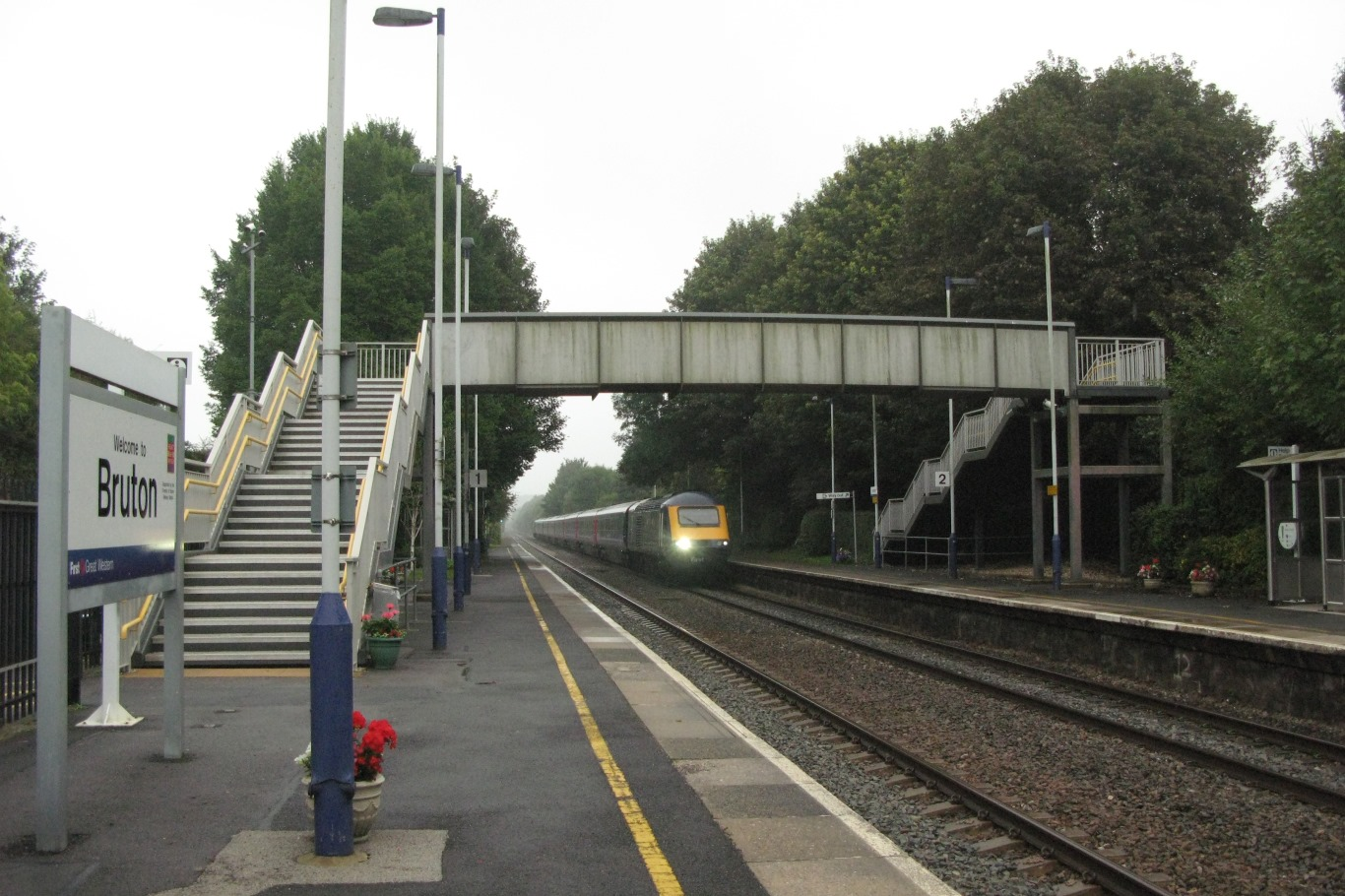

General information
- Location: Bruton, Somerset; England
- Coordinates: 51.11170°N 2.44732°W
- Grid reference: ST687347
- Manager: Great Western Railway
- Platforms: 2

Other information
- Station code: BRU
- Classification: DfT category F1

History
- Original company: Great Western Railway

Key dates
- 1856: Opened

Passengers
- 2021/22: ▲40,688
- 2022/23: ▲46,238
- 2023/24: ▲51,030
- 2024/25: ▲53,002
- 2025/26: ▼52,712
Location
Notes
- Passenger statistics from the Office of Rail and Road

Bruton railway station serves a largely rural area in the county of Somerset in England. The station is situated in the market town of Bruton. The station is on the Bristol to Weymouth line some 32.75 miles (53 km) south of Bath Spa. Trains on the Reading to Taunton line pass through the station but do not normally stop. Services are operated by Great Western Railway (who also manage the station) and South Western Railway.

== History ==
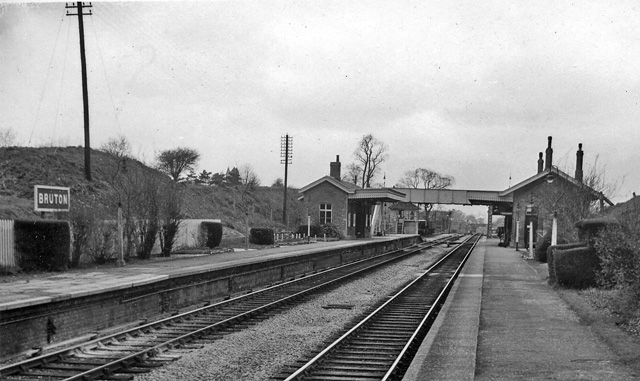
Bruton station in 1963

The station was opened by the Great Western Railway on 1 September 1856 on its Wilts, Somerset and Weymouth main line. At that time this was just a single track but a loop was provided at Bruton to allow trains to pass. A signal box was provided from 1877 at the west end of the station.

== Location ==
The cutting in which the railway is built is a Site of Special Scientific Interest as one of the best places in England to demonstrate the stratigraphic distinction of ammonites in the subcontractus zone and the morrisi zone.

== Facilities ==
The station has two platforms with a modern glass-and-metal waiting shelter on each. A footbridge enables passengers to cross the line. There is no wheelchair access to the far platform (for trains arriving from Bristol and going to Weymouth). The station has a bike rack and help points.

== Passenger volume ==
Passenger volume at Bruton
	2004–05	2005–06	2006–07	2007–08	2008–09	2009–10	2010–11	2011–12	2012–13	2013–14	2014–15	2015–16	2016–17	2017–18	2018–19	2019–20	2020–21	2021–22	2022–23	2023–24	2024–25
Entries and exits	17,167	18,449	19,369	18,520	23,444	25,576	25,544	27,364	30,078	32,088	34,096	36,950	40,660	41,364	42,798	48,818	12,308	40,688	46,238	51,030	53,002

The statistics cover twelve month periods that start in April.

== Services ==
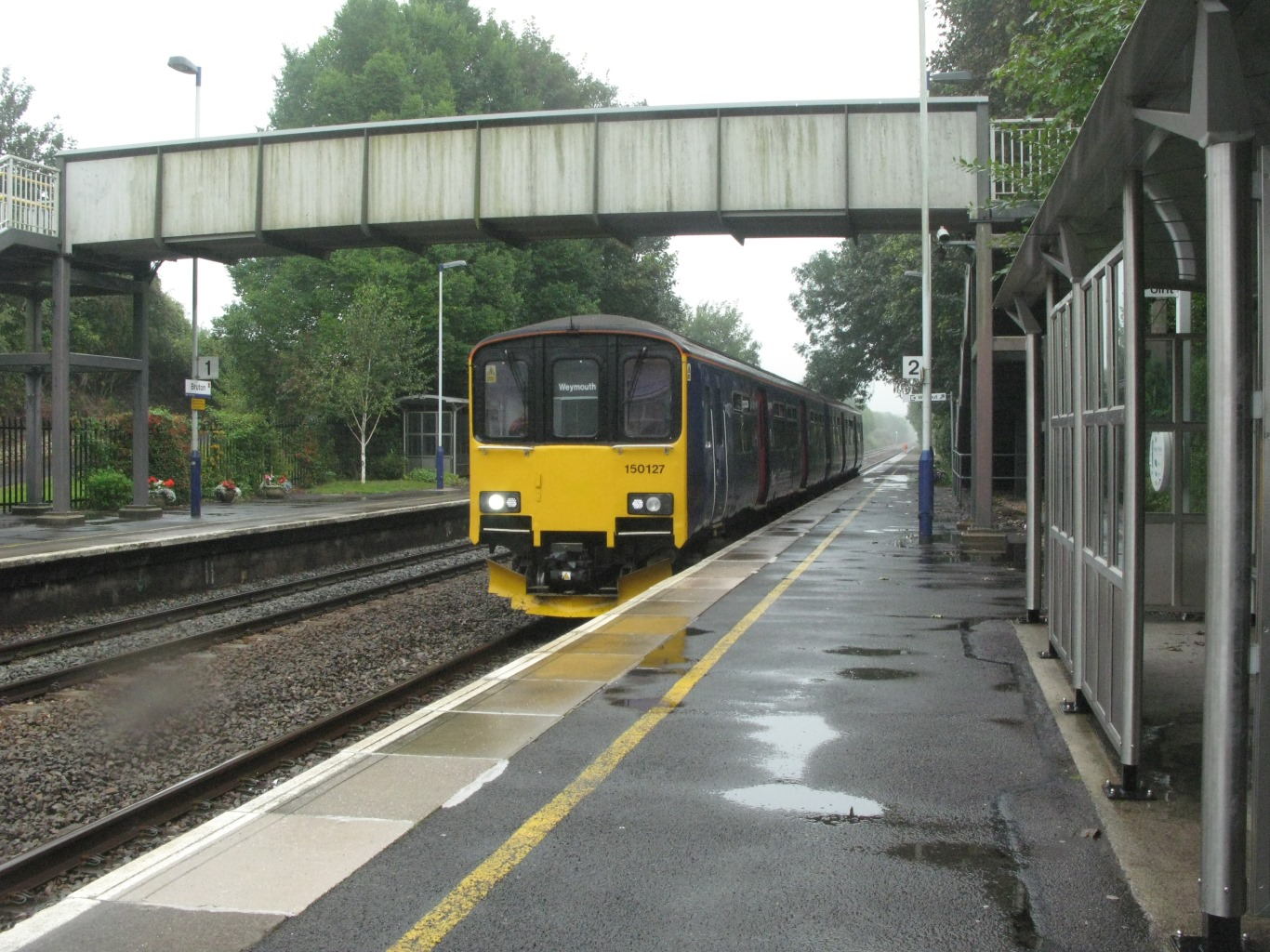
A train to Weymouth

Great Western Railway operates eight trains each way on the Bristol to Weymouth line during the week and five on Sundays. It is not a regular service; there are some gaps of up to three hours between trains. To the north services run to and from Bath Spa and Bristol Temple Meads via Westbury. Most are extended beyond Bristol to and from Gloucester. To the south trains run to Yeovil Pen Mill and Weymouth.

Additionally, there are services provided by South Western Railway that operate between Yeovil Junction and London Waterloo, although these are relatively slow due to taking an indirect route towards London, reversing at Westbury and travelling via Salisbury and the West of England Main Line. A faster and more frequent service to London is available at both Castle Cary and Westbury on the same route, from where Great Western Railway operates trains between London Paddington and Exeter St Davids. These trains pass Bruton, but do not stop.

Preceding station	National Rail	Following station
Castle Cary	Great Western Railway; Heart of Wessex Line	Frome
Castle Cary	South Western Railway; Heart of Wessex Line	Frome

== Community rail ==
The station, along with others on the Heart of Wessex Line, is part of the South Wessex Community Rail Partnership.

== Bibliography ==
- Quick, Michael (2023). Railway Passenger Stations in Great Britain: A Chronology (PDF) (5th ed.). London: Railway and Canal Historical Society.
