= Cogload Junction =

Railway junction in Somerset, England

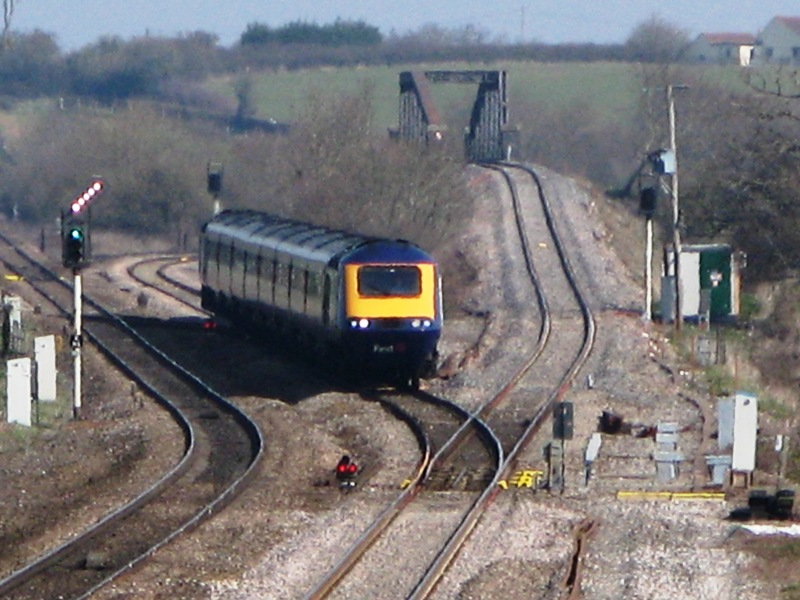
- A train from London via Castle Cary travels west

Overview
- Locale: Durston, Somerset, England; 51°02′35″N 2°59′52″W
- Connecting lines: Reading to Taunton; Bristol to Taunton

History
- Opened: 1906
- Flyover built: 1931
- Signal box closed: 1986

Technical
- Track gauge: 1,435 mm (4 ft 8 1/2 in) standard gauge
- Operating speed: 100 mph (160 km/h)

Cogload Junction is a railway junction in Durston, Somerset, England. It is where the 1906-opened London to Penzance Line via Castle Cary joins the original line that runs via Bristol Temple Meads. A flyover was constructed in 1931 converting it into a flying junction.

== Location ==
The junction is situated in the parish of Durston, 5 miles (8 km) east of Taunton railway station, but is named after Cogload Farm which is south of the Castle Cary Line near the junction. It lies alongside the Bridgwater and Taunton Canal.

== History ==
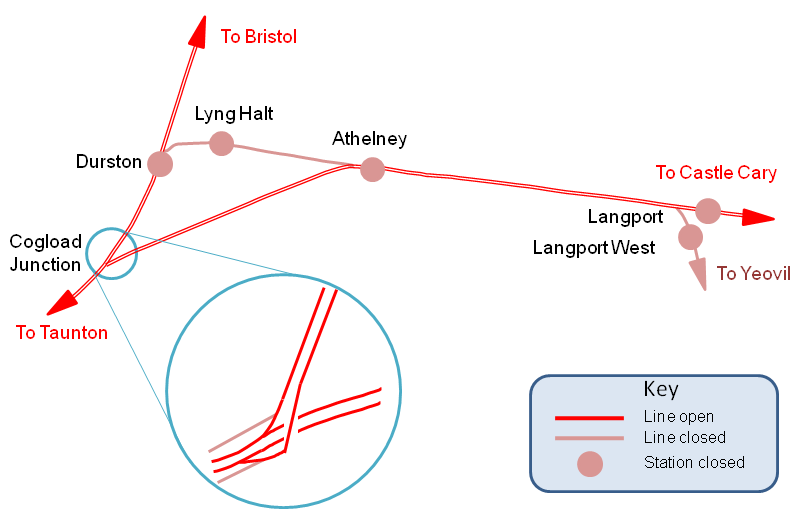
Lines around Cogload Junction

The Bristol and Exeter Railway was opened through Durston on 1 July 1842. By 1867 it was carrying through trains from London Paddington to Penzance, and in 1876 the line became part of the Great Western Railway. On 11 June 1906 goods trains started to run over the new Langport and Castle Cary Railway line between Cogload and Castle Cary, and passenger trains joined them on 2 July that year. This shortened the journey from London to Taunton (and Penzance) by 20.25 miles (33 km).

At this time an ordinary double-track flat junction was provided, which meant that down trains running from Bristol to Taunton could be delayed by up trains from Taunton to Castle Cary crossing in front of them. In 1931 work was undertaken to convert it to a flying junction which would then allow the down Bristol trains to cross over the up Castle Cary route without conflict. On 19 July the signal box was moved 660 yards (600 m) west of the original junction where it had been standing, but it remained on the north side of the line between the railway and the canal. This allowed the tracks to be moved to a new alignment to give space for the construction of the embankment for the down Bristol line. The completed layout with the flyover was brought into use on 15 November. Two additional tracks westwards from Cogload to Creech St Michael were brought into use at the same time. The four tracks were (from north to south): up Bristol, up Castle Cary, down Castle Cary, down Bristol. No physical junction then existed between the two routes at Cogload, but on 8 July 1934 a connection was installed that allowed down trains from Bristol to be switched onto down Castle Cary line at Cogload; and on 25 October 1942 a similar connection was put in to allow up Bristol trains to use the Castle Cary line from Taunton to Cogload. These connections allowed fast Bristol trains to overtake slower trains that called at Creech St Michael Halt which only had platforms on the outer (Bristol) tracks. Slow trains between Taunton and Castle Cary ran via Durston station to Athelney on the Yeovil Branch Line where there was another junction with the Castle Cary route, which meant that they ran through Cogload and Creech St Michael on the outer tracks.

On 29 March 1986 the two Bristol lines were taken out of use between Cogload and Taunton, returning the line to its original two tracks. The following weekend saw Cogload signal box closed on 5 April, and the points and signals were then operated from Exeter Panel Signal Box. A slight realignment of the up Bristol line at the same time allowed the junction to be moved and the speed limit raised to 90 miles per hour (140 km/h).

== Flyover ==
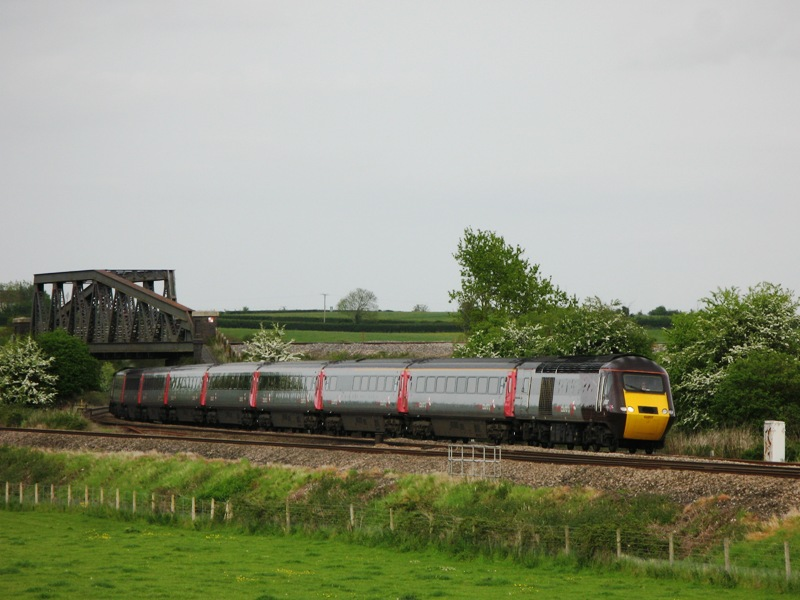
43207 leads a diverted CrossCountry train under the flyover off the Castle Cary Cut-Off

In 1931 two embankments were built. A long, shallow one alongside the down Bristol line between Durston railway station and Cogload; and a shorter, steeper one alongside the down Castle Cary line to bring trains back to ground level before the line passes beneath the road bridge at Charlton, a short distance east of the junction. Between the two embankments is a large steel Warren truss girder bridge.

The two trusses are asymmetrical and different sizes as the bridge is constructed on the skew due to the angle that the two lines make to each other. The larger truss is 185 feet (56.4 m) long and weighs 88 long tons (89 t); the smaller truss is 161 feet (49.1 m) and weighs 70 long tons (71 t). Vertical suspenders are attached to alternate cross-girders, which are spaced at 11.75 feet (3.6 m) centres. These support two longitudinal bearers beneath the rails, above which is a steel deck. The whole steelwork weighs 227 long tons (231 t).
