= Taunton railway station =

Railway station in Somerset, England

Taunton
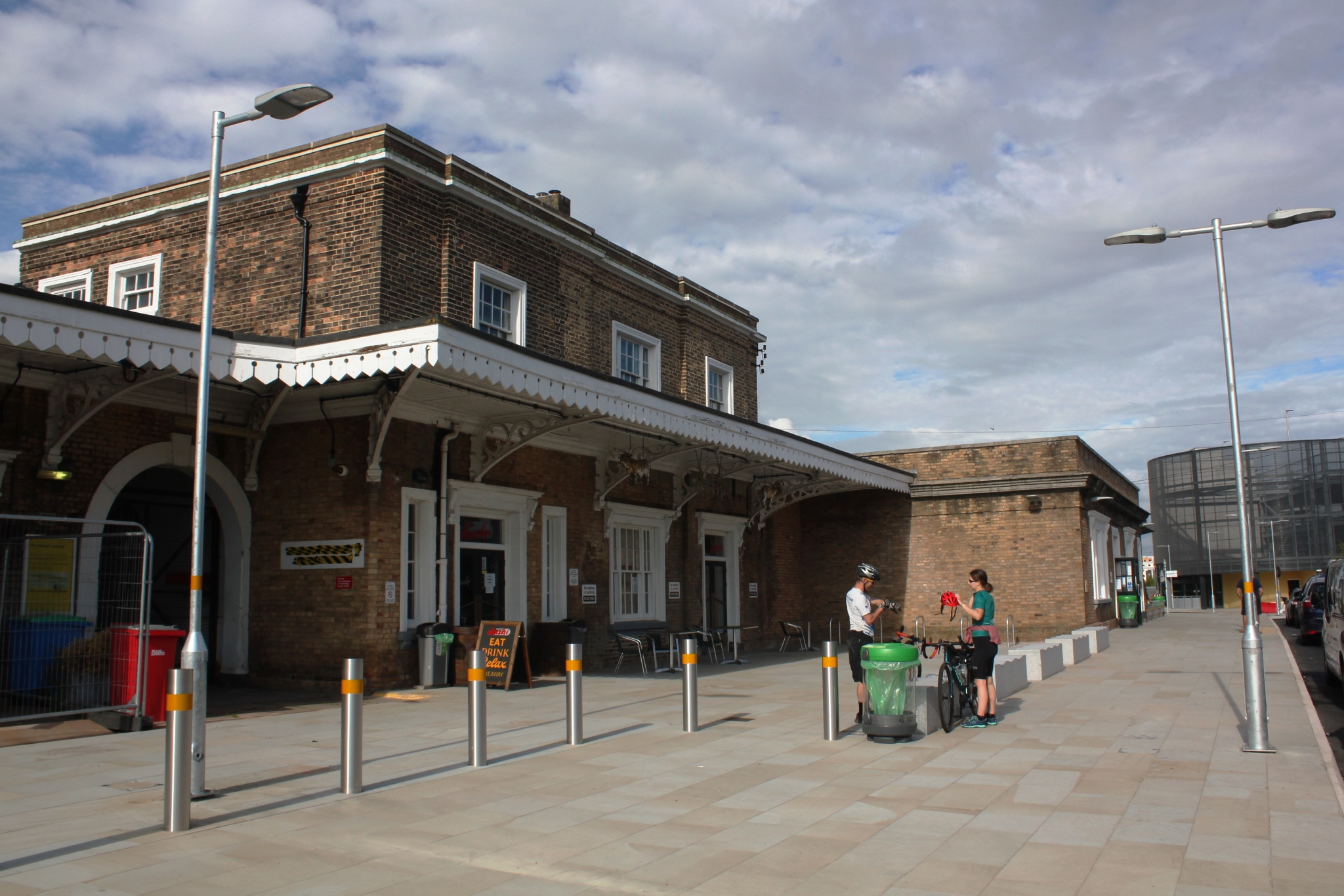
- The main buildings in 2021

General information
- Location: Taunton, Somerset, England
- Coordinates: 51.0228°N 3.1035°W
- Grid reference: ST227254
- Manager: Great Western Railway
- Platforms: 6

Other information
- Station code: TAU
- Classification: DfT category C1

History
- Original company: Bristol and Exeter Railway
- Pre-grouping: Great Western Railway
- Post-grouping: Great Western Railway

Key dates
- 1842: Brunel station opened
- 1868: Rebuilt in conventional form
- 1932: Rebuilt with four tracks
- 2021: Entrance returned to south side

Passengers
- 2021/22: ▲1.197 million
- Interchange: ▲71,157
- 2022/23: ▲1.398 million
- Interchange: ▼69,064
- 2023/24: ▲1.465 million
- Interchange: ▲75,203
- 2024/25: ▲1.616 million
- Interchange: ▲82,424
- 2025/26: ▲1.766 million
- Interchange: ▲0.104 million
Location
Notes
- Passenger statistics from the Office of Rail and Road

Taunton railway station serves the county town of Taunton, in Somerset, England. It is a stop on the Bristol to Exeter line, the Reading to Taunton line and the Cross Country Route. The station lies 163 miles 12 chains (263 km) west of London Paddington, via Box, although most London-bound services take the shorter route via Newbury. It is managed by Great Western Railway, which also operates services along with CrossCountry. The West Somerset Railway operates here on special event days and provides main line steam excursions.

== History ==
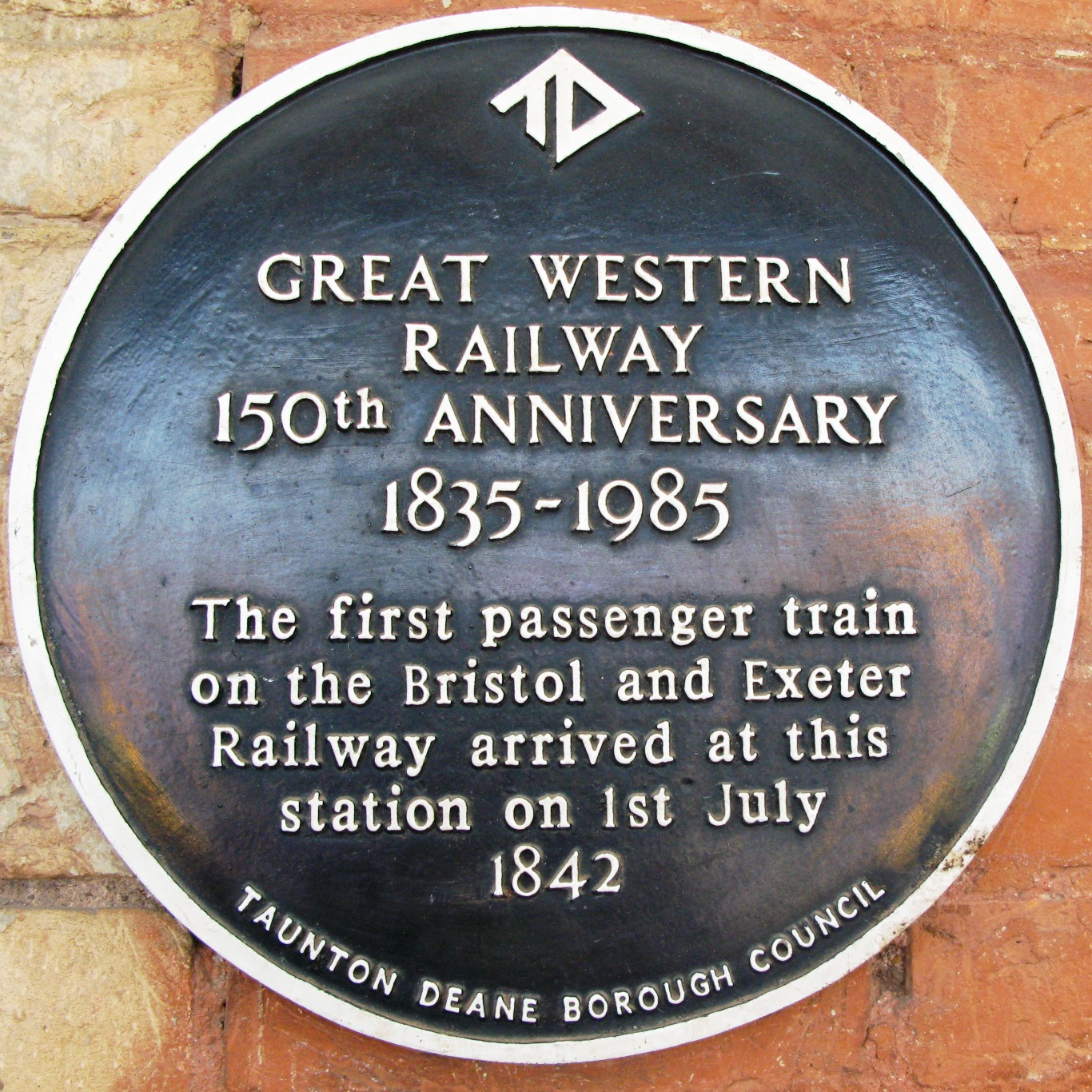
Plaque marking the 150th anniversary of the station opening

Originally opened on 1 July 1842 as part of the Bristol and Exeter Railway, Taunton was the terminus of the line until a new temporary terminus was opened on 1 May 1843 further west at Beambridge.

Isambard Kingdom Brunel's original design was for a single-sided station with two platforms, each with their own buildings and train sheds, placed on the south side of the line. A hotel was built between them and the Grand Western Canal. Having both platforms on the town side of the line was meant to help passengers but was found to be problematic as the railway became busier, with each train having to cross the line used by trains in the opposite direction. An engine shed was provided at the west end of the station.

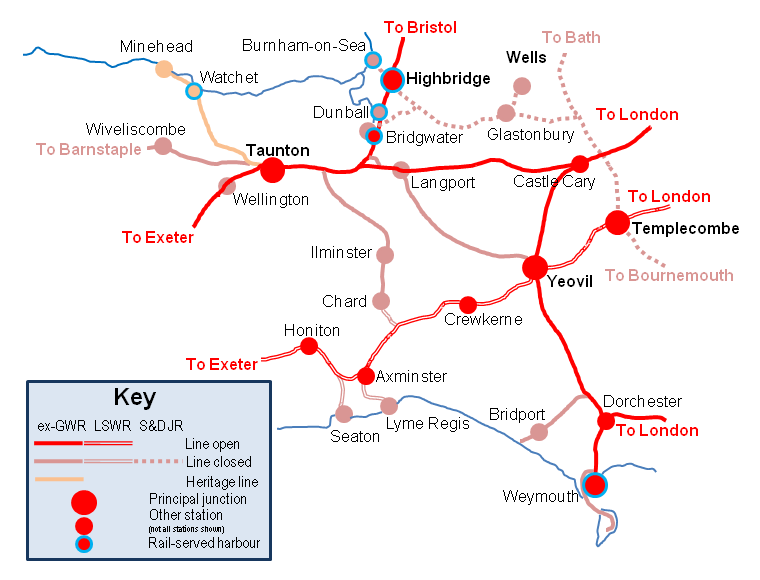
The local railway network

A series of branches opened in the area over the next thirty years; these were the:

- Yeovil branch line (1 October 1853)
- West Somerset Railway to Watchet (31 March 1862)
- Chard Branch Line (11 September 1866)
- Devon and Somerset Railway (8 June 1871, extended to Barnstaple 1 November 1873).

While none of these branches had a junction in Taunton, the trains were generally run through to the station to provide connections.

The station was unable to cope with all these extra trains and passengers, so a major rebuilding was completed on 17 August 1868. The up station at the east end was demolished and replaced by a more conventional platform on the north side of the line; the "down station" was extended onto the site now vacated, and a new single 200 feet (61 m) train shed was provided covering the whole station. Goods traffic was moved away from the passenger platforms by the opening on 1 November 1896 of a pair of avoiding lines that skirted around the south side of the station behind the old hotel. A larger engine shed was opened in the same year.

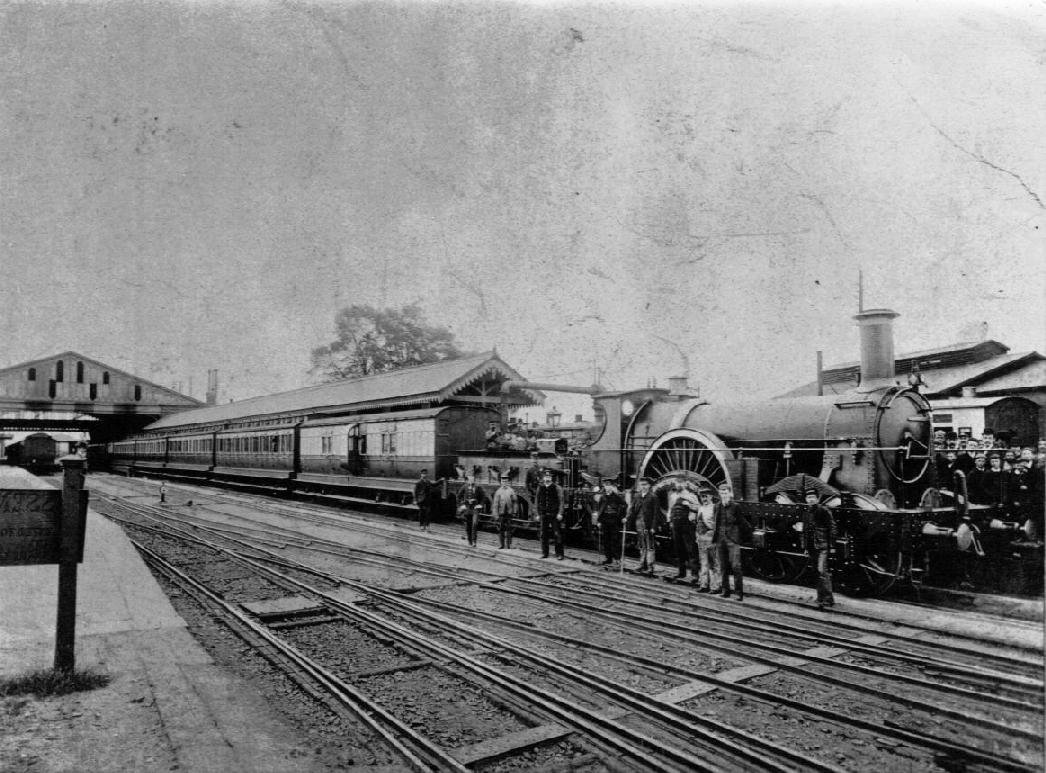
A westbound train in 1892, when part of the platform was covered by a roof

The platforms were extended again in 1895. Now covering the whole length of the original single-sided station, they were the longest platforms on the Great Western Railway (which had amalgamated with the Bristol and Exeter company on 1 January 1876). New bay platforms were added to handle the trains from the branch lines.

The lines through Taunton from Cogload Junction to Norton Fitzwarren were widened from two to four tracks in the 1930s. Those east of Taunton were brought into use on 13 December 1931 and those to the west on 14 February 1932. This work forced another rebuilding of the station. The train shed was dismantled and new buildings constructed on the up (north) side along with a new island platform in the middle of the station. This gave a platform face for each of the four through lines, which were brought into use on 7 February 1932. Work included a new subway that replaced the old footbridge, and a new booking office at road level on the north side of the station. The old goods shed was replaced by a two-storey goods warehouse next to the avoiding line, east of the station on 20 February 1932.

The platforms were numbered:

1. The down relief platform, principally used by expresses from Bristol (now platform 2)
2. A bay at the east end, used for arrivals from Chard, Yeovil, Castle Cary (track now removed)
3. The inner bay at the west end, double sided around the single track, principally used for Barnstaple departures (now platform 1, served from a single side)
4. The outer bay at the west end, principally used for Minehead departures (now disused)
5. The down main platform, mainly used by expresses from London (now platform 3)
6. The up main platform, mainly used by expresses to London (now platform 4)
7. The up relief platform, mainly used by expresses to Bristol (now platform 5)
8. A bay at the west end, occasionally used for Minehead/Barnstaple arrivals (track now removed)
9. A bay at the east end, used for stopping train departures to Bristol and Yeovil (now platform 6).

Although some no longer have tracks, all of the platform structures are extant.

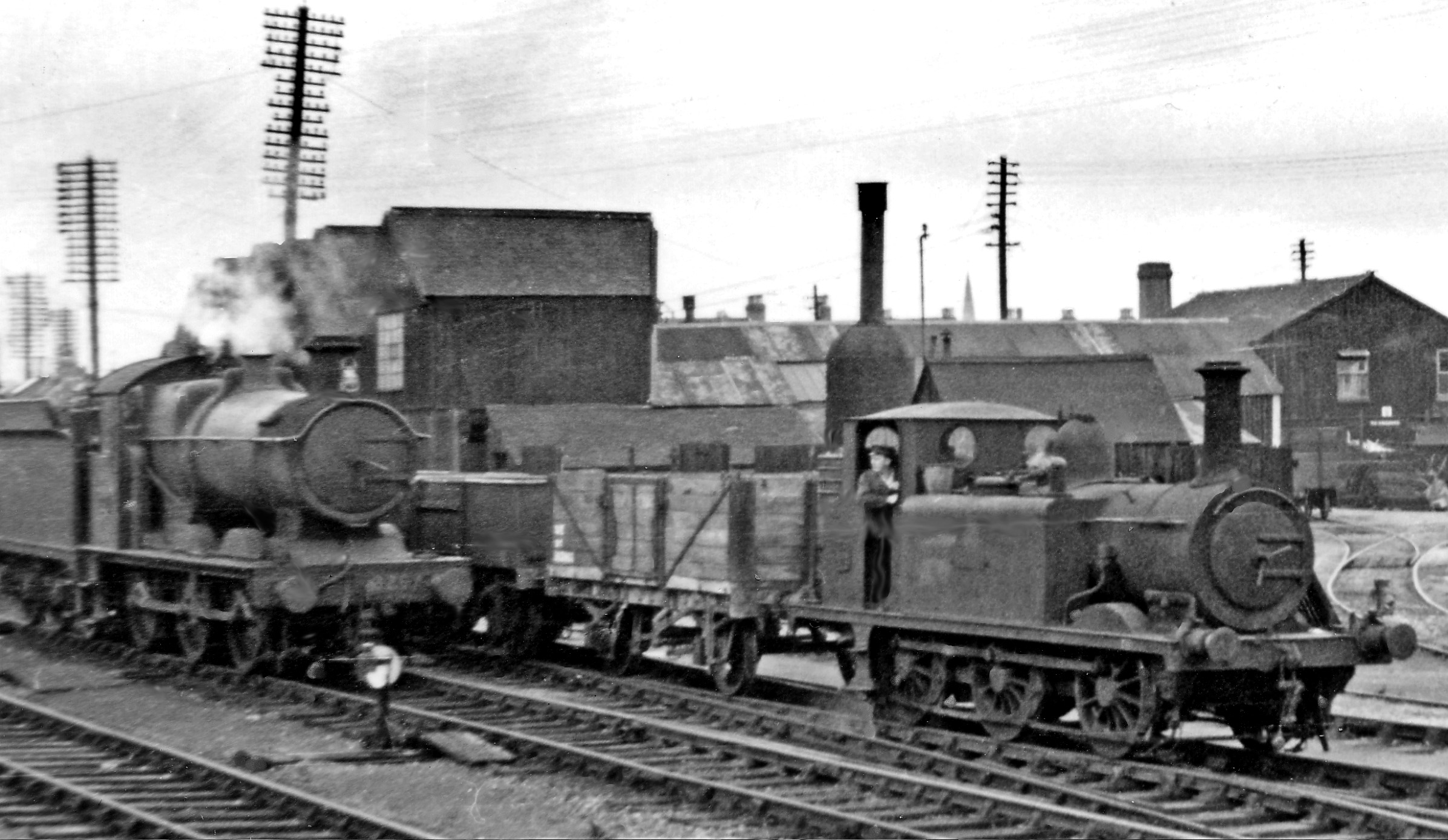
Outside the engine shed in 1949

The four tracks to the east of Taunton were not used as normal main and relief lines until 1970; the inner main lines were used for trains to London and the outer lines for trains to Bristol. This was to align with the way the tracks diverged at Cogload Junction, some miles to the east of the station. In 1970, under the Western Region of British Rail, the central island platform was closed off and all trains stopping at Taunton used the outer platforms, except in an emergency when the central platform was pressed into use. London trains stopping at Taunton now crossed over to the main lines at the London end of the station. The second pair of lines from Cogload were removed in 1986.

The goods depot closed for general traffic in 1965, although bulk coal was handled until 1972. The engine shed closed on 1 January 1972, by which time it only served as a fuelling point for local diesel shunting locomotives. The various branch lines closed during the 1960s and 1970s, so only one bay platform was retained for local trains starting towards Bristol Temple Meads. The island platform was taken out of regular use for a few years, although it could be opened up in an emergency (albeit with no platform numbers, nor a lift). This situation no longer applies as the platforms were reopened for normal services in 2000 and a new lift installed in 2007 to replace an electric stair lift which could carry one seated person at a time but no luggage. A west-facing bay platform has also been reinstated for passenger use, although there are no regular trains timetabled to use it.

Today, the original down station building survives, along with the hotel and the extensions added in 1868. An examination of the brickwork on the south-side building reveals where the footbridge was removed in favour of the present subway. On the north side, the ticket office dates from 1983 but the remaining buildings generally date from the 1932 rebuilding and stand on foundations from 1868. The goods warehouse is largely derelict and most of the engine shed has been razed to the ground except for an asbestos-clad repair shop built in 1932 and the ramp that used to serve an elevated coaling stage. The engine sidings are still used by engineers' plant machines; Freightliner locomotives are generally stabled at Fairwater Yard, but occasionally use the old engine shed sidings for additional storage space. The avoiding line is truncated but serves as a headshunt for the long engineers trains using Fairwater Yard.

The "40 Steps" footbridge to the west of the station, a favoured location for generations of rail enthusiasts, was demolished at the end of 2013 due to construction of a new road alongside the railway. This was replaced by a more modern bridge with both steps and slopes making it more accessible.

The ticket office was moved back to the south side of the station in 2021 as part of works to improve passenger facilities and make easier links to the town centre. A 400-space multi-storey car park was also built.

Preceding station	Historical railways	Following station
Thornfalcon	Great Western Railway (Chard branch line)	Terminus
Creech St Michael	Great Western Railway (Yeovil Branch Line)	Terminus
Creech St Michael	Great Western Railway (Reading–Taunton line and Bristol to Taunton Line)	Norton Fitzwarren
Terminus	Great Western Railway (Minehead Branch Line and Barnstaple Branch Line)	Norton Fitzwarren

== Description ==
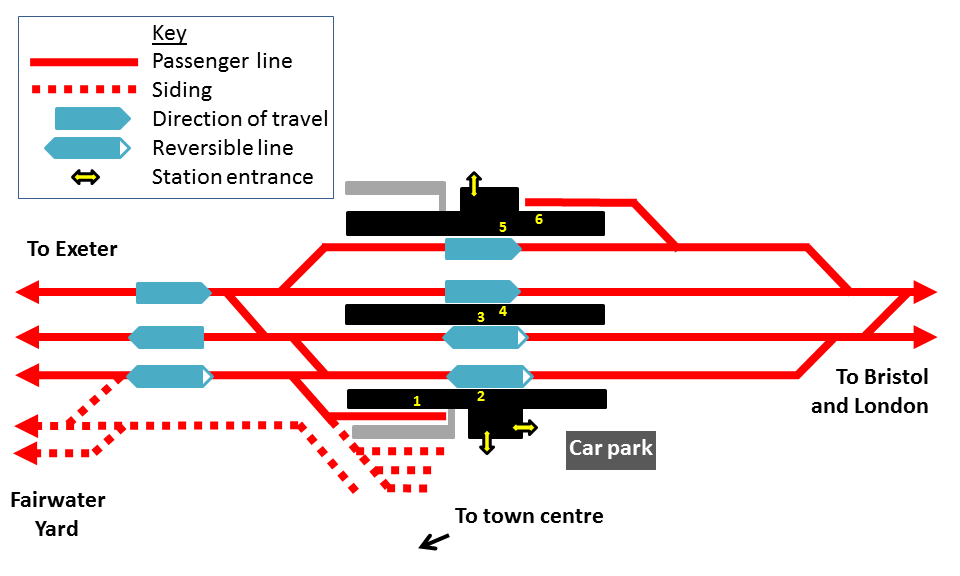
Track layout in 2021

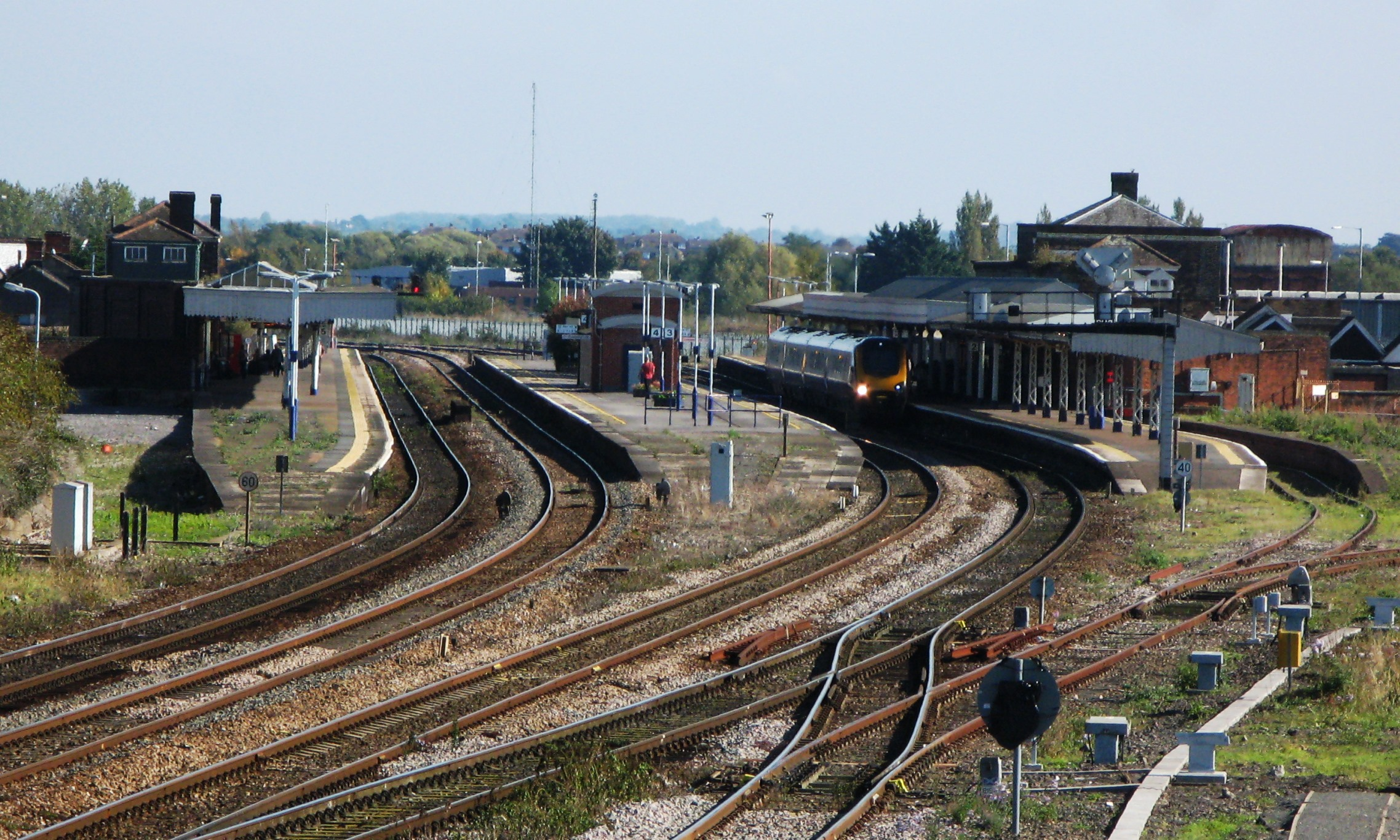
Seen from the "Forty Steps" footbridge, which crosses the line (and many former sidings) at the west end. Platform 5 is on the left, while a CrossCountry train to Plymouth is at platform 2.

The station is situated on an embankment and a bridge above road level. The ticket office is at ground level on the north side although the town centre lies to the south of the station, about 1 mile (1.6 km) away. There is a car park on both sides of the station and bus services to the town centre call at a bus stop in front of the ticket office; those from the town call at a stop on the main road that passes beneath the station. The south block is a Grade II listed building.

Platform 5 is situated above the ticket office and is the main platform used by trains towards London Paddington, Bristol Temple Meads and the north; the station buffet is situated here. The east-facing bay platform 6 is beyond this; it only sees occasional use nowadays, mainly being used for local trains towards Bristol.

In the centre of the station is an island platform. The face on the north side is platform 4, which can be used by similar trains to platform 5. The face on the south side is platform 3, which is also used for services towards Exeter St Davids, but is used mainly for terminating services from the Bristol direction that can also start back from here.

Platform 2 is used for services to Exeter and beyond. Trains can also start from this platform towards London and Bristol, if required. At the north end is the bus shelter for rail-link buses to Minehead; it has level access from a second car park.

Platform 1 is another bay, at the west end of platform 2. This is not signalled for use by passenger trains but is sometimes used for stabling. Behind this are some sidings used by the engineers' department for stabling on-track plant and the headshunt for Fairwater Yard. This area also housed the station's engine shed but this closed many years ago, although the last remains were only demolished in 2012.

Terminating trains from Bristol that need to cross to platform 2 or 3 have to run forward towards Fairwater and then return to the station once the driver has changed ends. To reach platform 6, they have to make this move and then run right through the station, the driver change ends and then reverses into platform 6. First Great Western proposed that alterations be made to the layout at the east end of the station to allow terminating trains from Bristol to run straight into platform 6. The shunting of trains across the layout at the west end of the station has long been a Taunton feature. In the days of trains to Minehead, Barnstaple and local stations to Exeter St Davids, terminating trains were drawn back from the up-side platforms, via various sidings, and then returned to the down-side departure platforms; pilot locomotives were provided to assist in the days of hauled stock.

== Services ==
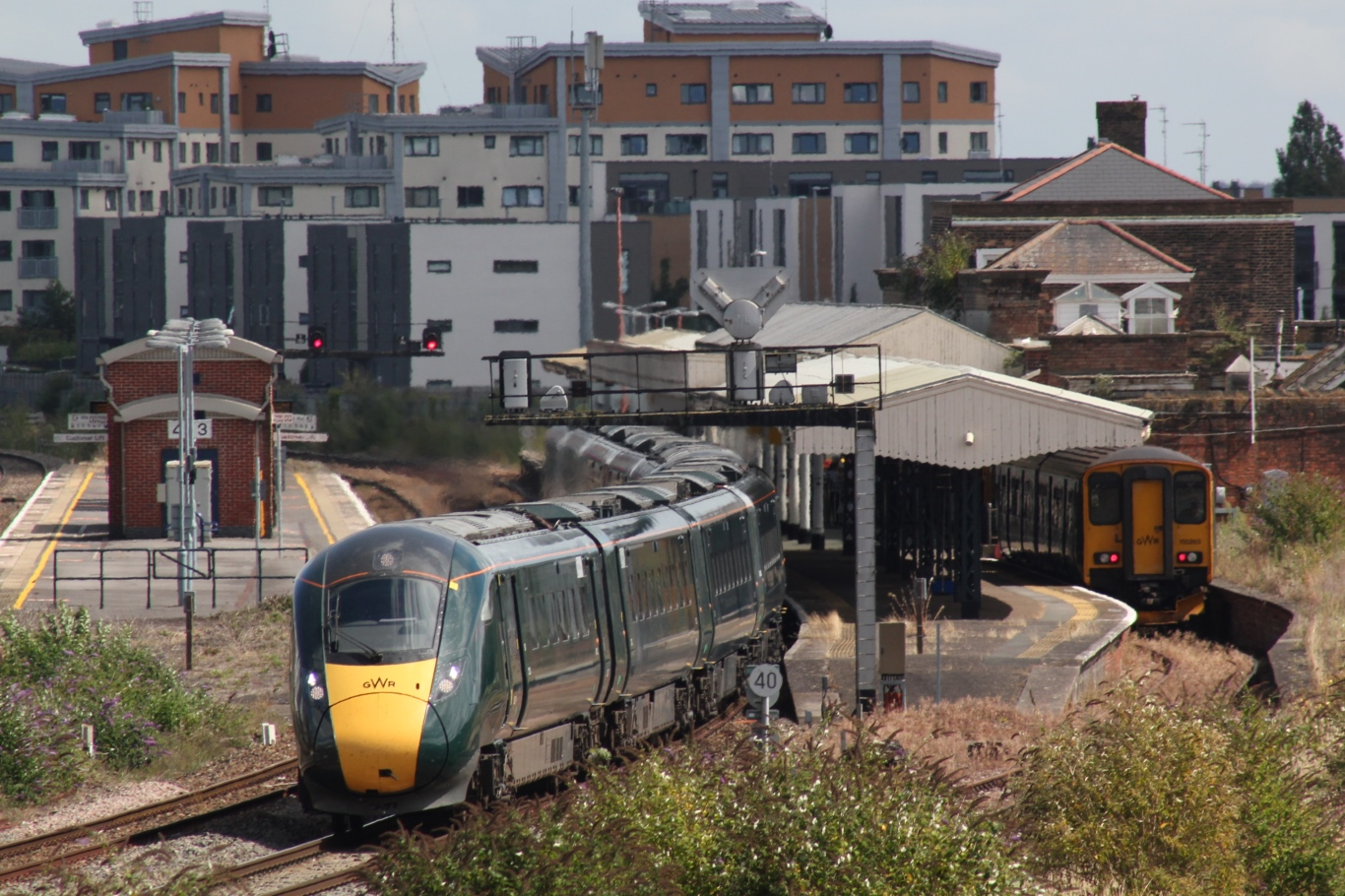
A ten-coach GWR Class 802 leaving with a London Paddington to Penzance service. The Class 150 in platform 1 is working a special service to Bishops Lydeard

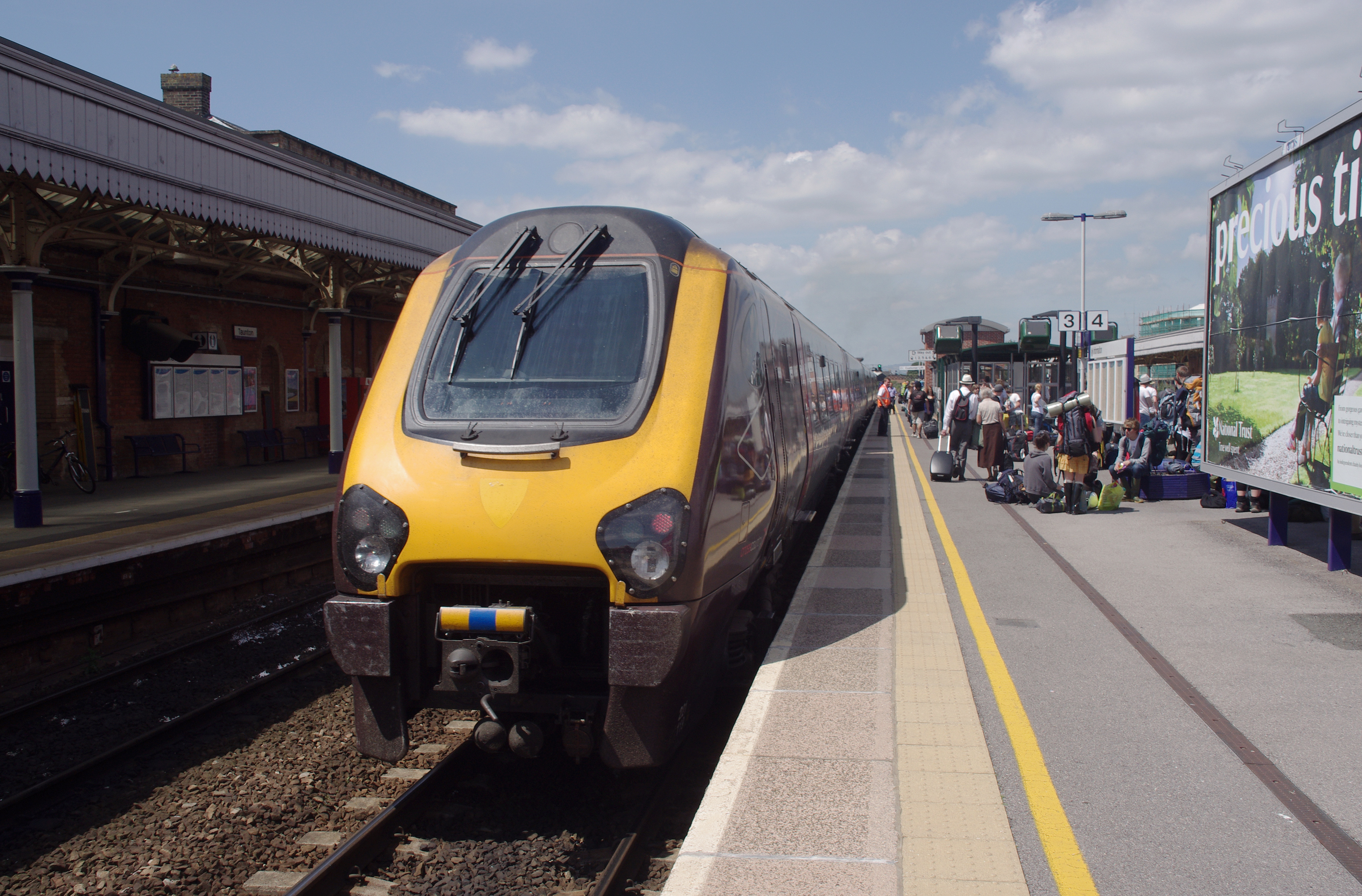
A CrossCountry Class 221 operating a service to Plymouth

Great Western Railway operates services between London Paddington and destinations including Exeter St Davids, Paignton, Plymouth and Penzance, including the overnight Night Riviera sleeper service. Some of these services run non-stop between Taunton and Reading. It also provides an hourly service from Cardiff Central and Bristol Temple Meads, via Weston-super-Mare, some of which continue to Exeter St Davids, Plymouth or Penzance.

CrossCountry operates services during the daytime between Edinburgh Waverley or Manchester Piccadilly, and Paignton or Plymouth. Some services extend in the north to Glasgow Central and Aberdeen, and in the south to Penzance.

Preceding station	National Rail	Following station
Tiverton Parkway or Exeter St Davids	Great Western Railway; London Paddington to South West	Castle Cary or Reading
Terminus	Great Western Railway; Cardiff and Bristol to Exeter and Penzance	Bridgwater
Tiverton Parkway	Great Western Railway; Cardiff and Bristol to Exeter and Penzance	Bridgwater
Tiverton Parkway	CrossCountry; Scotland and Northern England-Devon and Cornwall	Bristol Temple Meads
Tiverton Parkway	CrossCountry; Scotland and Northern England-Devon and Cornwall	Weston-super-Mare (Limited service)
Preceding station	Heritage railways	Following station
Norton Fitzwarren towards Minehead	West Somerset Railway Special events only	Terminus

=== Future services ===
Go-op, a co-operatively owned open-access train operating company, have proposed to operate services between Swindon, Taunton and Weston-super-Mare. In November 2024, the Office of Rail and Road (ORR) gave conditional approval for the proposed services subject to financial and rolling stock requirements, to begin no later than December 2026.

Lumo, a British open-access operator owned by FirstGroup that already operates services on the East Coast Main Line, has submitted an application to the ORR to operate five return services each day between London and Paignton, via Bristol Temple Meads, including a stop at Taunton. The new service will commence in 2028 if approved by the ORR.

== Fairwater Yard ==
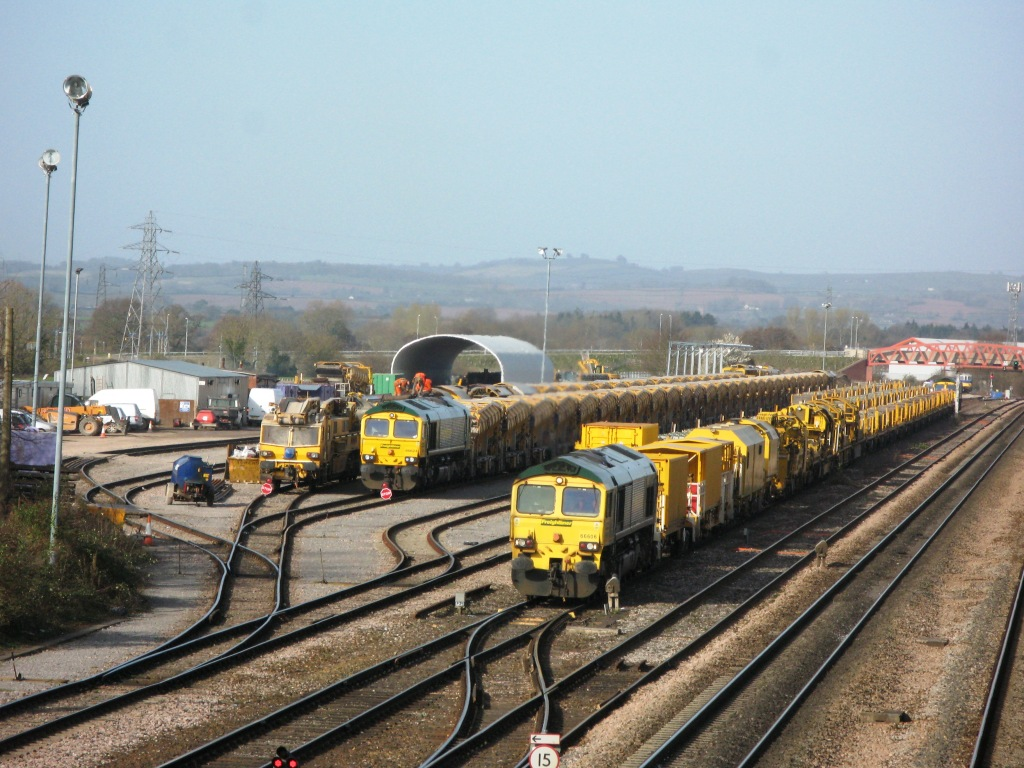
Freightliner Class 66 locomotives in Fairwater Yard

A marshalling yard was opened to the west of the station on 30 July 1946. It was used for many years by the British Railways' Civil Engineer and was home to a Ruston & Hornsby 0-6-0 diesel shunter, PWM652. After the end of this permanent way work, the sidings were little used; it was mainly a place to store unwanted or damaged wagons.

During 2006, the sidings were relaid and were returned to use in January 2007. Fairwater is now the home for a High Output Track Renewal System. This is engaged on renewal of track on the Great Western Main Line west of Swindon, the Reading to Exeter Main Line and the Bristol to Taunton line. The equipment based in the yard at that time was a Plasser & Theurer High Output Ballast Cleaner, a Matisa High Output Track Renewal Train and smaller on-track plant. The Matisa Track Renewal Train was removed from Fairwater Yard in April 2012, after it had completed its need for use in the South West.

== Taunton Concrete Works ==
Taunton Concrete Works, situated to the north of the line east of the station, cast items for the railway such as bridge beams, platform components, cable troughs and fence posts. The facility was closed in 1994.
