= Castle Cary railway station =

Railway station in Somerset, England

Castle Cary
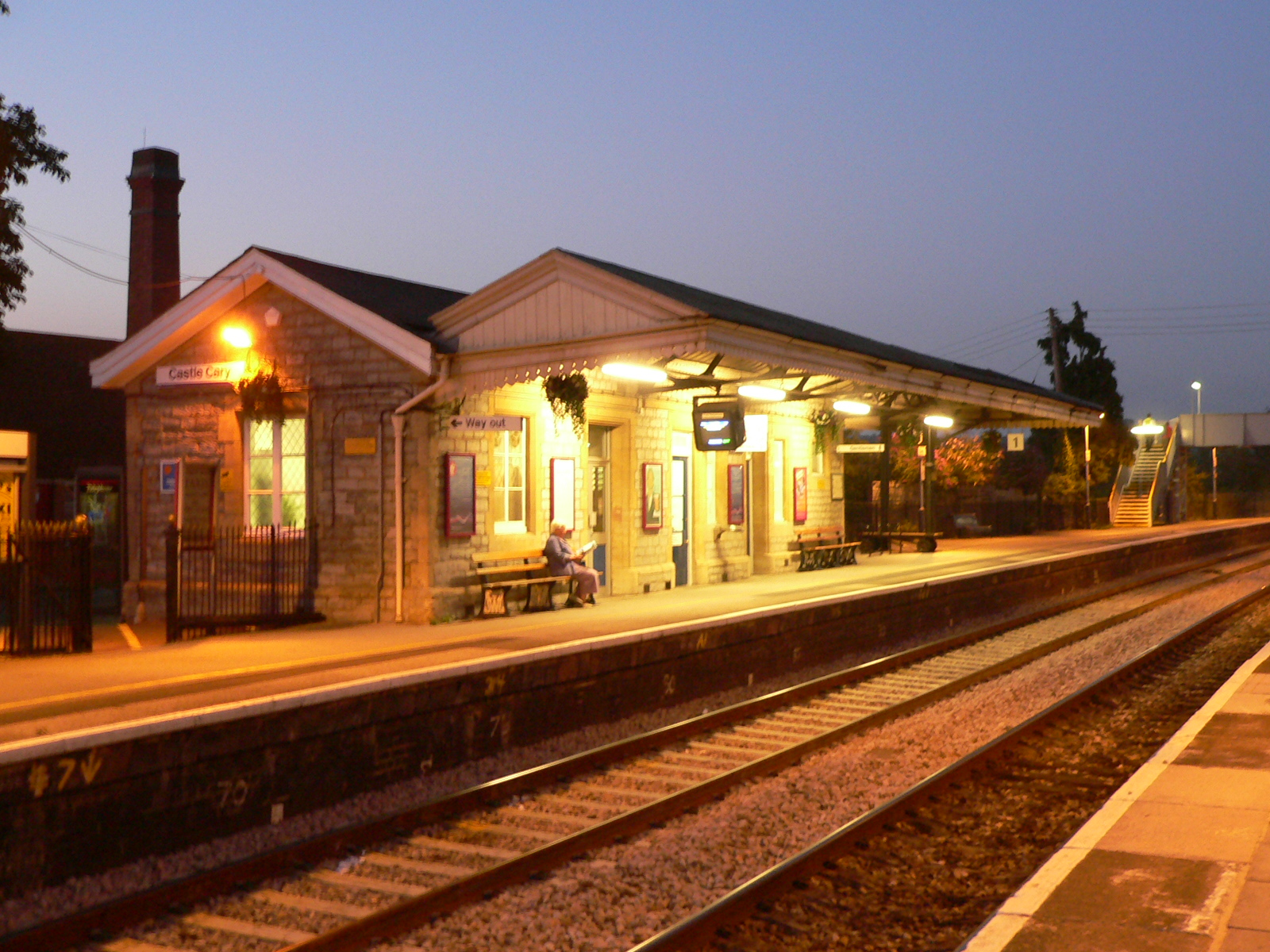
- The main station buildings on platform 1

General information
- Location: Castle Cary, Somerset; England
- Coordinates: 51.0996°N 2.5241°W
- Grid reference: ST634335
- Manager: Great Western Railway
- Platforms: 3

Other information
- Station code: CLC
- Classification: DfT category D

History
- Original company: Great Western Railway

Key dates
- 1 September 1856: Opened

Passengers
- 2021/22: ▲0.240 million
- Interchange: ▲30,667
- 2022/23: ▲0.312 million
- Interchange: ▲37,749
- 2023/24: ▼0.310 million
- Interchange: ▲47,776
- 2024/25: ▲0.355 million
- Interchange: ▲84,303
- 2025/26: ▲0.420 million
- Interchange: ▼54,160
Location
Notes
- Passenger statistics from the Office of Rail and Road

Castle Cary railway station is on the Reading to Taunton line 115.25 miles (185.48 km) south west of London Paddington and the Heart of Wessex Line 47.75 miles (77 km) south of Bristol Temple Meads. The two routes share tracks between Westbury and Castle Cary stations, and are both operated by Great Western Railway (who operate the station), with occasional services run by South Western Railway. The station is 1 mile (1.6 km) north of the market town of Castle Cary and 5 miles (8 km) south of Shepton Mallet in a largely rural area of Somerset, England.

== History ==
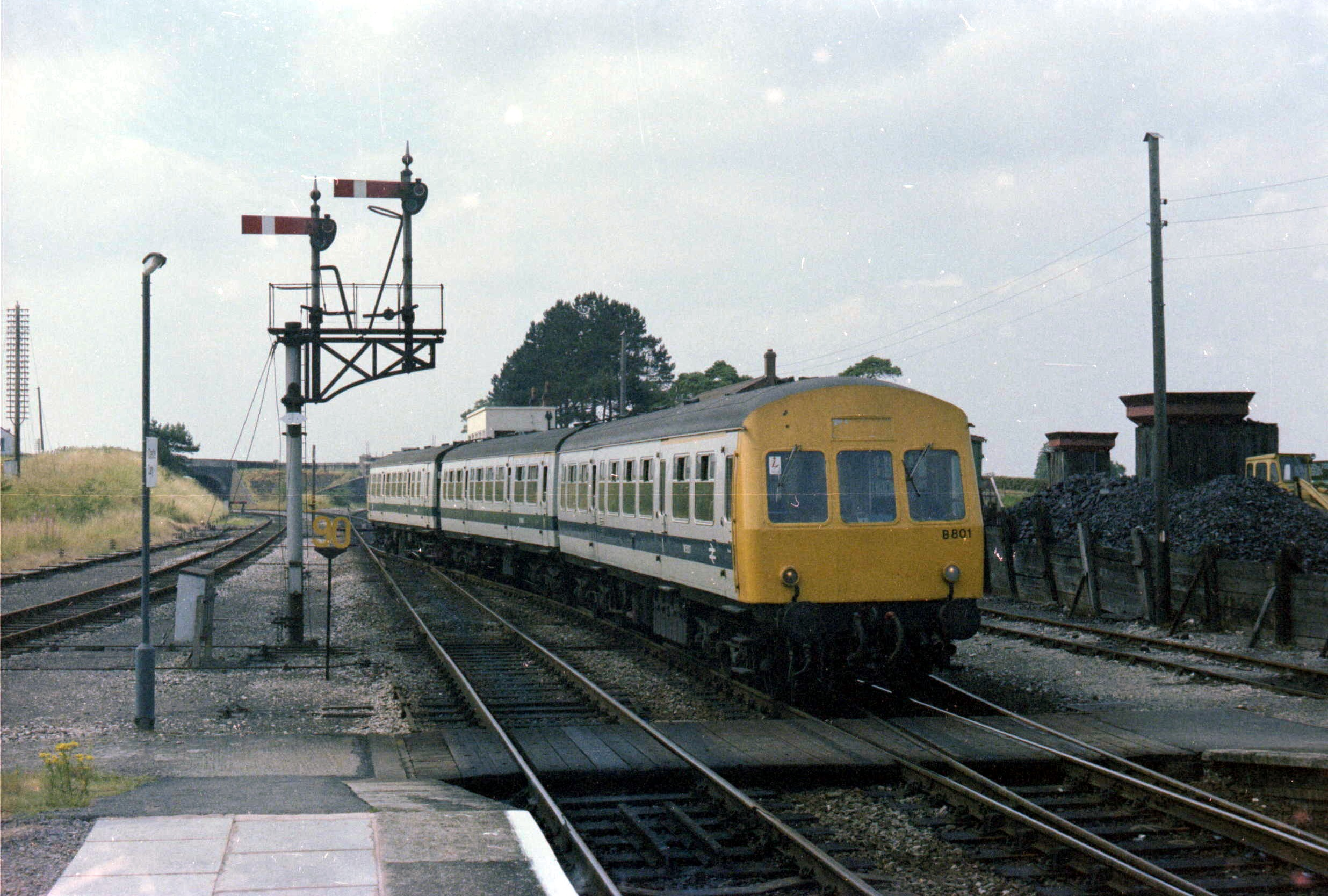
A train approaching the station in 1981

Castle Cary station was originally on the Wilts, Somerset and Weymouth Railway, a railway that linked the Great Western Railway (GWR) at Chippenham with Weymouth. The line was authorised in 1845, was acquired by the GWR in 1850, reached Castle Cary on 1 September 1856 (the day on which the station opened), and was completed throughout in 1857.

For the remainder of the 19th century, the GWR's principal route from London Paddington station to Exeter, Plymouth and Penzance was an indirect one via Bristol Temple Meads (the so-called Great Way Round). However, in 1895 the GWR directors announced that new lines were to be constructed to enable trains to reach Exeter, Plymouth and Penzance in a shorter time. The first stages involved improvements to the Berks and Hants Extension Railway and the Wilts, Somerset and Weymouth Line which reduced the distance from London to Castle Cary by 14.25 miles (23 km) and provided double track throughout.

This was followed by the construction of the Langport and Castle Cary Railway, which was opened from Castle Cary to the existing Bristol to Exeter line at Cogload Junction in 1906. This transformed Castle Cary from a station on a secondary north to south line, to one on a main east to west route. The route resulting from these improvements and extensions forms the current London to Penzance line.

The station was awarded the Small Station of the Year award in the National Rail Awards 2007.

The station underwent a major restoration in 2026, including reopening the ticket office, relocating the ticket office and repainting the station into original GWR colours, as well as new toilets.

== Location ==
Castle Cary station is the closest station to the site of the Glastonbury Festival, which is held near Pilton about 8 miles away. During the period of the festival additional trains are provided, and special buses are run from the station to the festival site. The station also serves events at the Royal Bath and West Showground, though these are not provided with extra trains. It is also the nearest main line station to the city of Wells , which lost its rail connection in 1963.

== Facilities ==
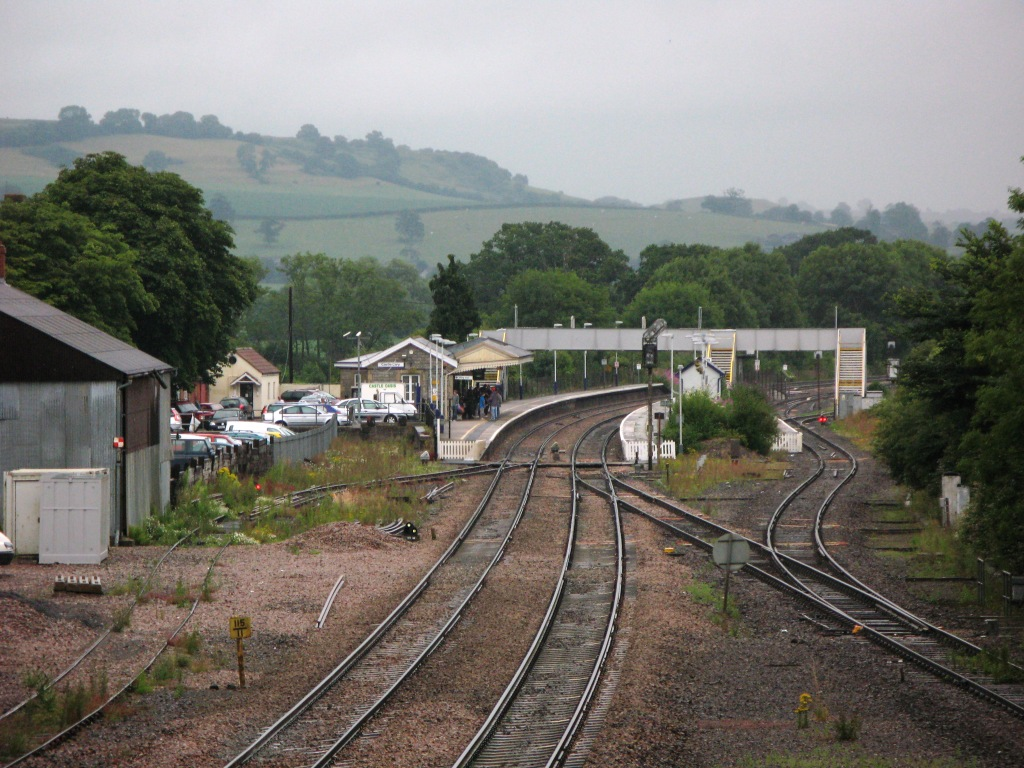
View from the West with the main line in the left foreground, and the Weymouth branch on the right

The station has three platforms. The main station facilities are located on the London bound platform 1, as well as the main station building and ticket office which is staffed until the afternoon. Toilet facilities are available on the concourse too. In front of the building is a car park for 100 cars, a bus stop and a taxi rank. Platform 2 serves west bound services to Taunton, Exeter, Plymouth and Penzance, whilst the shorter platform 3 can only be used by trains on the Bristol to Weymouth line. Immediately to the west of the station the Weymouth line diverges from the London to Penzance Line.

== Passenger volume ==
Passenger volume at Castle Cary
	2004–05	2005–06	2006–07	2007–08	2008–09	2009–10	2010–11	2011–12	2012–13	2013–14	2014–15	2015–16	2016–17	2017–18	2018–19	2019–20	2020–21	2021–22	2022–23	2023–24	2024–25
Entries and exits	183,133	193,954	171,136	227,250	231,750	235,000	259,220	276,312	233,992	244,846	245,296	241,466	244,242	251,974	222,474	278,246	50,758	240,462	311,814	309,574	354,740
Interchanges	10,323	11,293	12,193	12,037	12,717	15,005	18,006	29,769	32,278	28,085	26,055	68,294	75,422	39,349	37,593	32,119	10,265	30,667	37,749	47,776	84,303

The statistics cover twelve month periods that start in April.

== Services ==
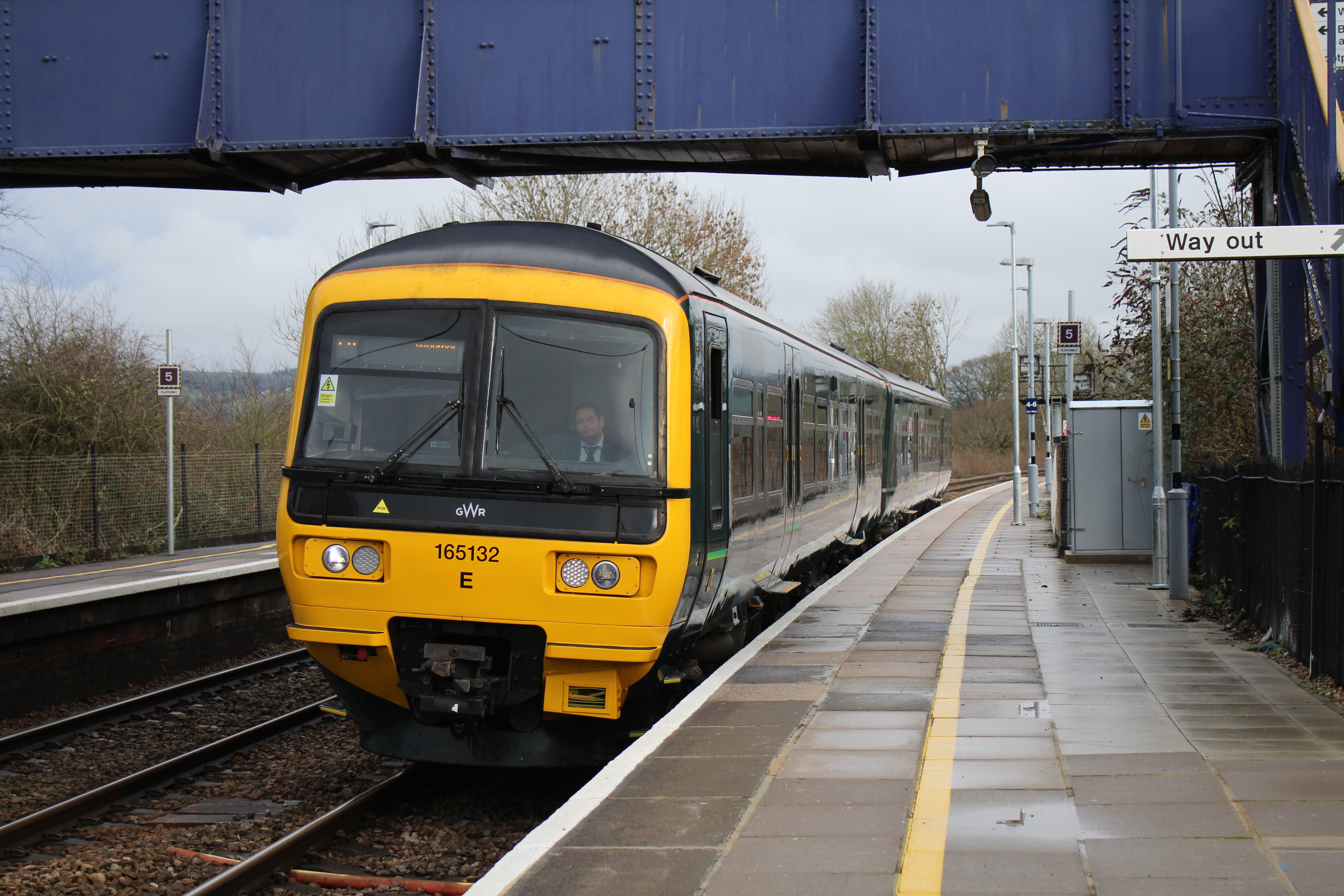
A Class 165 unit arrives with a Gloucester to Weymouth service

The Great Western Railway service between London Paddington and Exeter St Davids runs approximately every two hours, with 9 trains towards London Paddington per day, and 10 trains towards Exeter St Davids, although some services will reach stations such as Paignton and Plymouth. The service between Gloucester and Weymouth runs on a similar frequency, with 9 trains in each direction all weekdays except Friday, where only 8 operate northbound, however, some trains only operate between Bristol Temple Meads and Weymouth.

The South Western Railway service between London Waterloo and Yeovil Junction via Westbury and Salisbury is more irregular, however, as there are 6 trains towards London Waterloo throughout the day, but only 3 towards Yeovil Junction.

Preceding station	National Rail	Following station
Taunton	Great Western Railway; Reading to Taunton Line	Westbury
Yeovil Pen Mill	Great Western Railway; Heart of Wessex Line	Bruton
Yeovil Pen Mill	South Western Railway; Heart of Wessex Line	Bruton

== Community rail ==
The station, along with others on the Heart of Wessex Line, is part of the South Wessex Community Rail Partnership.

== Bibliography ==
- Quick, Michael (2023). Railway Passenger Stations in Great Britain: A Chronology (PDF) (5th ed.). London: Railway and Canal Historical Society.
