= Yeovil railway station =

Yeovil railway station may refer to several railway stations in Yeovil, Somerset, England:

- Yeovil Pen Mill railway station, on the Heart of Wessex Line (from Bristol Temple Meads to Weymouth).
- Yeovil Junction railway station, on the West of England Main Line 123 mi (198 km) south west of Waterloo station towards Exeter.
- The former Yeovil Town railway station, that closed on 1 March 1967.
