= Yeovil Show =

The Yeovil Show is an agricultural show held at the Yeovil Showground, Yeovil, Somerset, England.

== History ==
The show was last held in 1966.

The show made a comeback in the summer of 2016 after a break of 50 years. The event was organised by the Yeovil Agricultural Society, and reopened during a weekend in July 2016. After running for three years, the show was cancelled in 2019 due to the sale of Aldon Park (now part of Yeovil Country Park).

In 2017, the show was in the news after eleven 20kg blocks of cheddar cheese were stolen overnight, including the block that had won Best in Show. Most of the cheese was returned.

== Showground ==
The Yeovil Showground is used for events throughout the year.
