= The School for Scandal (disambiguation) =

The School for Scandal is a play by Richard Brinsley Sheridan first performed in 1777.

The School for Scandal may also refer to:

- The School for Scandal, a 1914 film adaptation directed by Kenean Buel
- The School for Scandal (1923 film), a silent film adaptation of the play
- The School for Scandal (1930 film), the first sound film adaptation of the play; a lost film
- The School van Scandal (1963 Broadway production), featuring John Gielgud and Ralph Richardson
- The School for Scandal (Barber), a 1931 overture by Samuel Barber
- "School for Scandal" (Murder, She Wrote), a 1985 television episode

== See also ==
- School for Scoundrels
