= Ninesprings =

Country park in Somerset, England

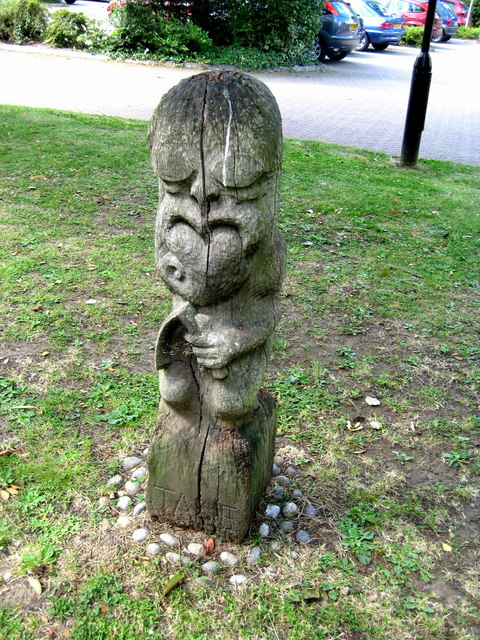
- Wyndham hill
- Interactive map of Ninesprings
- Type: public park
- Location: Yeovil, Somerset, England
- Coordinates: 50.9347°N 2.6324°W
- Area: 20 acres (8.1 ha)
- Operator: South Somerset

Ninesprings is a country park situated in the south east of Yeovil, Somerset, the United Kingdom. It is the largest country park in South Somerset, spanning over 20 acres (8.1 ha).

The site lies on Yeovil Sands (a yellow micaceous sand) of the Upper Lias, in the Lower Jurassic Period of the Mesozoic Era, formed some 160 million years ago and includes several springs supplying small streams and ponds. It is believed to have been developed as an ornamental park, for the Aldon Estate, in the early nineteenth century and now forms a broad-leaved woodland with coniferous trees forming less than 10% of the total. The nationally rare Water Vole has been seen amongst the swans and other fauna at the site.

In 2007 £10,000 was received from the Big Lottery Fund's Breathing Places grant programme to enhance the environment and organise activities in the park. New Zealand artist Selwyn Price was commissioned by the local council to produce eight sculptures of Māori gods, which were placed between the carpark and the footpath at Ninesprings.

The main path of the walk, often referred to by locals as 'the yellow brick road', runs from BM Stores and the caravan park all the way to Pen Mill railway station on the other side of town. It follows the track bed of the former Great Western Railway route between Pen Mill and Yeovil Town railway station Notable landmarks along this path are Goldenstones leisure centre, the Ninesprings playground, the ski lodge, and Bowlplex/Cineworld.

Hills viewable from this walk include Tilly's Hill, Summerhouse Hill and Wyndham Hill.

== Gallery ==
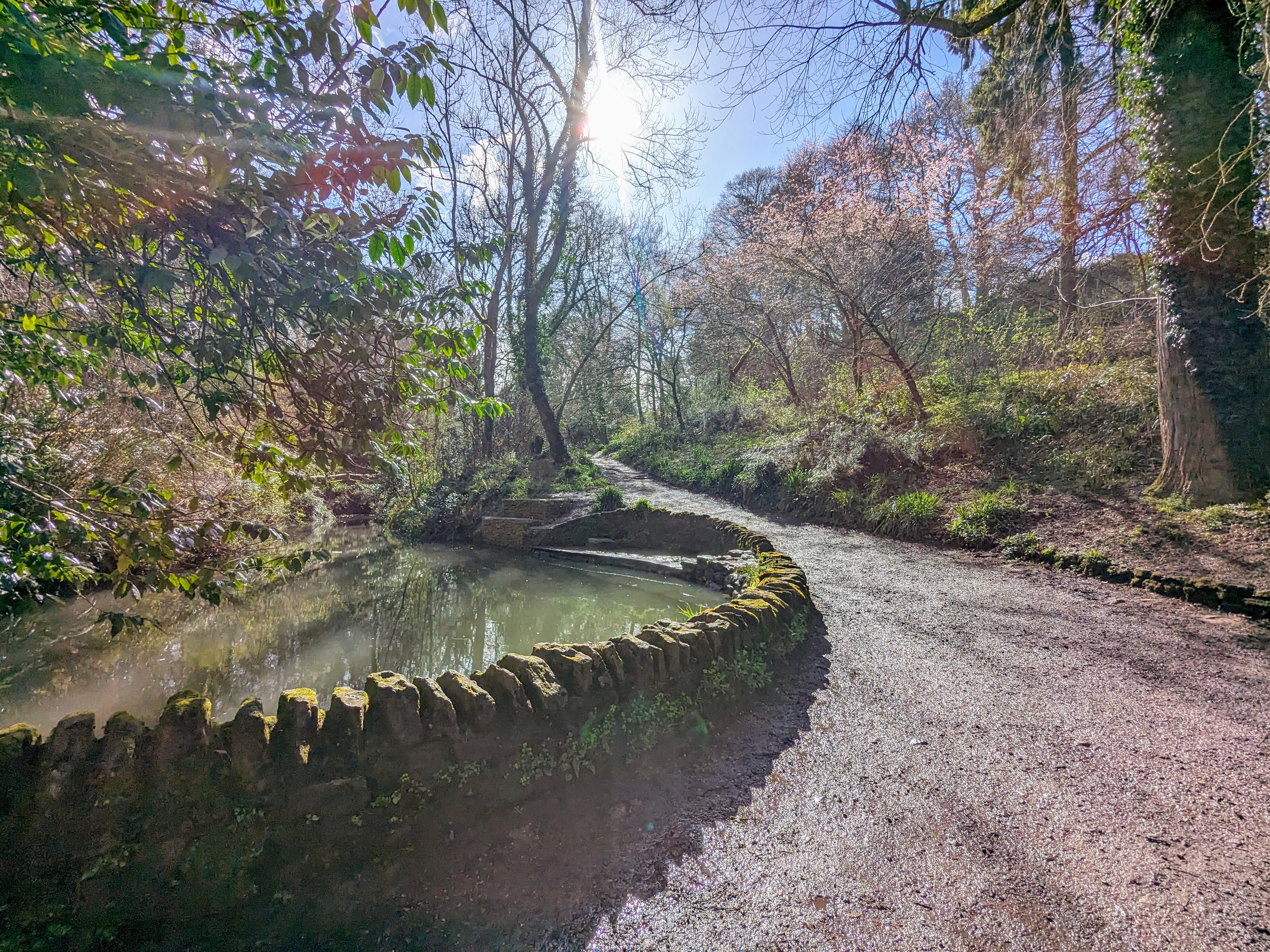
Ninesprings Country Park

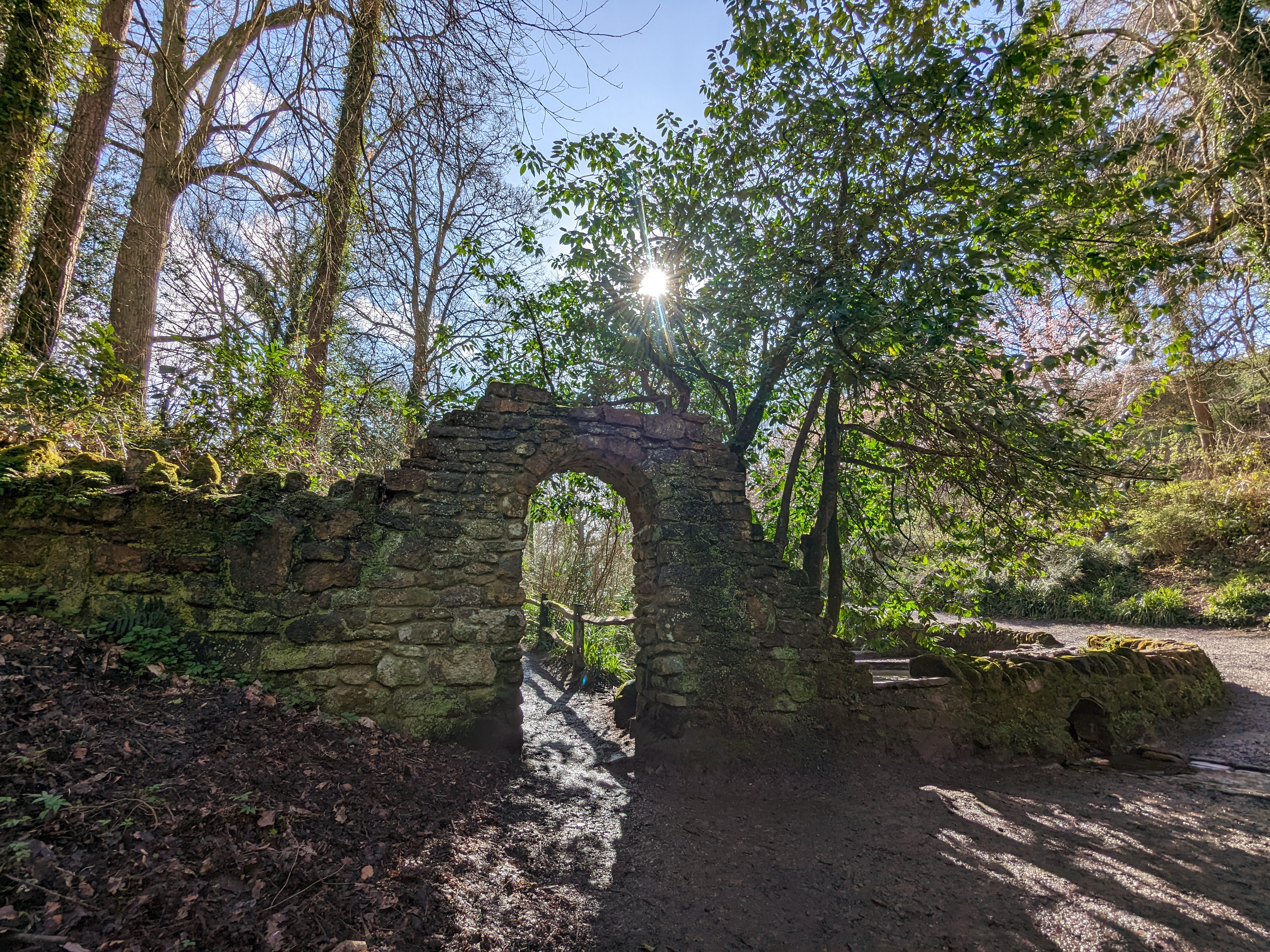
Arch Ruins at Ninesprings Country Park

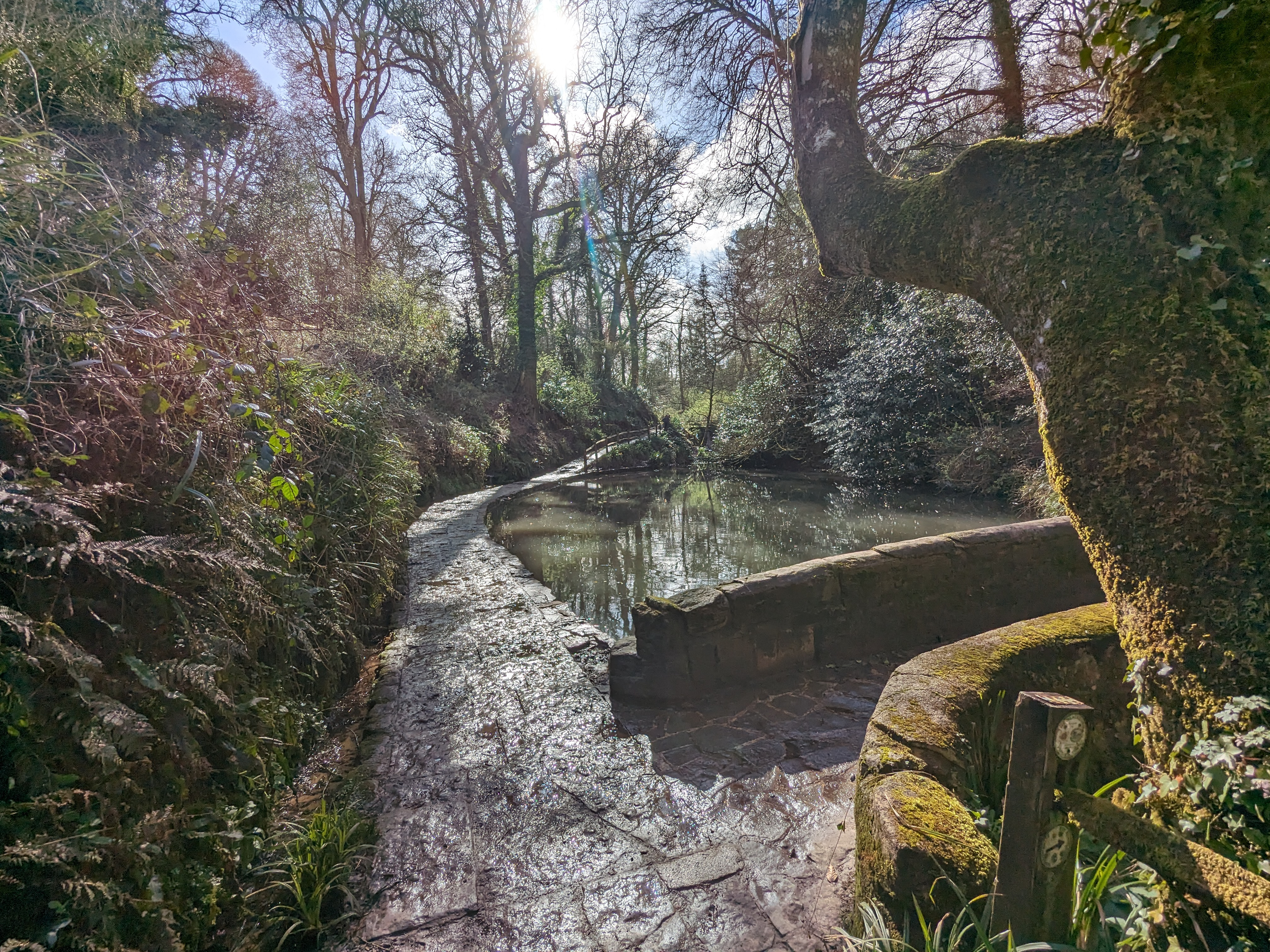
Lake at Ninesprings Country Park
