= Sparkford railway station =

Disused railway station in Sparkford, Somerset

Sparkford
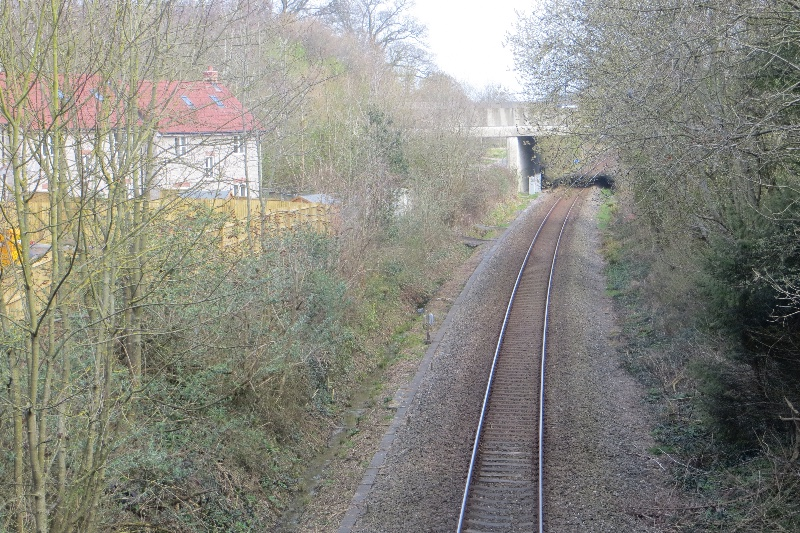

General information
- Location: Sparkford, Somerset; England
- Coordinates: 51.037°N 2.563°W
- Grid reference: ST606265
- Platforms: 2

Other information
- Status: Disused

History
- Original company: Great Western Railway

Key dates
- 1 September 1856: Opened
- 3 October 1966: Closed
Location

Sparkford railway station served the village of Sparkford, Somerset, England from 1856 to 1966 on the Heart of Wessex Line.

== History ==
The station opened on 1 September 1856 by the Great Western Railway. It closed to both passengers and goods traffic on 3 October 1966.

Preceding station	Historical railways	Following station
Castle Cary	Great Western Railway; Heart of Wessex Line	Marston Magna; Line open, station closed
