= Marston Magna railway station =

Disused railway station in Marston Magna, Somerset

Marston Magna

General information
- Location: Marston Magna, Somerset; England
- Coordinates: 51.0002°N 2.57134°W
- Grid reference: ST600224
- Platforms: 2

Other information
- Status: Disused

History
- Original company: Great Western Railway

Key dates
- 1 September 1856: Opened as Marston
- 9 May 1895: Name changed to Marston Magna
- 3 October 1966: Closed
Location

Marston Magna railway station served the village of Marston Magna, Somerset, England from 1856 to 1966 on Heart of Wessex Line.

== History ==
The station opened as Marston on 1 September 1856 by the Great Western Railway. Its name was changed to Marston Magna on 9 May 1895. It closed to both passengers and goods traffic on 3 October 1966.

Preceding station	Historical railways	Following station
Sparkford; Line open, station closed	Great Western Railway; Heart of Wessex Line	Yeovil Pen Mill; Line and station open
