= Sutton Bingham Halt railway station =

Disused railway station in Somerset, England

Sutton Bingham Halt
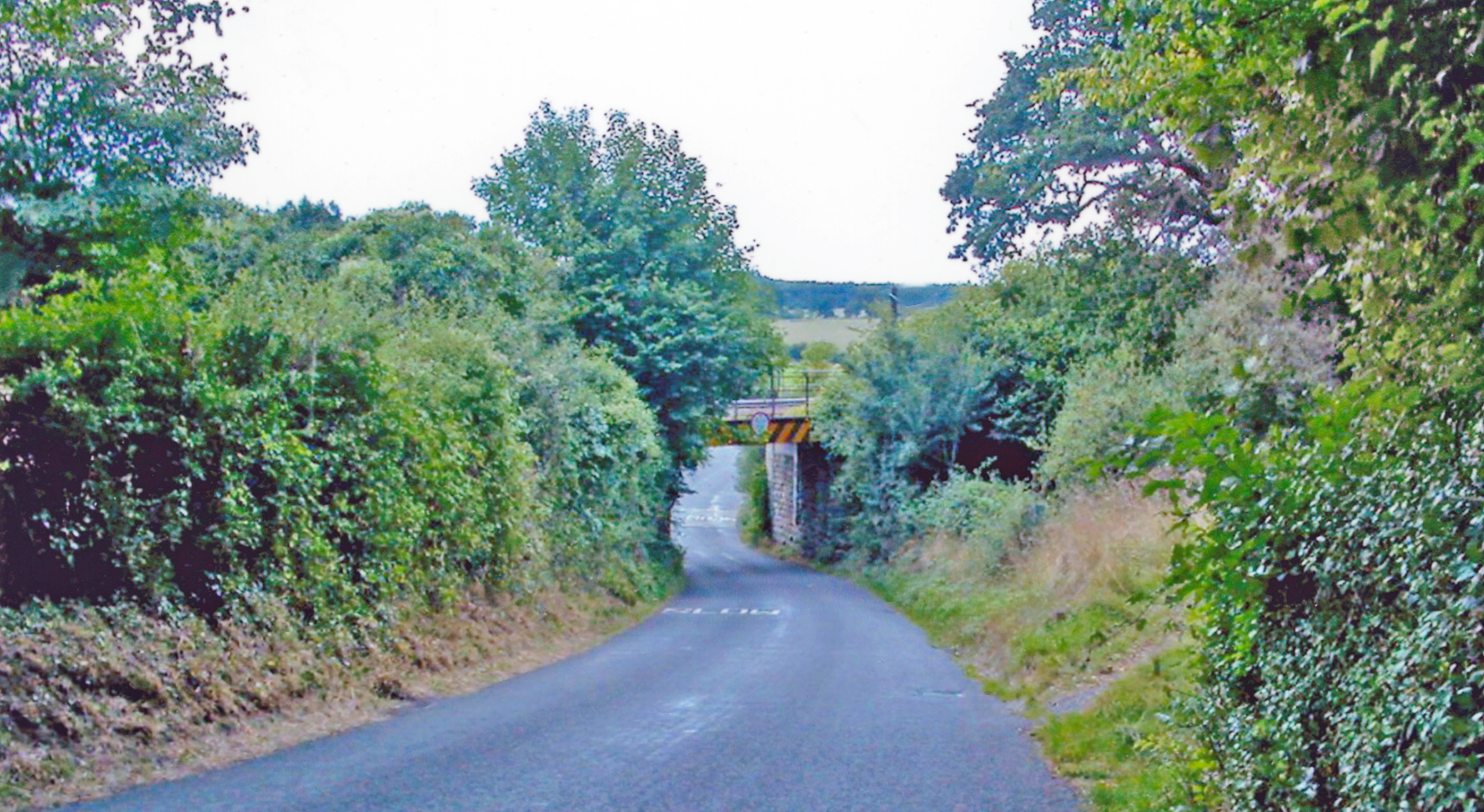
- The site of the station in 2013

General information
- Location: Sutton Bingham, Somerset; England
- Coordinates: 50.9003°N 2.6427°W
- Grid reference: ST549114
- Platforms: 2

Other information
- Status: Disused

History
- Original company: London and South Western Railway
- Pre-grouping: London and South Western Railway
- Post-grouping: Southern Railway

Key dates
- 19 July 1860: Opened
- 1 April 1960: Goods services withdrawn
- 1 August 1960: Name changed to Sutton Bingham Halt
- 31 December 1962: Closed
Location

Sutton Bingham Halt railway station served the hamlet of Sutton Bingham, Somerset, England, from 1860 to 1962 on the West of England line.

== History ==
The station was opened on 19 July 1860 by the London and South Western Railway. It lost its goods services on 1 April 1960 and the suffix 'Halt' was added to its name on 1 August of the same year, although it was still staffed. It closed on 31 December 1962 but the signal box was still used until 1965.

== Stationmasters ==
The following table is based on newspaper reports, census records and railway employment records.

Name	Dates in office	Reason for leaving	Date of birth	Place of birth
Edward Brown	1860-1874	Promoted	1823	Midson, Berkshire
George Robert Henderson	1874-1880	Died	1822	St Marylebone, London
James Castleman	1880-1899	Died	1826	Sutton Scotney, Hampshire
Charles Gosling	1899-1909	Retired	1840	Long Burton, Dorset
Henry Badcock	1910-1923	Retired	1856	Pyworthy, Devon
William Rowden	1924-1932+	?	1868	Bow, Devon

Preceding station	Historical railways	Following station
Yeovil Junction; Line and station open	London and South Western Railway; West of England line	Crewkerne; Line and station open
