= Crewkerne railway station =

Railway station in Somerset, England

Crewkerne
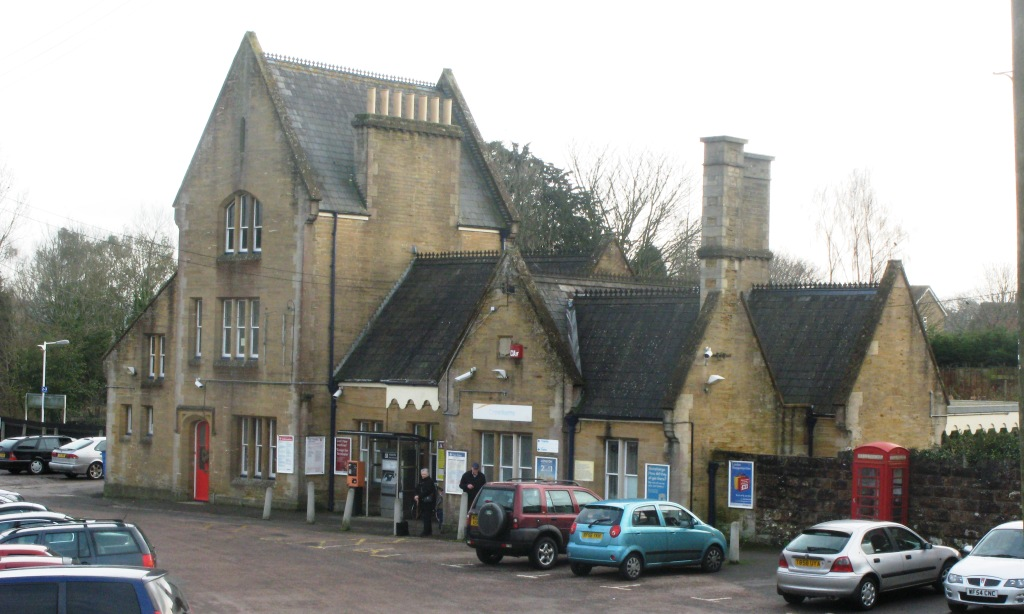

General information
- Location: Crewkerne, Somerset; England
- Coordinates: 50.8736°N 2.7771°W
- Grid reference: ST453085
- Manager: South Western Railway
- Platforms: 1

Other information
- Station code: CKN
- Classification: DfT category E

History
- Original company: London and South Western Railway
- Post-grouping: Southern Railway

Key dates
- 19 July 1860: Opened
- 7 May 1967: Line singled

Passengers
- 2021/22: ▲0.128 million
- 2022/23: ▲0.158 million
- 2023/24: ▲0.160 million
- 2024/25: ▲0.178 million
- 2025/26: ▼0.156 million

Listed Building – Grade II
- Feature: Crewkerne Railway Station
- Designated: 1 March 1973
- Reference no.: 1345931
Location
Notes
- Passenger statistics from the Office of Rail and Road

Crewkerne railway station is located in Misterton in Somerset, England, and serves the area around the town of Crewkerne. It is 131 miles 33 chains (211.5 km) from London Waterloo on the West of England Main Line to Exeter, between Yeovil Junction and Axminster. The main building is Grade II listed, and is surrounded by several other old railway buildings. The station is managed by South Western Railway, who operate all services.

== History ==
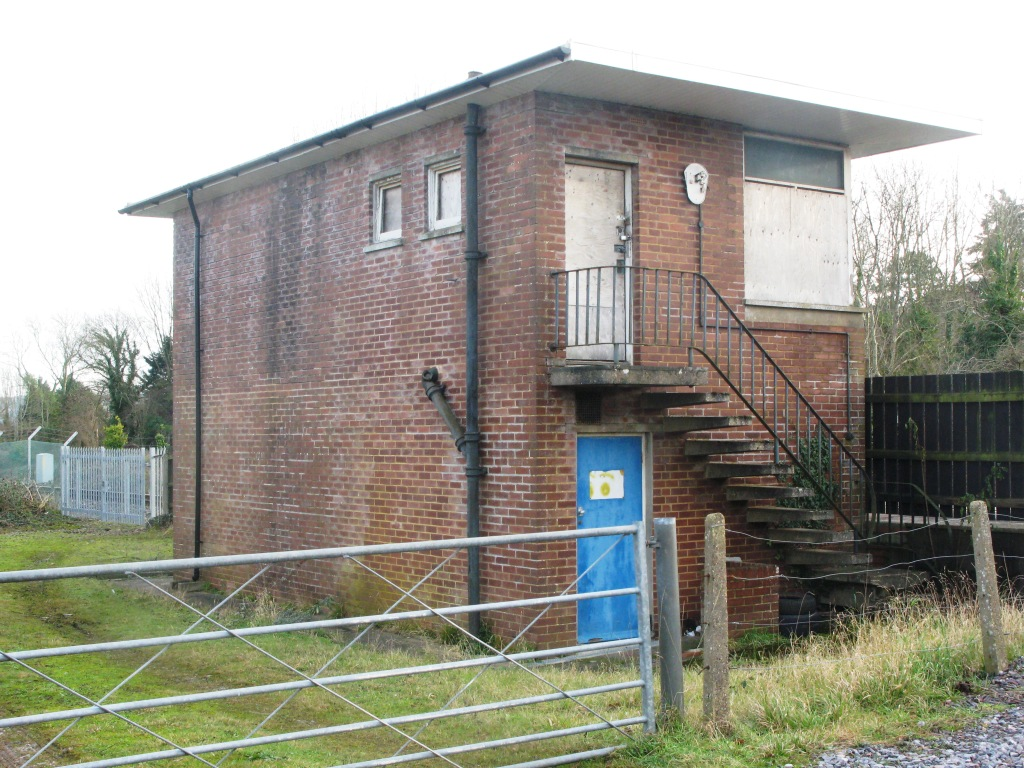
The signal box built in 1960, seen in December 2009

The station was opened on 19 July 1860 when the LSWR opened its Salisbury and Yeovil Railway. The main building was designed by Sir William Tite and has been designated as a Grade II listed building. A wooden signal box was erected in 1875 on the eastbound platform, just east of the main offices. A new signal box was built in 1960 a little to the east of the old one, which was then demolished, located between the old goods shed and the platforms.

On 7 May 1967 the 21.5 miles (34.6 km) section between Sherborne and Chard Junction was reduced to just a single track, although this has since been shortened to just 16.8 miles (27.0 km) between Yeovil Junction and Chard Junction, where there is a loop, followed by more single track to east of Axminster.

| Preceding station | Historical railways | Following station |
|---|---|---|
| Sutton Bingham Halt | London and South Western Railway (London Waterloo to Devon and Cornwall) | Chard Junction |

=== Accidents and incidents ===
On 24 April 1953 it was the scene of an accident when an axle of Merchant Navy Class 35020 Bibby Line broke while it was passing the station. This caused the platform canopy to be demolished.

== Location ==
The station is about a mile southeast of Crewkerne on the A356 road, which crosses the platform and railway on a bridge. The entrance and platform are on the north side of the line, which is climbing westwards at 1 in 80 (1.25%) to the 206-yard (188 m) Crewkerne Tunnel.

== Facilities ==
The station has a ticket office and ticket machine, a car park and cycle storage, a waiting room, benches and a help point.

== Passenger volume ==
There has consistently been more than 100,000 entries and exits recorded every year since 2010, and 150,000 since 2015 except during the COVID-19 pandemic in 2020 and 2021. Passenger numbers have continued to grow since then with 177,884 recorded in the reporting year 2024–2025.

Passengers by year
| Year (Note: The passenger data covers twelve month periods that start in April.) | Entries and exits |
|---|---|
| 2004–2005 | 97,021 |
| 2005–2006 | 91,754 |
| 2006–2007 | 93,213 |
| 2007–2008 | 98,515 |
| 2008–2009 | 99,416 |
| 2009–2010 | 99,764 |
| 2010–2011 | 114,946 |
| 2011–2012 | 124,722 |
| 2012–2013 | 123,410 |
| 2013–2014 | 131,160 |
| 2014–2015 | 141,812 |
| 2015–2016 | 155,696 |
| 2016–2017 | 162,362 |
| 2017–2018 | 165,210 |
| 2018–2019 | 164,344 |
| 2019–2020 | 158,950 |
| 2020–2021 | 45,674 |
| 2021–2022 | 127,508 |
| 2022–2023 | 157,562 |
| 2023–2024 | 160,042 |
| 2024–2025 | 177,884 |

== Services ==
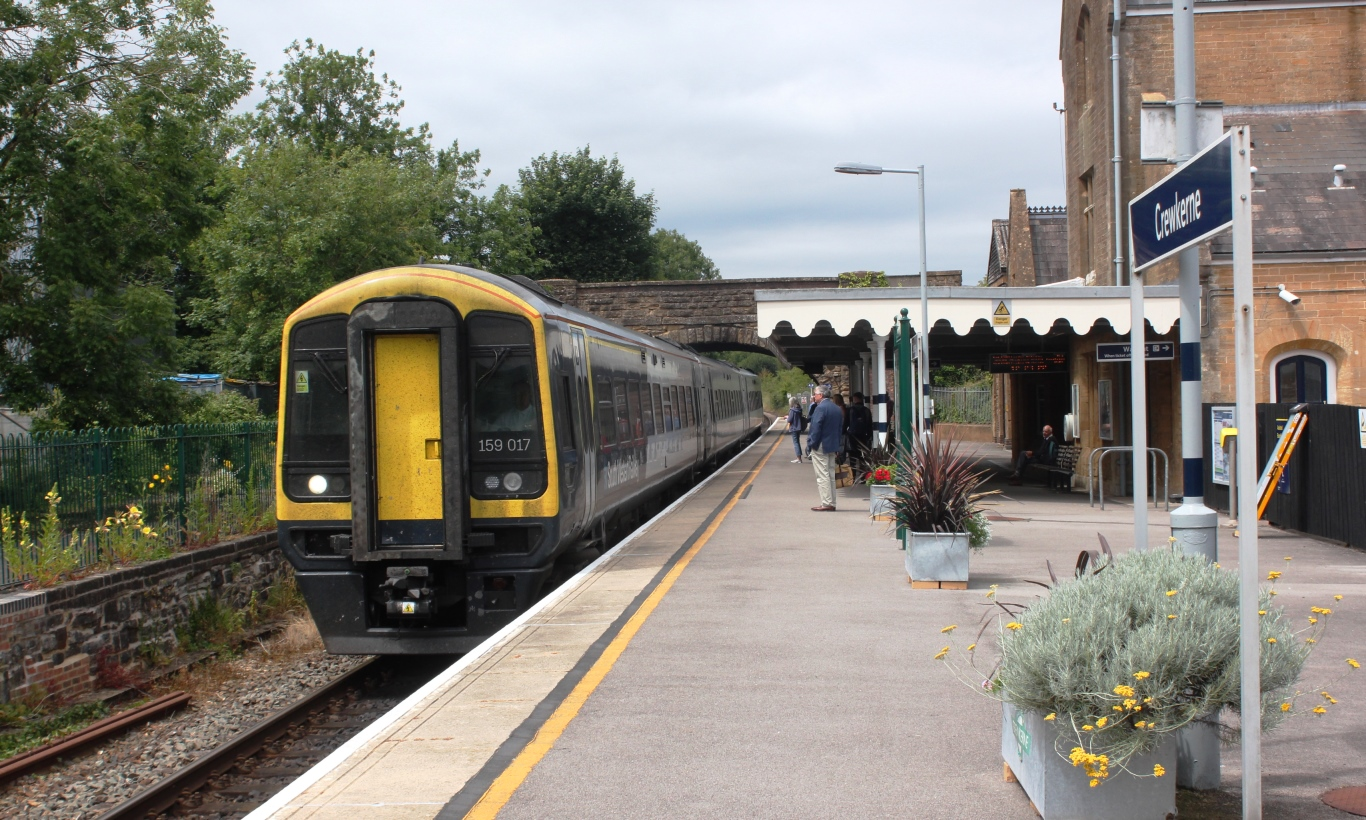
A SWR Class 159 for London Waterloo calls at Crewkerne in July 2022

Axminster is served by one South Western Railway train per hour in each direction on the route between London Waterloo and Exeter St Davids.

| Preceding station | National Rail | Following station |
|---|---|---|
| Axminster | South Western Railway (West of England Main Line) | Yeovil Junction |

== Community rail ==
The station is the westernmost station part of the Blackmore Community Rail Partnership.

== See also ==
- Southern Railway routes west of Salisbury

== Bibliography ==
- Quick, Michael (2023). Railway Passenger Stations in Great Britain: A Chronology (PDF) (5th ed.). London: Railway and Canal Historical Society.
