= Yeovil =

Town in Somerset, England

Coordinates: 50.942°N 2.633°W

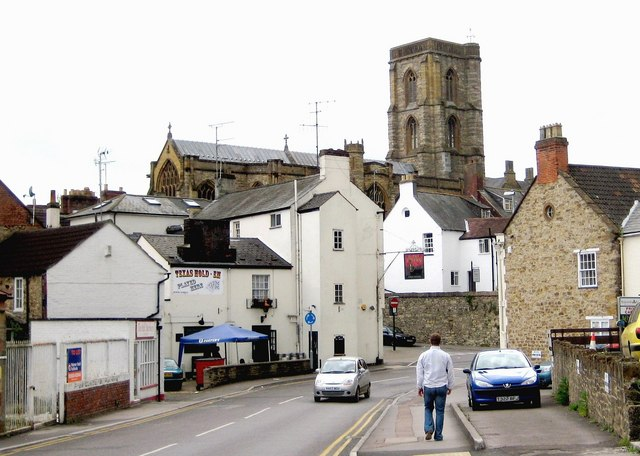
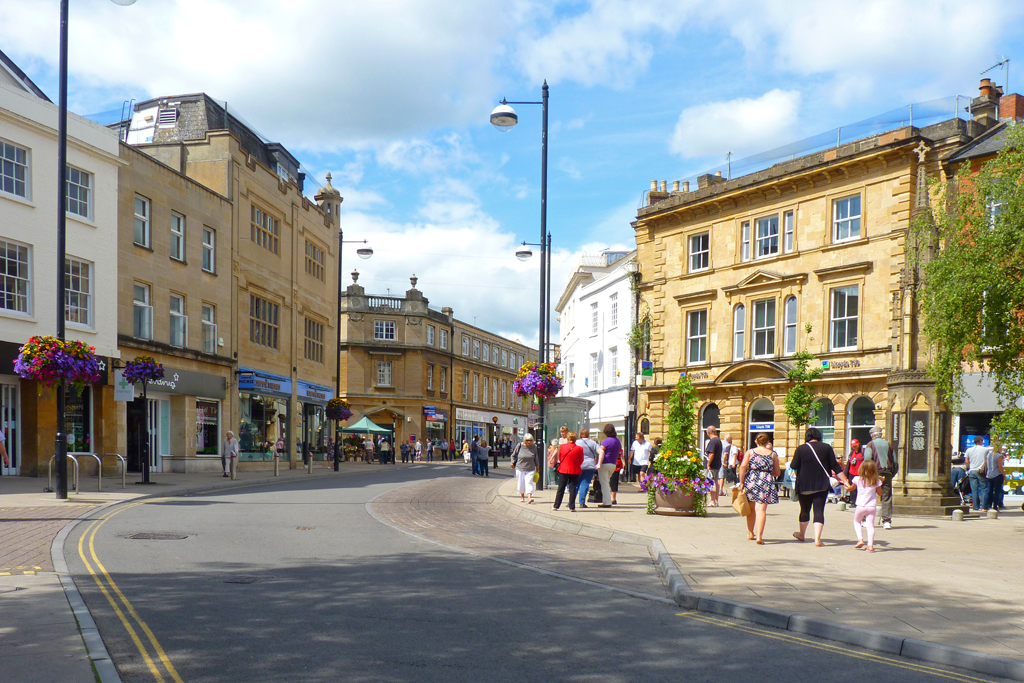
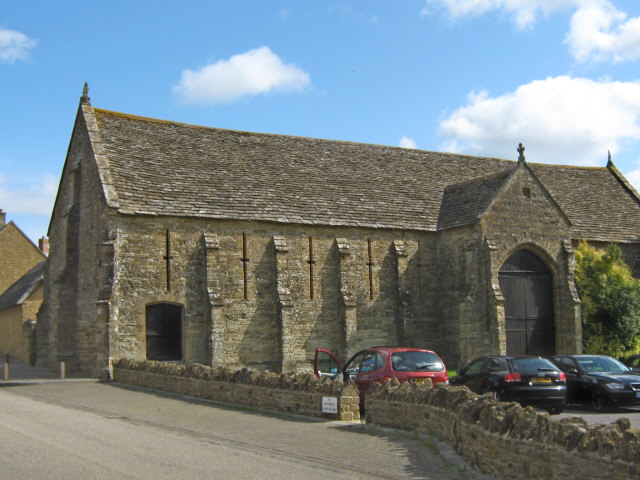
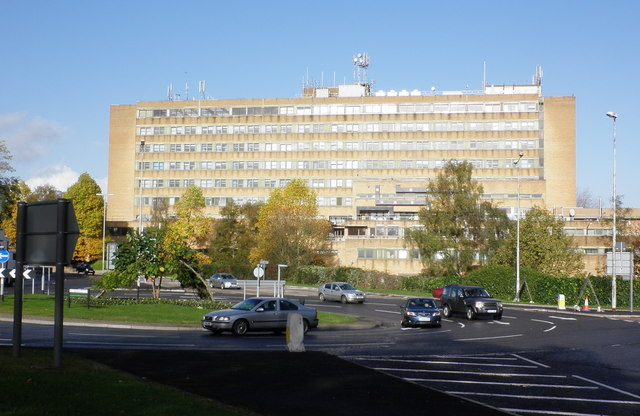
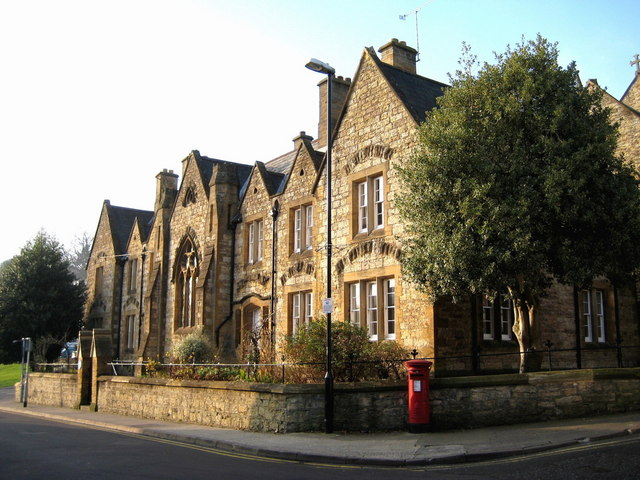
- From top to bottom right: Church of St John The Baptist, High Street, Abbey Barn, Yeovil Hospital and Woborn's Almshouse

- Location within Somerset
- Population: 31,633 (Parish, 2021); 50,170 (Built-up area, 2021)
- OS grid reference: ST556160
- Unitary authority: Somerset Council
- Ceremonial county: Somerset
- Region: South West
- Country: England
- Sovereign state: United Kingdom
- Post town: YEOVIL
- Postcode district: BA20, BA21, BA22
- Dialling code: 01935
- Police: Avon and Somerset
- Fire: Devon and Somerset
- Ambulance: South Western
- UK Parliament: Yeovil

Yeovil (/ˈjoʊvɪl/ YOH-vil) is a town and civil parish in Somerset, England. It is close to the county's southern border with Dorset, 126 miles (203 km) west of London, 42 miles (68 km) south of Bristol, 6 miles (10 km) west of Sherborne and 28 miles (45 km) east of Taunton. At the 2021 census, the parish had a population of 31,633, and the built-up area, which extends into the neighbouring parishes of Brympton, West Coker, and Yeovil Without, had a population of 50,170.

The aircraft and defence industries, which developed in the 20th century, made it a target for German bombing in the Second World War; they are still major employers. Yeovil Country Park, which includes Ninesprings, is one of several open spaces with educational, cultural and sporting facilities. Religious sites include the 14th-century Church of St John the Baptist. The town is on the A30 and A37 roads and has two railway stations.

== History ==
Archaeological surveys have yielded Palaeolithic burial and settlement sites mainly to the south of the modern town, particularly in Hendford, where a Bronze Age golden torc (twisted collar) was found.

Yeovil is on the main Roman road from Dorchester to the Fosse Way at Ilchester. The route of the old road is aligned with the A37 from Dorchester, Hendford Hill, Rustywell, across the Westland site, to Larkhill Road and Vagg Lane, rejoining the A37 at the Halfway House pub in the Ilchester Road. The Westland site has evidence of a small Roman town. There were several Roman villas (estates) in the area. Finds have been made at East Coker, West Coker and Lufton.

=== Medieval times ===
Yeovil was first named in a Saxon charter dated 880 as Gifle. It derives from the Common Brittonic river-name gifl "forked river", an earlier name of the River Yeo.

The estate was bequeathed in the will of King Alfred the Great to his youngest son Aethelweard. It was recorded in the Domesday Book as Givele, a thriving market community. The parish of Yeovil was part of the Stone Hundred. After the Norman Conquest, the manor, later known as Hendford, was granted to the Count of Eu and his tenant Hugh Maltravers, whose descendants became Earls of Arundel and held the lordship until 1561. In 1205 it was granted a charter by King John. By the 14th century, the town had gained the right to elect a portreeve.

The Black Death exacted a heavy toll, killing about half the population.

In 1499, a major fire destroyed many wooden, thatch-roofed buildings in the town. Yeovil suffered further fires in 1620 and 1643.

=== Ownership ===
After the dissolution of the monasteries, the lord of the manor was the family of John Horsey of Clifton Maybank from 1538 to 1610, followed by the Phelips family until 1846, when it passed to the Harbins of Newton Surmaville. Babylon Hill across the River Yeo to the south east of the town was the site of a minor skirmish, the Battle of Babylon Hill, during the Civil War, which resulted in the Earl of Bedford's Roundheads forcing back Sir Ralph Hopton's Cavaliers to Sherborne.

=== Development ===
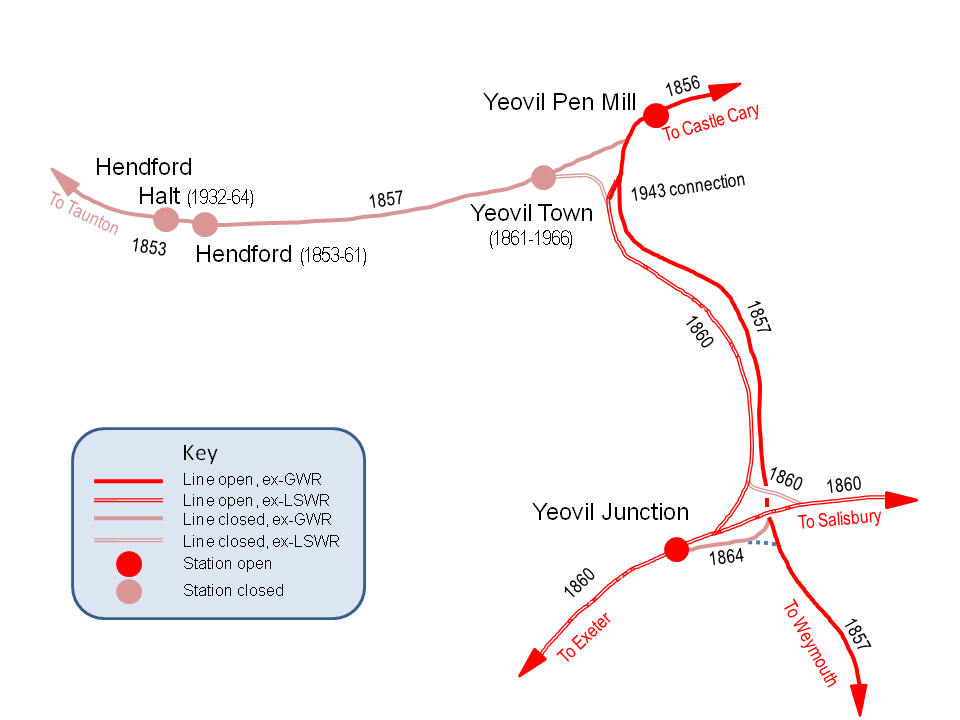
Map of railways around Yeovil

In the 1800s, Yeovil was a glove-making centre and the population grew quickly. In the mid-19th century it became linked to the rest of Britain by a complex of railway lines, with competition between the 7 ft (2,134 mm) broad gauge lines of the Great Western Railway (GWR) and the 4 ft 8 1/2 in (1,435 mm) standard gauge lines of the London and South Western Railway (LSWR).

The town's first railway was a branch line from the Bristol and Exeter Railway near Taunton to a terminus at Hendford on the western side of the town, which opened on 1 October 1853; as an associate of the GWR, this was a broad-gauge line. The GWR itself opened Yeovil Pen Mill railway station, on the east side of the town as part of its route from London on 1 September 1856, extended to Weymouth on 1 January 1857), and the original line from Taunton connected with this. The LSWR route from London reached Hendford on 1 June 1860, but a month later the town was by-passed by an extension of the LSWR to Exeter. A new station at Yeovil Junction was provided south of the town from where passengers could catch a connecting service to Hendford. On 1 June 1861, passenger trains were withdrawn from Hendford and transferred to a new, more central, Yeovil Town railway station.

In the early 20th century, Yeovil had around 11,000 inhabitants and was dominated by the defence industry, making it a target of German raids during World War II. The worst bombing was in 1940 and continued until 1942. During that time 107 high-explosive bombs fell on the town, 49 people died, 68 houses were totally destroyed and 2,377 damaged.

Industrial businesses developed around the Hendford railway goods station to such a degree that a small Hendford Halt was opened on 2 May 1932 for passengers, but the growth of road transport and a desire to rationalise the rail network led to half of the railway stations in Yeovil being closed in 1964. First to go was Hendford Halt, closed on 15 June along with the line to Taunton, then Yeovil Town closed on 2 October. Long-distance trains from Pen Mill were withdrawn on 11 September 1961, leaving only Yeovil Junction with a service to London, but the service between there and Pen Mill, the two remaining stations, was also withdrawn from 5 May 1968.

As a former centre of Britain's leather industry, the town is post-industrial in character. Journalist John Harris, for instance, described the towns Taunton, Yeovil and Bridgwater as a "post-industrial, hardscrabble place that contain[s] 19 of the council wards in the 20% of English areas classed as the most deprived."

== Geography ==
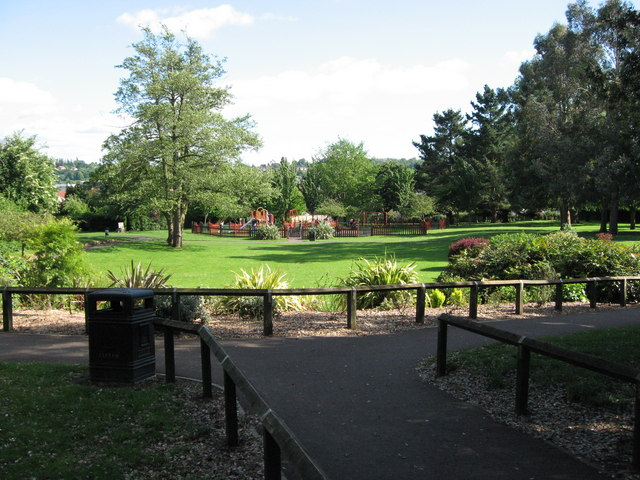
Preston Park

Yeovil is in the south of Somerset, close to the border with Dorset and in the centre of the Yeovil Scarplands, a natural region of England. The suburbs include Summerlands, Hollands, Houndstone, Preston Plucknett, Penn Mill, New Town, Hendford, Old Town, Forest Hill, Abbey Manor, Great Lyde. Outlying villages include East Coker, West Coker, Hardington Mandeville, Evershot, Halstock, Stoford, Barwick, Sutton Bingham, Mudford and Yetminster. Other nearby villages include Bradford Abbas, Thornford Corscombe, Montacute (with Montacute House) and Pendomer. The village of Brympton, now almost a suburb of Yeovil, contains the medieval manor of Brympton d'Evercy. Tintinhull, also close to Yeovil, features the National Trust-owned Tintinhull House and Gardens.

Ninesprings Country Park is in the south-east near Penn Hill, linked by a cycle way along the route of the old railway to Riverside Walk, Wyndham Hill and Summerhouse Hill, forming the 40-hectare (99-acre) Yeovil Country Park.

=== Climate ===
Like the rest of South West England, Yeovil has a temperate climate generally wetter and milder than the rest of the country. The annual mean temperature is about 10 °C (50 °F) and shows seasonal and diurnal variation, but the sea has a modifying effect. January is the coldest month, with mean minimum temperatures between 1 and 2 °C (34 and 36 °F). July and August are the warmest months, with mean daily maxima around 22 °C (72 °F).

The south-west of England is in a favoured location for the Azores high pressure zone, when it extends north-eastwards towards the UK, particularly in summer. However, convective cloud often forms inland, especially near hills, reducing the number of hours of sunshine, whose annual average annual is about 1,700 hours.

Rainfall tends to be associated with Atlantic depressions or with convection. The Atlantic depressions are more vigorous in autumn and winter, when most of the rain that falls in the south-west is from that source. Average rainfall is about 725 millimetres (28.5 in). November to March have the highest mean wind speeds, with June to August having the lightest winds. The predominant wind direction is from the south-west.

Climate data for Yeovilton (1991–2020 normals, extremes 1964-present)
Month	Jan	Feb	Mar	Apr	May	Jun	Jul	Aug	Sep	Oct	Nov	Dec	Year
Record high °C (°F)	16.1 (61.0)	17.7 (63.9)	21.3 (70.3)	25.4 (77.7)	32.9 (91.2)	37.3 (99.1)	35.0 (95.0)	35.5 (95.9)	29.9 (85.8)	26.5 (79.7)	18.5 (65.3)	16.0 (60.8)	37.3 (99.1)
Mean daily maximum °C (°F)	8.6 (47.5)	9.0 (48.2)	11.2 (52.2)	13.9 (57.0)	17.1 (62.8)	19.9 (67.8)	21.9 (71.4)	21.6 (70.9)	19.2 (66.6)	15.3 (59.5)	11.5 (52.7)	9.0 (48.2)	14.9 (58.8)
Daily mean °C (°F)	5.3 (41.5)	5.4 (41.7)	7.1 (44.8)	9.2 (48.6)	12.3 (54.1)	15.1 (59.2)	17.1 (62.8)	16.9 (62.4)	14.6 (58.3)	11.5 (52.7)	8.0 (46.4)	5.7 (42.3)	10.7 (51.3)
Mean daily minimum °C (°F)	2.0 (35.6)	1.8 (35.2)	3.0 (37.4)	4.5 (40.1)	7.4 (45.3)	10.3 (50.5)	12.2 (54.0)	12.2 (54.0)	10.0 (50.0)	7.6 (45.7)	4.4 (39.9)	2.3 (36.1)	6.5 (43.7)
Record low °C (°F)	−16.1 (3.0)	−12.2 (10.0)	−10.0 (14.0)	−6.4 (20.5)	−4.1 (24.6)	0.0 (32.0)	4.4 (39.9)	2.9 (37.2)	−1.8 (28.8)	−4.8 (23.4)	−8.0 (17.6)	−14.2 (6.4)	−16.1 (3.0)
Average precipitation mm (inches)	70.0 (2.76)	50.9 (2.00)	48.5 (1.91)	51.5 (2.03)	47.2 (1.86)	57.1 (2.25)	50.2 (1.98)	60.7 (2.39)	53.3 (2.10)	80.9 (3.19)	81.9 (3.22)	77.4 (3.05)	729.5 (28.72)
Average precipitation days (≥ 1.0 mm)	12.2	10.4	10.0	10.0	9.2	8.7	8.3	9.8	9.1	12.0	13.2	12.9	125.8
Mean monthly sunshine hours	59.5	79.5	121.6	170.5	202.2	199.8	205.3	185.5	149.2	107.6	71.6	53.5	1,605.7
Source 1: Met Office
Source 2: Starlings Roost Weather

== Governance ==
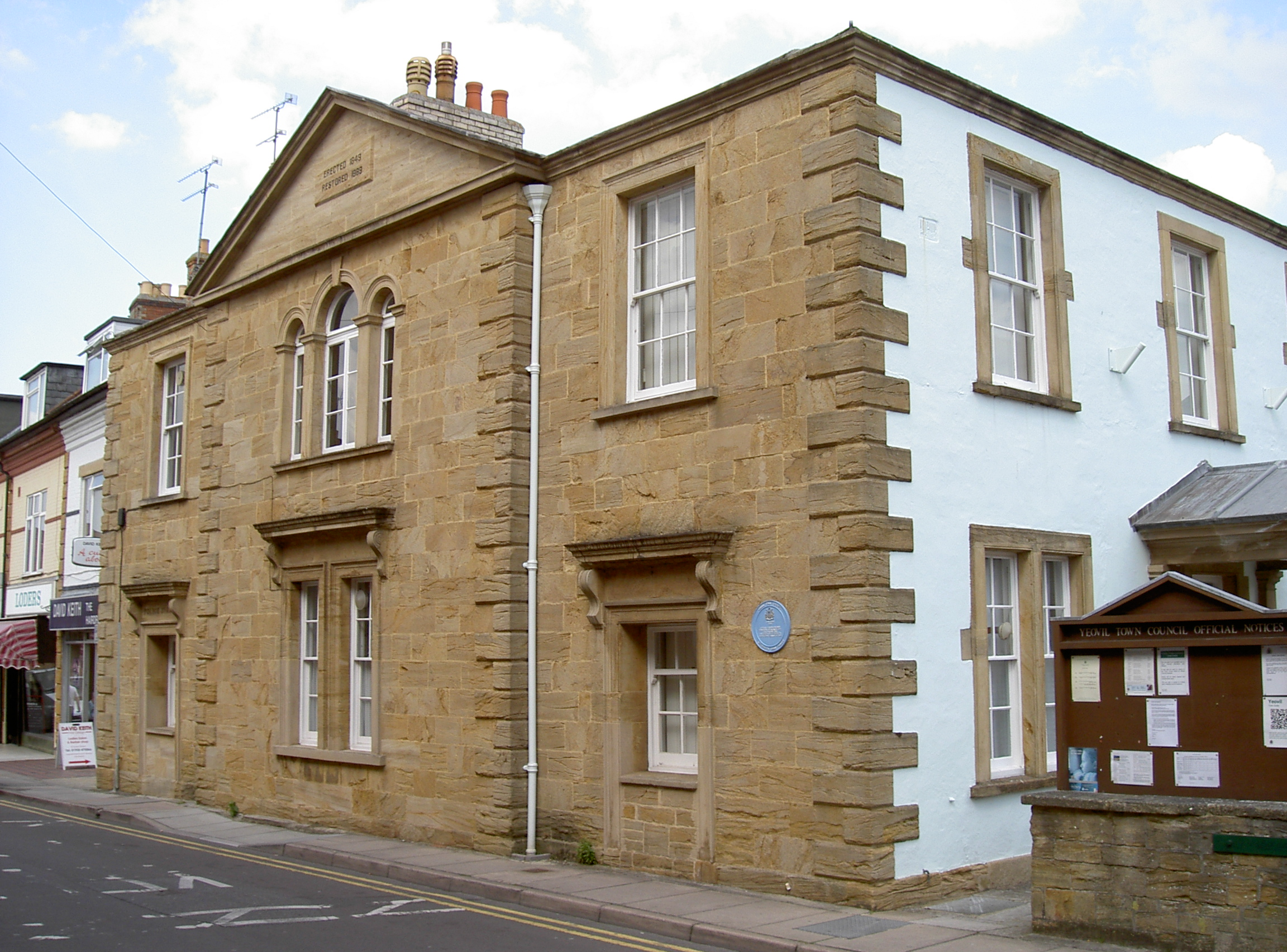
The Town House

There are two tiers of local government covering Yeovil, at parish (town) and unitary authority level: Yeovil Town Council and Somerset Council. The town council is based at the Town House at 19 Union Street. Some suburbs fall within the neighbouring parishes of Yeovil Without, Brympton, and West Coker.

For national elections, the town forms part of the Yeovil constituency.

=== Administrative history ===
Yeovil was an ancient parish in the Stone hundred of Somerset. The town was also an ancient borough. A government survey of boroughs in 1835 found that the borough had clearly been in existence for a very long time, but it had no charters confirming its rights or origins. The borough boundaries covered less than a third of the built-up area as it then was. It was run by a corporation of burgesses, led by a portreeve.

In 1854, the town was converted into a municipal borough, led by a mayor, and the boundaries were enlarged. Under the Local Government Act 1894, civil parishes could no longer straddle borough boundaries, and so the part of the old parish outside the borough became the separate civil parish of Yeovil Without.

The borough of Yeovil was abolished in 1974 under the Local Government Act 1972, with its area becoming part of the new Yeovil district, which covered an extensive surrounding rural area and several other towns as well as Yeovil itself. The Yeovil district was renamed South Somerset in 1985.

No successor parish was created for the former borough at the time of the 1974 reforms, and so it became unparished. A new civil parish of Yeovil covering the area of the pre-1974 borough (subject to some adjustments to the boundaries with neighbouring parishes) was subsequently established in 1982, with its parish council taking the name Yeovil Town Council.

South Somerset was abolished in 2023. Somerset County Council then took over district-level functions across its area, making it a unitary authority, and was renamed Somerset Council.

== Demography ==
At the 2011 census, the population of the built-up area (which extends beyond Yeovil civil parish to include the urban parts of Yeovil Without and Brympton parishes) was 45,784, forming 28% of the population of South Somerset district.

Population since 1801 – Source: A Vision of Britain through Time
Year	1801	1851	1901	1911	1921	1931	1941	1951	1961	1971	1981	1991	2001
Population: South Somerset	70,769	93,075	85,080	84,280	85,001	85,729	92,313	99,407	106,462	114,020	129,310	143,395	150,974

== Economy ==
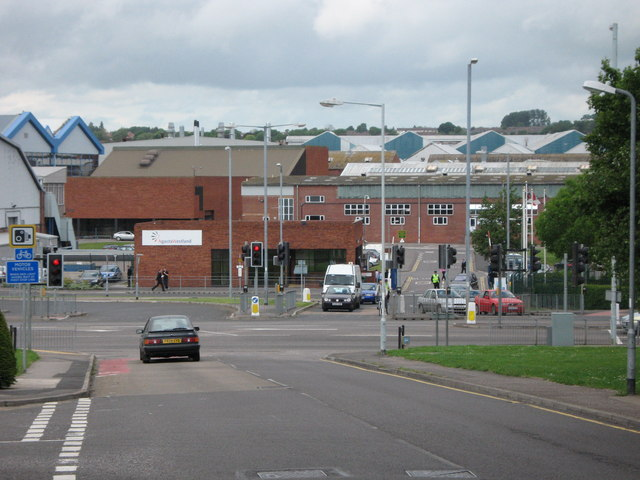
Leonardo Helicopters works

Leonardo manufactures helicopters in Yeovil, and Honeywell Aerospace, formerly Normalair Garratt, builder of aircraft oxygen systems, is also based there.

Yeovil's role as a centre of the aircraft and defence industries continued into the 21st century, despite attempts to diversify and the creation of industrial estates. In January 1986, a proposed sale of Westland Helicopters to the US Sikorsky Aircraft group led to the Westland affair, a crisis in the Thatcher government, the resignation of Michael Heseltine as Secretary of State for Defence, and, two weeks later, the resignation of Secretary of State for Trade and Industry Leon Brittan, who admitted leaking a governmental law officer's letter harshly critical of Heseltine. Leonardo, formerly AgustaWestland, created through the acquisition of Westland by Finmeccanica in 2000, remains the main employer in Yeovil.

Yeovil Aerodrome (ICAO: EGHG), (sometimes known as Yeovil/Westland "Judwin", to avoid confusion with nearby RNAS Yeovilton), is 1 nautical mile (1.9 km) west of the town centre. British defence giant BAE Systems also runs a site producing high-integrity networked software, mainly for the armed forces.

Screwfix, based in Houndstone, started life as Woodscrew Supply Company in 1979. It is now a subsidiary of Kingfisher plc. The company warehouse relocated to Stoke-on-Trent after failing to gain planning permission for expansion.

Quedam Shopping Centre has some 45 shops: the usual high-street chains, several independents, and a multi-storey car park with about 650 spaces.

In 2015, leather manufacturer Pittards bought back its 1964 purpose-built tannery in Sherborne Road, Yeovil. In September 2023, the company went into administration.

== Landmarks ==
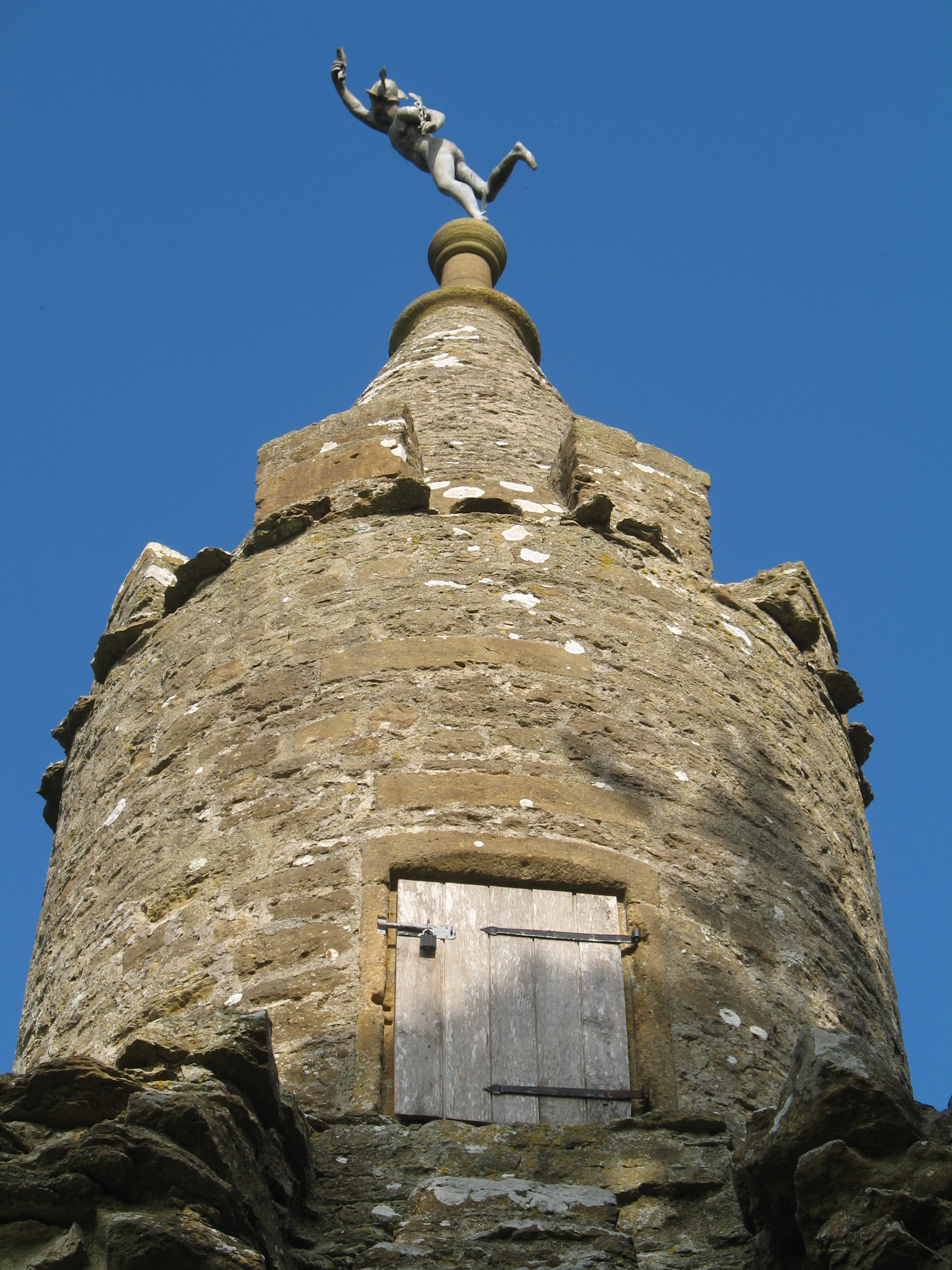
Jack the Treacle Eater, one of the Barwick follies

One symbol of Yeovil is "Jack the Treacle Eater", a folly consisting of a small archway topped by a turret with a statue on top. This stands in the village of Barwick, just to the south of the town. The hamstone Abbey Farm House was built about 1420 by John Stourton II, known as Jenkyn, as was Abbey Barn.

Hendford Manor in the town centre was built about 1720 and has since been converted into offices. It is a Grade II* listed building. Newton Surmaville is a small park and house also known as Newton House, built in 1608–1612 for Robert Harbin, a Yeovil merchant. It is a Grade I listed building.

Yeovil's two theatres are the Octagon, and the Swan, now a ten-screen cinema and 18-lane tenpin bowling alley.

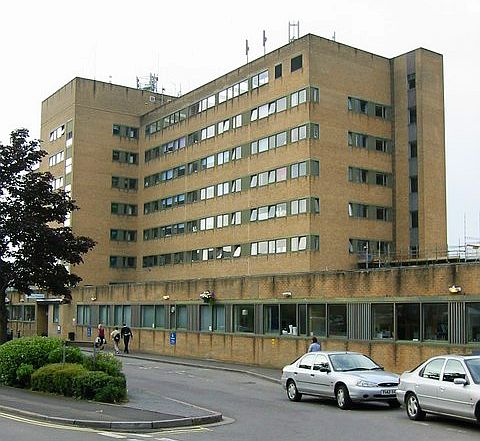
Yeovil hospital

Somerset NHS Foundation Trust, including Yeovil Hospital, provides local health services.

Yeovil Railway Centre is a small museum created in 1993 in response to British Rail's decision to remove the turntable from Yeovil Junction. About 0.25 miles (400 m) of track along the Clifton Maybank spur is used for demonstration trains.

== Transport ==
=== Buses and coaches ===
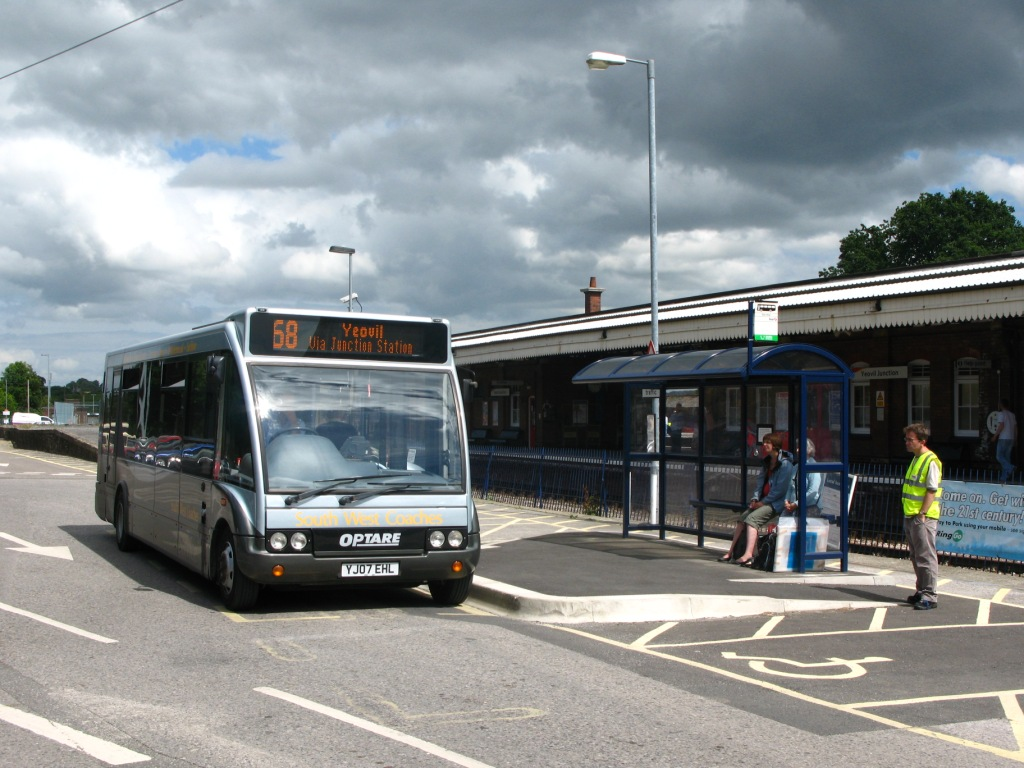
A South West Coaches shuttle service to the town centre calls at Yeovil Junction station

Yeovil's bus services are operated by First West of England, First Hampshire & Dorset, South West Coaches, Stagecoach South West and Damory Coaches; these are centred around the bus station. Routes connect the town centre with both railway stations, Taunton, Blandford Forum, Castle Cary, Chard, Martock and Wells. Coach services are operated by National Express, Berrys Coaches and South West Tours; services connect the town with Taunton and London.

North Dorset Community Accessible Transport (NORDCAT) provides a bookable service to places without other forms of public transport.

=== Railway ===
The town has two railway stations, which are on separate lines:

- Yeovil Pen Mill lies on the Bristol to Weymouth line, with services operated by Great Western Railway. It is located just under 1 mile (1.6 km) to the east of the town centre.
- Yeovil Junction is on the London Waterloo to Exeter line, served by South Western Railway. It is located just over 1.75 miles (2.82 km) to the south of the town centre.

=== Roads ===
The town is on the A30; it was the main route between London and the South West until it was supplanted by the A303 to its north. Junction 25 of the M5 motorway lies around 20 miles (32 km) to the west, near Taunton, giving access to Bristol and the Midlands. Yeovil is also on the mainly single-carriageway A37 north–south road between Bristol and Weymouth.

== Education ==
Further education in Yeovil is mainly provided by Yeovil College, with land-based studies available at a Yeovil centre of Bridgwater College, and some provision through private providers. The town also has a higher education centre, University Centre Yeovil, whose main degree-awarding body is Bournemouth University, with University of the West of England offering some courses.

Secondary education in Yeovil is provided by three schools: Westfield Academy, on Stiby Road; Preston School; and Bucklers Mead Academy.

== Media ==
Local television coverage is provided by BBC West and ITV West Country.

Radio stations are BBC Radio Somerset, Heart West, Greatest Hits Radio South West and Radio Ninesprings.

Local newspapers are the Western Gazette, Somerset Guardian and Standard and SomersetLive.

== Places of worship ==
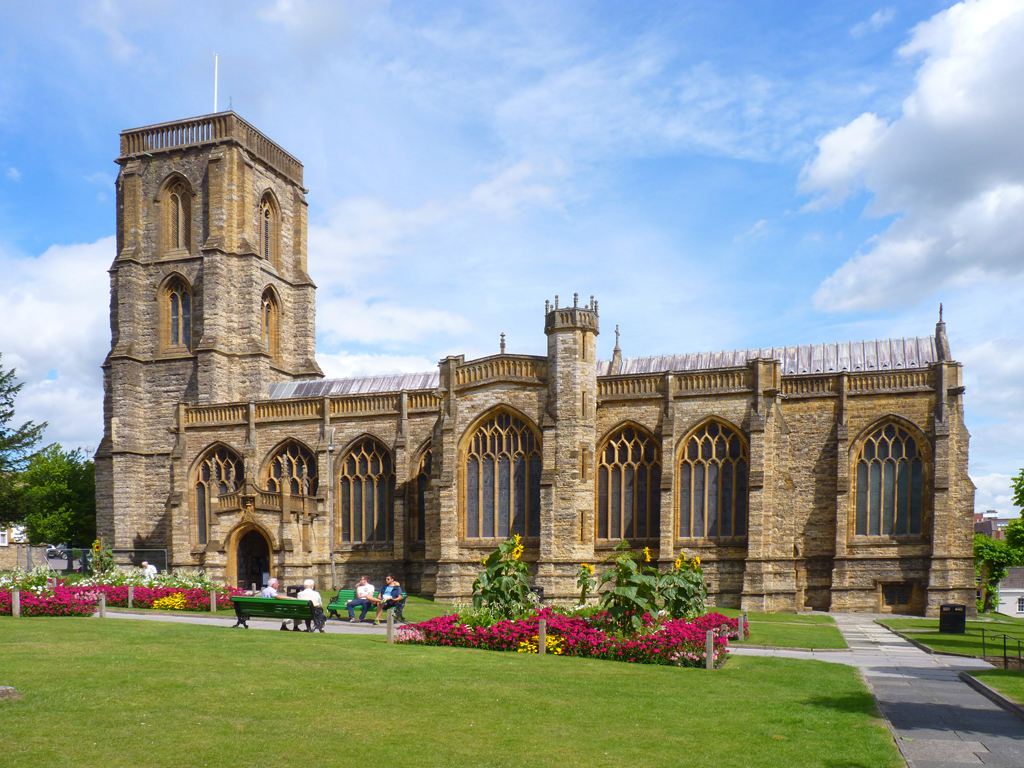
St John's Church

The Anglican Church of St John the Baptist dates from the late 14th century. Its 92 feet (28 m)-high tower is in four stages, with set-back offset corner buttresses. It is capped by openwork balustrading matching the 19th-century parapets. There are two-light late 14th-century windows on all sides at bell-ringing and bell-chamber levels, the latter having fine pierced stonework grilles. There is a stair turret to the north-west corner, with a weather vane termination. The church is a Grade I listed building.

Yeovil has a Roman Catholic Holy Ghost Church, three Methodist churches (Preston Road, St Marks, Chelston Avenue and Vicarage Street), a Baptist church in South Street, the Salvation Army, Elim Pentecostal Church, Yeovil Community Church (Non-denominational Christianity, based at The GateWay), Yeovil Family Church (New Frontiers) and several other Anglican churches.

There is a mosque on Sherborne Road, which was opened to worshippers in May 2017.

== Sport ==
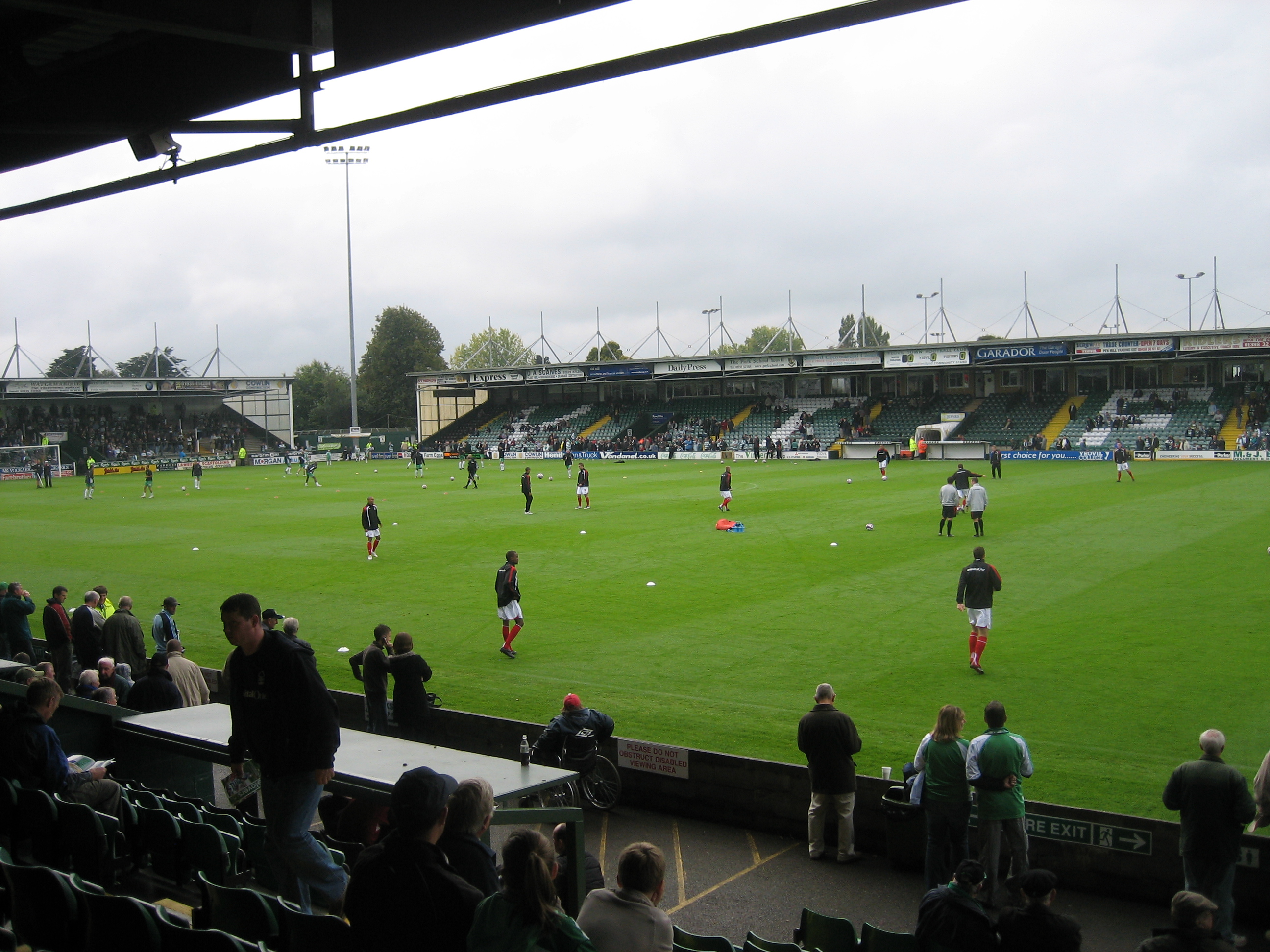
Huish Park

The town's football team, Yeovil Town F.C., plays in green and white livery at Huish Park, and currently competes in the National League. Known as the "Glovers" (referring to the town's glove-making past), it was founded in 1895 and in 2003 won promotion to the English Football League. The club went on become League Two champions in 2005 and League One play-off winners in 2013. However, their stay in tier 2 of English football only lasted for a season and, by 2018, they were relegated to the National League.

In women's football, Yeovil Town L.F.C. was founded in 1990 and won promotion to England's highest tier, the FA Women's Super League, in 2016, before merging with Bridgwater United W.F.C. in 2021. Yeovil Town W.F.C. was reformed in January 2023.

Other football teams in the town include Westland's Sports F.C., which plays at Alvington Lane, and Pen Mill Athletic.

Yeovil Olympiads Athletics Club, founded in 1969, has produced many international athletes. The first was Eric Berry, who came 6th in the 1973 European Juniors in the hammer event. Olympians who started with the club include Max Robertson and Gary Jennings, both 400-metre hurdlers.

Yeovil is home to Ivel Barbarians Rugby Club, formed in 1995 by a merger of the Yeovil and Westlands clubs. South Somerset Warriors formed in 2010 and played in the South West Division of the Rugby League Conference until it folded in 2011.

The Goldenstones Pool and Leisure Centre provides a 25 metres (82 ft) swimming pool, a teaching pool, a gym, sauna, steam room, spectator area and workout studio. Preston Sports Centre has undergone an £800,000 refurbishment, which included adding a gym and dance studio.

In late July 2007, South Somerset District Council plans were made public by the Western Gazette to build a £21-million Yeovil Sports Zone on Yeovil Recreation Ground, which has been a popular open green space with the local community for over 70 years. Residents fought to protect it, leading to rejection of the proposals in 2009, and further consultations in 2010.

The recreation space known as Mudford Rec was frequented by England cricket star Ian Botham during a childhood stay in Yeovil. Another regeneration project would have meant demolishing Foundry House, a former glove factory, but a local campaign led to this becoming a listed building. It will now be converted into a restaurant and offices and new shop and houses built on the surrounding site.

== In popular culture ==
Yeovil is known in Thomas Hardy's Wessex as "Ivell".

It is also one of three main locations in John Cowper Powys's 1929 novel, Wolf Solent.

The Lifemanship Association, a fictional organisation purportedly doing academic research on ways to "win at games and life without actually cheating", was located by author Stephen Potter at 681 Station Road. It was referred to in his several best-selling books on the subject and in the two School for Scoundrels films, based on Potter's works.

Local band The Chesterfields released a single called "Last train to Yeovil" and pop band Bubblegum Splash a song called "18:10 to Yeovil Junction". The folk band Show of Hands wrote a song called "Yeovil Town" about violence and crime they experienced after playing a small gig in Yeovil.

== Notable people ==
Stukely Westcott (1592–1677) was an early American settler and co-founder with Roger Williams (c. 1603–1683), and 11 others, of Providence, Rhode Island (1636), an early American asylum of religious freedom.

Alison Adburgham (1912–1997), social historian and fashion journalist, was born in Yeovil, as were film historian William K. Everson (1929–1996), and traditionalist Catholic writer and public figure Michael T. Davies (1936–2004).

Sportspeople from Yeovil include Luton Town defender Martin Cranie (born 1986), Olympic pentathlete Sam Weale and his twin brother Chris Weale (both born 1982), who is a former professional goalkeeper. Heather Stanning (born 1985), a gold-medallist rower in the 2012 Summer Olympics, was born in Yeovil.

England Women's Rugby World Cup winner 2014 Marlie Packer (born 1989) is from Yeovil and holds the freedom of the town.

The arts are represented by Jim Cregan (born 1946), a guitarist with Steve Harley & Cockney Rebel; singer-songwriter PJ Harvey; John Parish (born 1959), a musician, songwriter and composer, and his younger sister, actress Sarah Parish (born 1968). Flora Twort (1893–1985) was a painter who specialised in watercolours and pastels.

== See also ==
- RNAS Yeovilton (HMS Heron)
