= Yeovil Railway Centre =

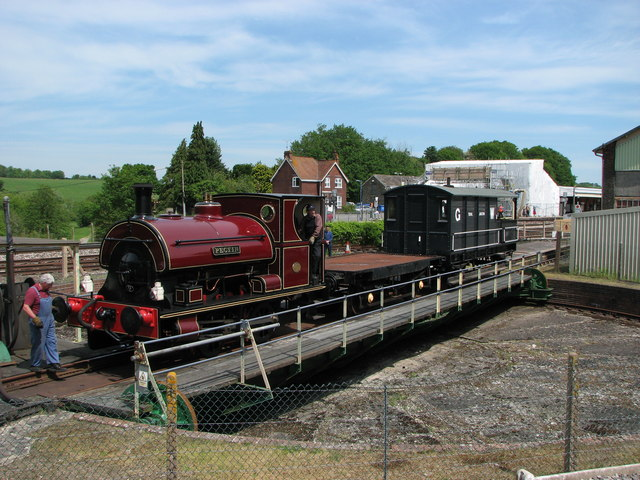
- The turntable at Yeovil Junction station in June 2006
- Established: 1993
- Coordinates: 50°55′27″N 2°36′46″W
- Type: Railway museum
- Website: Official website

The Yeovil Railway Centre is a small railway museum at Yeovil Junction on the L&SWR West of England Main Line between Salisbury and Exeter in the U.K.

It was created in 1993, in response to British Rail's decision to remove the turntable from Yeovil Junction. Approximately 1/4 mile (400 m) of track along the Clifton Maybank spur is used for demonstration trains.

== Description ==
The site contains a G.W.R. transfer shed built in the 1860s, which was erected to facilitate the transfer of goods from 7 ft (2,134 mm) broad gauge to 4 ft 8 1/2 in (1,435 mm) standard gauge freight wagons. This is the last remaining shed of its type on its original site and has been converted to a visitor centre. The site also has an S.R. turntable and a 15,000-imperial-gallon (68,000 L) water tower. These have been restored to working order for the servicing of steam locomotives. An engine shed was built and opened in 1999.

== Events ==
The centre holds regular events including Train Days where steam train rides are operated, using a brake van down the Clifton Maybank spur, and the turntable is demonstrated. Often there are additional attractions on site such as a miniature railway, shed tours, model railway and art gallery. Other events include the Train & Tractor Day and Santa Specials.

Mainline steam excursions to Exeter or Weymouth often call here for the locomotive to be turned and serviced.

== Stock List ==
=== Steam locomotives ===
- Peckett 0-4-0ST Pectin. Built in April 1921. Operational, returned to service December 2021 on a one-off Santa Special day, formally returned to service in March 2022.
- Andrew Barclay 0-4-0ST Lord Fisher. Built in 1915. Boiler Expired in Summer 2022.

=== Diesel Locomotives ===
- British Rail Class 50 50050 Fearless (Privately Owned). Left 2015
- Ruston & Hornsby 0-4-0 Shunting engine
- Fowler 0-4-0DM "Cockney Rebel"
- Fowler 0-4-0DM "Sam"
