= Yeovil Junction railway station =

Railway station in Somerset, England

Yeovil Junction
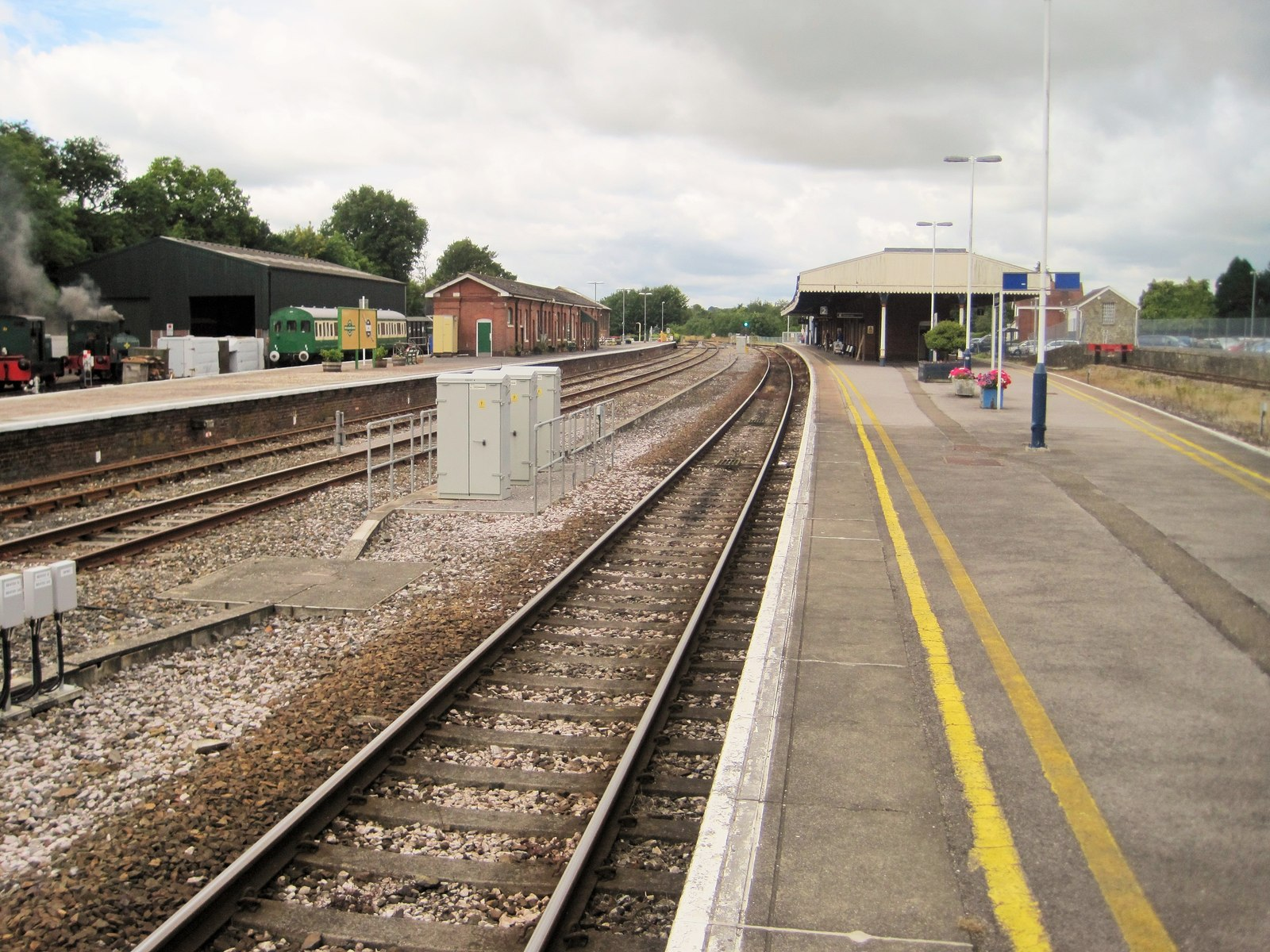
- Looking westwards from the National Rail platforms, with Yeovil Railway Centre on the left

General information
- Location: Yeovil, Somerset, England
- Coordinates: 50.9247°N 2.6132°W
- Grid reference: ST570141
- Manager: South Western Railway
- Platforms: 2

Other information
- Station code: YVJ
- Classification: DfT category D

History
- Original company: Salisbury and Yeovil Railway
- Pre-grouping: London and South Western Railway
- Post-grouping: Southern Railway

Key dates
- 1 June 1860: Yeovil Junction opened
- 13 June 1864: Clifton Maybank opened
- 1908: Station rebuilt
- 7 June 1937: Clifton Maybank closed

Passengers
- 2020/21: ▼36,972
- Interchange: ▼1,106
- 2021/22: ▲0.131 million
- Interchange: ▲3,081
- 2022/23: ▲0.170 million
- Interchange: ▲8,140
- 2023/24: ▲0.191 million
- Interchange: ▲9,611
- 2024/25: ▲0.221 million
- Interchange: ▲20,383
Location
Notes
- Passenger statistics from the Office of Rail and Road

Yeovil Junction is the busier, but less central, of two railway stations serving the town of Yeovil, in Somerset, England; the other is Yeovil Pen Mill. The station is sited 2 miles (3.2 km) outside the town, in the village of Stoford; the station was in Dorset until 1991. It is located 122 miles 48 chains (122.6 mi; 197.3 km) down the line from London Waterloo, and is between Crewkerne to the west, Yeovil Pen Mill to the north, and Sherborne to the east.

It was opened by the London and South Western Railway in 1860, on its London to Exeter line now known as the West of England Main Line. Today, it is managed by South Western Railway, who operate all services at the station, and is also the home of the Yeovil Railway Centre.

== History ==
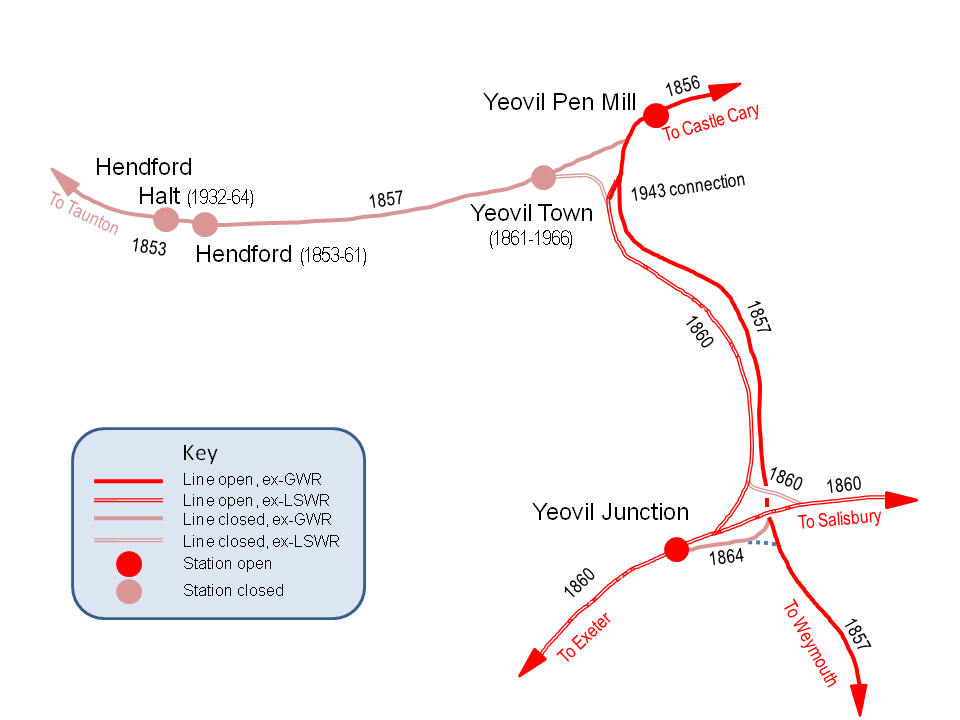
Historical railways around Yeovil

The Salisbury and Yeovil Railway (S&YR) opened the final part of its line from Sherborne on 1 June 1860. Near to Bradford Abbas, it crossed over the Wilts, Somerset and Weymouth line of the Great Western Railway (GWR) on a bridge, then ran alongside it and the Yeovil Branch Line of the Bristol and Exeter Railway (B&ER) to reach that company's terminus at Hendford, on the west side of Yeovil. Just a few weeks later, on 19 July, the London and South Western Railway (LSWR) opened its Yeovil and Exeter line, including its own station at Yeovil Junction, and then continued on towards Exeter Queen Street.

The station was a junction because another line led back to join the S&YR at River Junction, so trains could run from Exeter direct to Hendford (the terminus was moved to a joint B&ER/LSWR Yeovil Town railway station from 1 June 1861). The original eastwards connection from River Junction to Bradford Abbas was closed in 1870, after which most main line trains only called at Yeovil Junction where passengers could change onto a connecting train for the short journey to Yeovil Town. The LSWR operated all trains over the S&YR and bought the smaller company in 1878.

On 13 June 1864, a new line was opened from the GWR up to a goods station at Clifton Maybank adjacent to the LSWR station. The GWR was a 7 ft (2,134 mm) broad gauge line until 1874; broad and standard gauge wagons could be brought alongside each other at Clifton Maybank to allow goods to be transhipped between them.

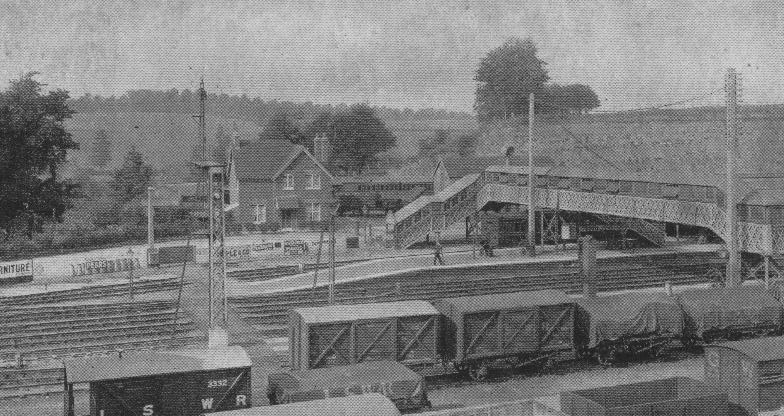
Yeovil Junction following reconstruction, with the station master's house in the background; the wagons are in the Clifton Maybank sidings (1908)

Work started in 1907 to enlarge the station and was completed in 1909. The new northern platform was 590 feet (180 m) long with a track on either side; the northern track was for the Yeovil Town trains and the southern side was for main line services to London. The 510-foot (160 m) southern platform also had two tracks, the northern face for westbound trains and the opposite side was a goods siding. Two through tracks also passed between the platforms for non-stop trains, and a footbridge at the west end connected the two platforms and extended over the branch track to the station forecourt, with a second footbridge erected at the east end of the station (although this was dismantled in 1920 and moved up the line to Overton). The goods yard was also extended in 1908 and new sidings were laid near the GWR exchange siding; the cost of the work was in excess of £47,000.

The GWR's Clifton Maybank branch closed on 7 June 1937. Wagons would be exchanged at Yeovil Town in future, but the GWR had to build a road for Mr Paul, the owner of a private siding which had connected with their line; this was so that he could bring his goods to the Clifton Maybank platform instead, which was still served by the SR.

A new connection was established between the two companies during World War II to allow trains direct access between Yeovil Junction and Pen Mill stations on the Weymouth line. This was opened on 13 October 1943 and offered a new route for trains of war materials, as well as a diversion route in the event of bomb damage.

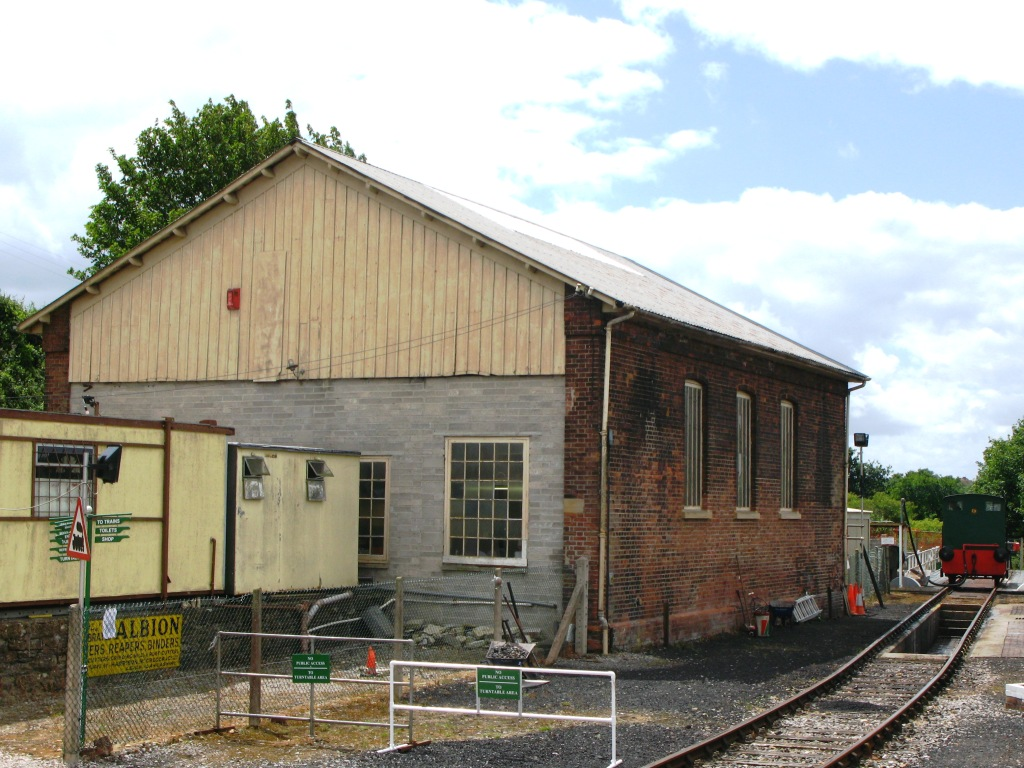
The old goods transfer shed, which is now part of the Yeovil Railway Centre (July 2010)

During the Beeching Axe, Yeovil Town was closed to passengers on 2 October 1966; the branch service then operated to Pen Mill, until it was withdrawn entirely on 4 May 1968. The main line had been rationalised on 11 June 1967; Yeovil was now in the middle of a 15.3 miles (24.6 km) single track section between Sherborne and Chard Junction.

This soon proved a reduction too far and the double track was restored between Sherborne and Yeovil Junction on 1 October 1967, but all trains had to use the eastbound main line platform. On 26 March 1975 the former branch platform was reopened as a through line so that two trains could use the station at the same time.

The turntable has been retained on the south side of the line and is often used for turning the locomotives of steam-hauled excursions. This, and the Clifton Maybank site, has been the home of the Yeovil Railway Centre since either 1993 or 1994.

Preceding station	Historical railways	Following station
Sherborne	London and South Western Railway; London Waterloo to Devon and Cornwall	Sutton Bingham Halt
Yeovil Town	London and South Western Railway; Yeovil Branch	Sutton Bingham Halt

=== Signalling ===
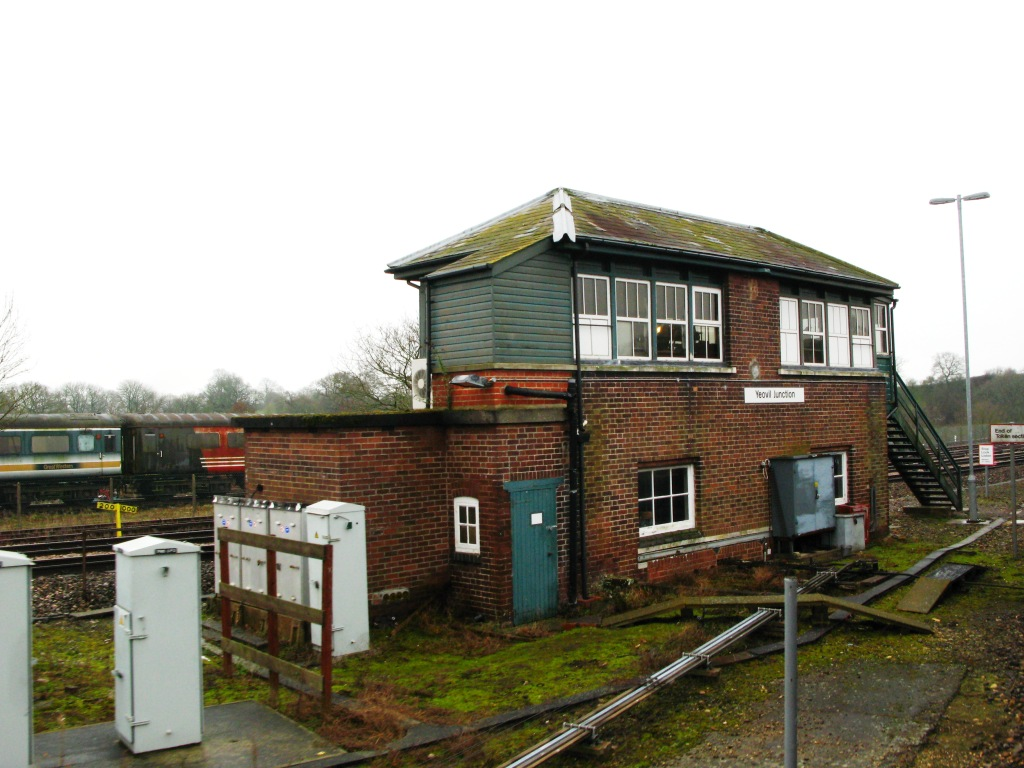
The signal box, which was closed in March 2012 (February 2011)

The first signal boxes were built in 1875. Yeovil Junction no. 1 was on the north side of the line, at the west of the station, with Yeovil Junction no. 2 was at the opposite end. When the station was rebuilt in 1908, the no. 1 box was replaced by the new 60-lever Yeovil Junction East, situated between the main and branch lines; no. 2 box was extended and renamed Yeovil Junction West. The latter was damaged in an accident on 20 August 1918, but was rebuilt. At the end of 1949, they were renamed again, the East Box becoming Yeovil Junction A and the West Box Yeovil Junction B.

The 1967 rationalisation saw the closure of B box on 30 April, but A box was retained to control movements on the branch to Yeovil Town and Pen Mill. A siding connection to the main line was controlled by Yeovil Junction West Ground Frame, while Yeovil Junction East Ground Frame was used for a connection to the sidings on the south side of the main line. When the double track was reinstated to Sherborne, the signal box frame was replaced with a Western Region one of 44 levers.

The remaining box was closed in March 2012, when the line between Salisbury and Exmouth Junction was resignalled. Signalling here is now supervised from the Basingstoke area signalling centre.

=== Accidents and incidents ===
There have been a number of accidents at Yeovil Junction over the years, although most were minor with few injuries:

- 20 September 1860: the rear coach of a Yeovil Junction to Hendford train derailed on the points leading onto the branch
- October 1860: a goods train going towards Hendford collided with a passenger train coming the other way
- 12 June 1886: a collision between a goods train and a passenger train to Yeovil Town, due to confusing signals.
- 13 July 1887: a locomotive collided with the coaches to which it was going to couple, knocking them almost 40 yards (37 m) along the track and injuring nine passengers
- 26 July 1887: an empty passenger carriage derailed while it was being added to a London train
- 4 July 1914: a coupling of an eastbound goods train broke; the rear part collided with the front 200 yards (180 m) from Yeovil Junction, knocking the wooden upper storey off the West signal box
- 20 August 1918: a collision between locomotives occurred, due to the signalman not following rules.

== Location ==
The entrance to the station is across the footbridge from the car park, on the north side of the line. The garage in the middle of the car park is the station's original goods shed, and the remaining goods sidings are at the end of the car park. Descending from the footbridge to the platform brings passengers to the main station offices, which are built from red bricks with red glazed abutments. A second similar building at the east end of the platform is the station buffet which still contains its original 1908 counter. Now known as Peppers, it appeared in a list of highly commended station cafes published in 2009; it came under new management in 2011.

== Facilities ==
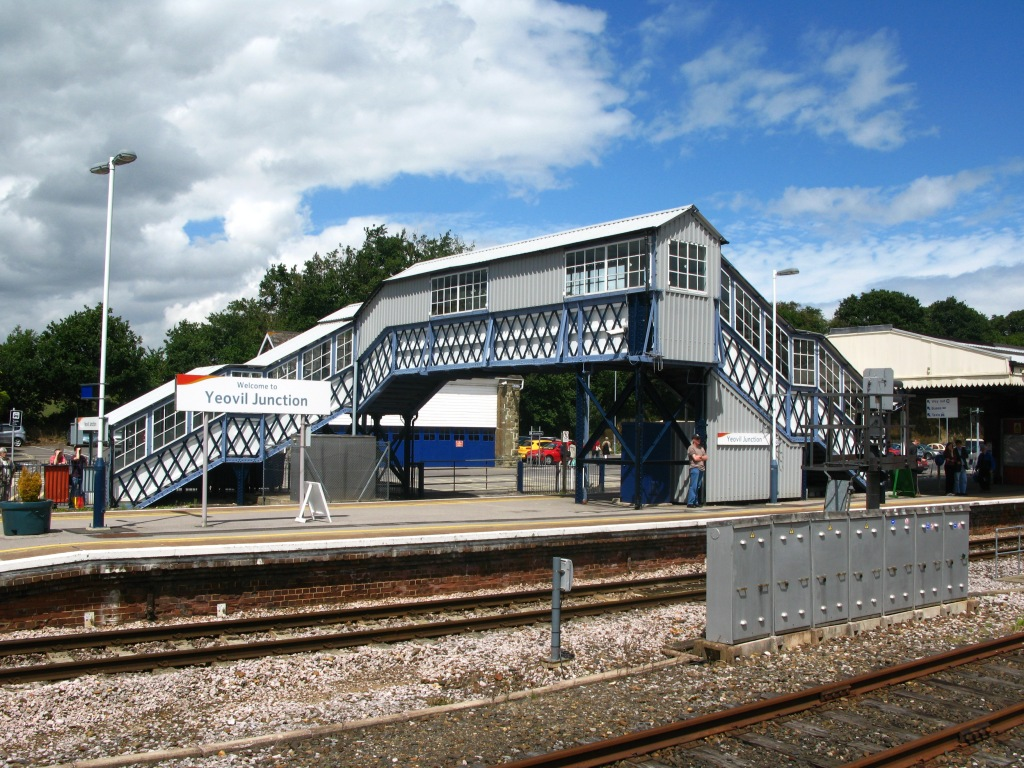
The footbridge to the station in 2010

The station, in common with most other stations on the West of England Main Line, has a ticket office and a ticket machine, a car park and bike storage, toilets, a waiting room and help points. As the footbridge leading to the island platform does not have lifts, the station does not have step-free access.

== Platform layout ==
Tracks serve both sides of the platform and are each signalled for trains to run in either direction.

Opposite the main platform the old eastbound through line has been lifted, but the westbound line is retained as a siding, accessible only from the east end of the station. Beyond is the old westbound platform, which is no longer connected to the main station but is used by occasional visiting steam trains and by the Yeovil Railway Centre, which lies to the south. The turntable is at the right of their railway centre. It makes use of tracks to the left, which are on the site of the old GWR Clifton Maybank goods depot. At the far end is a raised earthwork that looks like it once carried another siding, but it is in fact part of the original scheme of 1864 which envisaged another link from Clifton Maybank southwards towards Weymouth, which was never completed.

== Passenger volume ==
Passenger volume at Yeovil Junction
	2004–05	2005–06	2006–07	2007–08	2008–09	2009–10	2010–11	2011–12	2012–13	2013–14	2014–15	2015–16	2016–17	2017–18	2018–19	2019–20	2020–21	2021–22	2022–23	2023–24	2024–25
Entries and exits	174,456	192,645	194,798	209,290	215,688	210,786	206,802	206,174	197,750	212,150	214,748	222,396	238,490	223,710	210,246	189,228	36,972	130,876	170,474	190,552	221,442
Interchanges	0	0	0	0	0	0	1,325	2,543	2,845	3,558	3,686	6,997	11,603	6,070	7,896	4,664	1,106	3,081	8,140	9,611	20,383

The statistics cover twelve month periods that start in April.

== Services ==
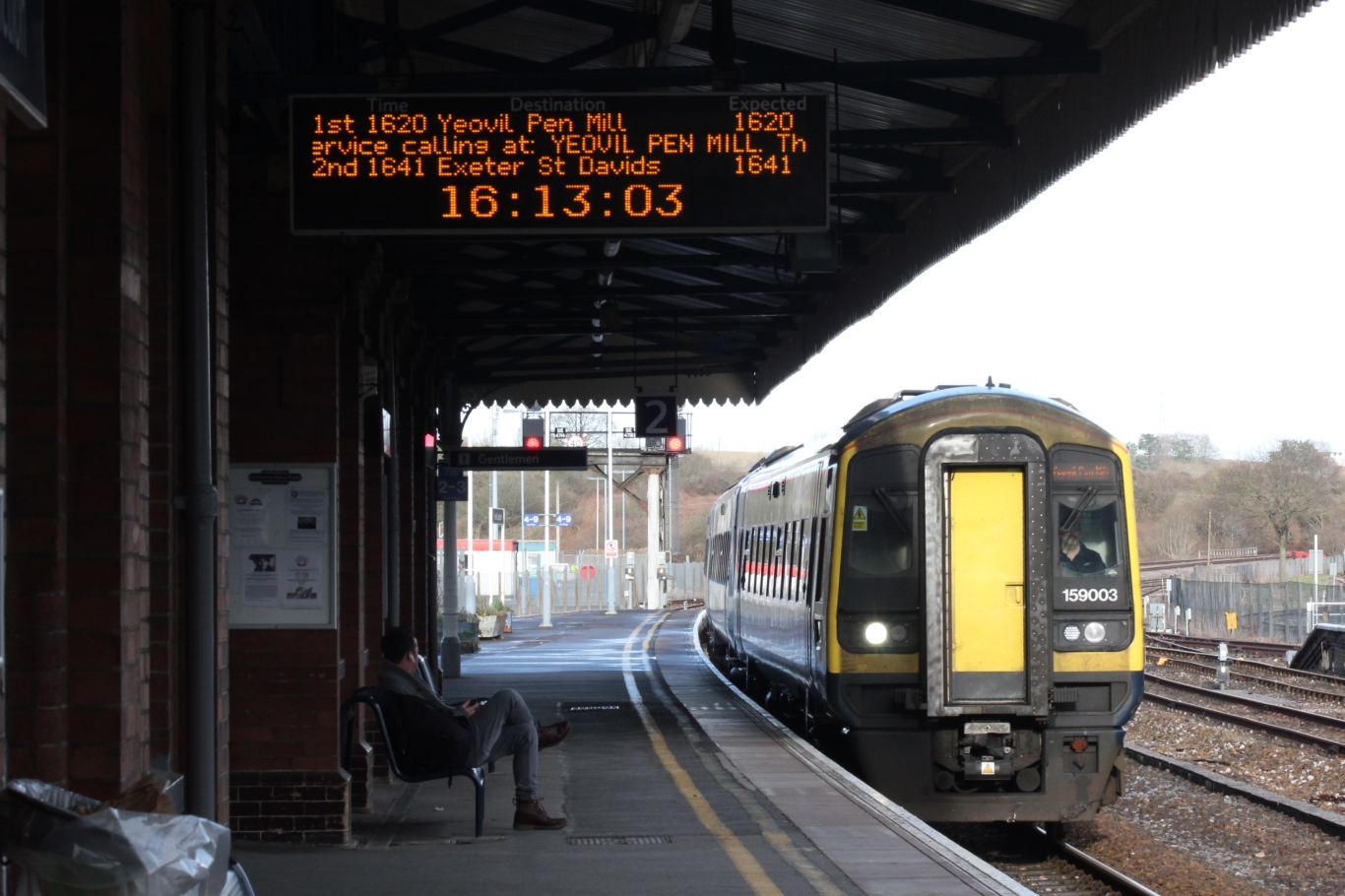
An SWR Class 159 diesel multiple unit, with a service from Waterloo to Pen Mill in March 2019

South Western Railway operates the following off-peak service pattern, in trains per hour/day (tph/tpd):

- 1 tph to London Waterloo
- 1 tph to Exeter St Davids
- 2 tpd to Yeovil Pen Mill.

Somerset Council operates the circular bus route 68 from the station to Yeovil bus station, Yeovil Pen Mill and the nearby village of Barwick.

Preceding station	National Rail	Following station
Sherborne	South Western Railway; West of England Main Line	Crewkerne
Sherborne	South Western Railway; Heart of Wessex Line	Yeovil Pen Mill

== Community rail ==
The station, as with others between Crewkerne and Tisbury, is part of the Blackmore Vale Community Rail Partnership.

== See also ==
- Southern Railway routes west of Salisbury

== Bibliography ==
- Quick, Michael (2023). Railway Passenger Stations in Great Britain: A Chronology (PDF) (5th ed.). London: Railway and Canal Historical Society.
