= Yeovil Town railway station =

Former railway station in Somerset, England

Coordinates: 50°56′25.7″N 2°37′30.3″W

Yeovil Town
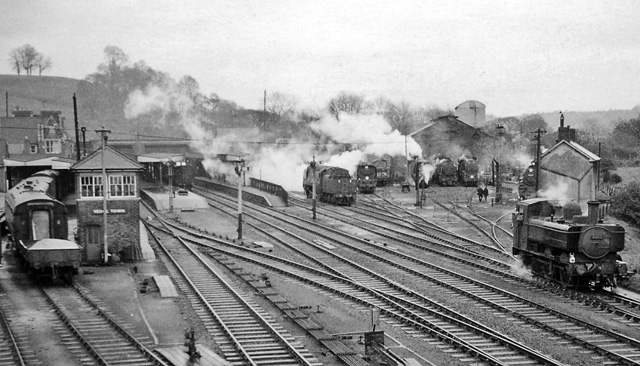
- Yeovil Town in 1964

General information
- Location: Yeovil, Somerset; England
- Platforms: 4

Other information
- Status: Disused

History
- Original company: Bristol and Exeter Railway
- Pre-grouping: GWR/LSWR Joint
- Post-grouping: Great Western Railway

Key dates
- 1 June 1861: Station opens
- 3 October 1966: Closed for passenger traffic
- 3 March 1967: Station completely closed
Location

Yeovil Town was a railway station that served the town of Yeovil in Somerset, England.

== History ==
The station was a stop on the Yeovil to Taunton Line and also had shuttle services to Pen Mill and Yeovil Junction stations. The station opened on 1 June 1861, replacing an earlier Yeovil Hendford railway station when the line was extended. It closed to passenger traffic on 3 October 1966, but freight and parcels traffic continued to use the station until 3 March 1967, when these services were also withdrawn.

Preceding station	Disused railways	Following station
Hendford Halt	Great Western Railway; Yeovil to Taunton Line	Yeovil Junction or Yeovil Pen Mill; Shuttle Service

== The site today ==
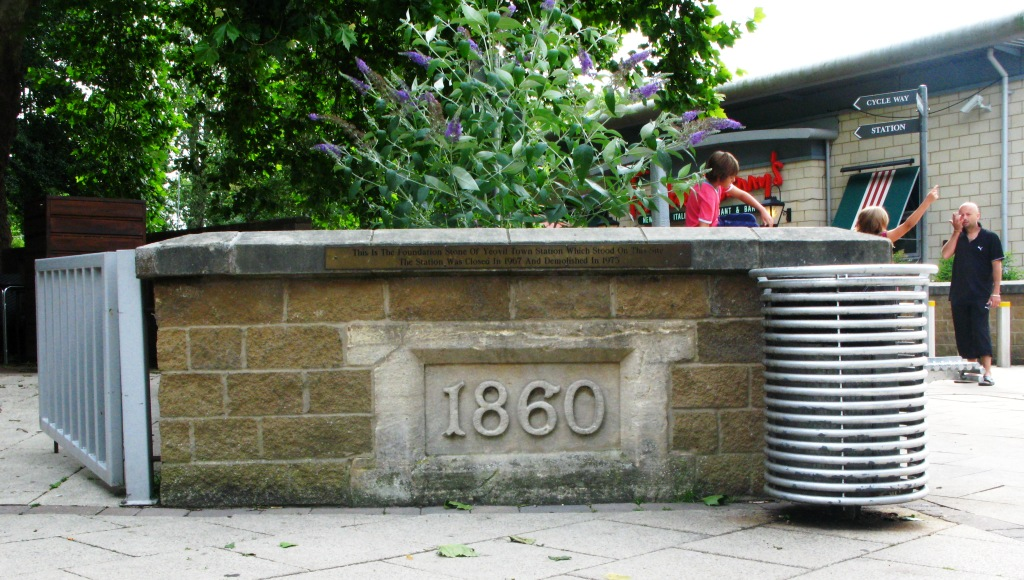
This date stone is all that remains of Yeovil's most central railway station

After closure, the station was demolished in 1973 and the site was cleared to serve as a car and coach park. A cinema and leisure complex has also been built on part of the site.
