= Yeovil Pen Mill railway station =

Railway station in Somerset, England

Yeovil Pen Mill
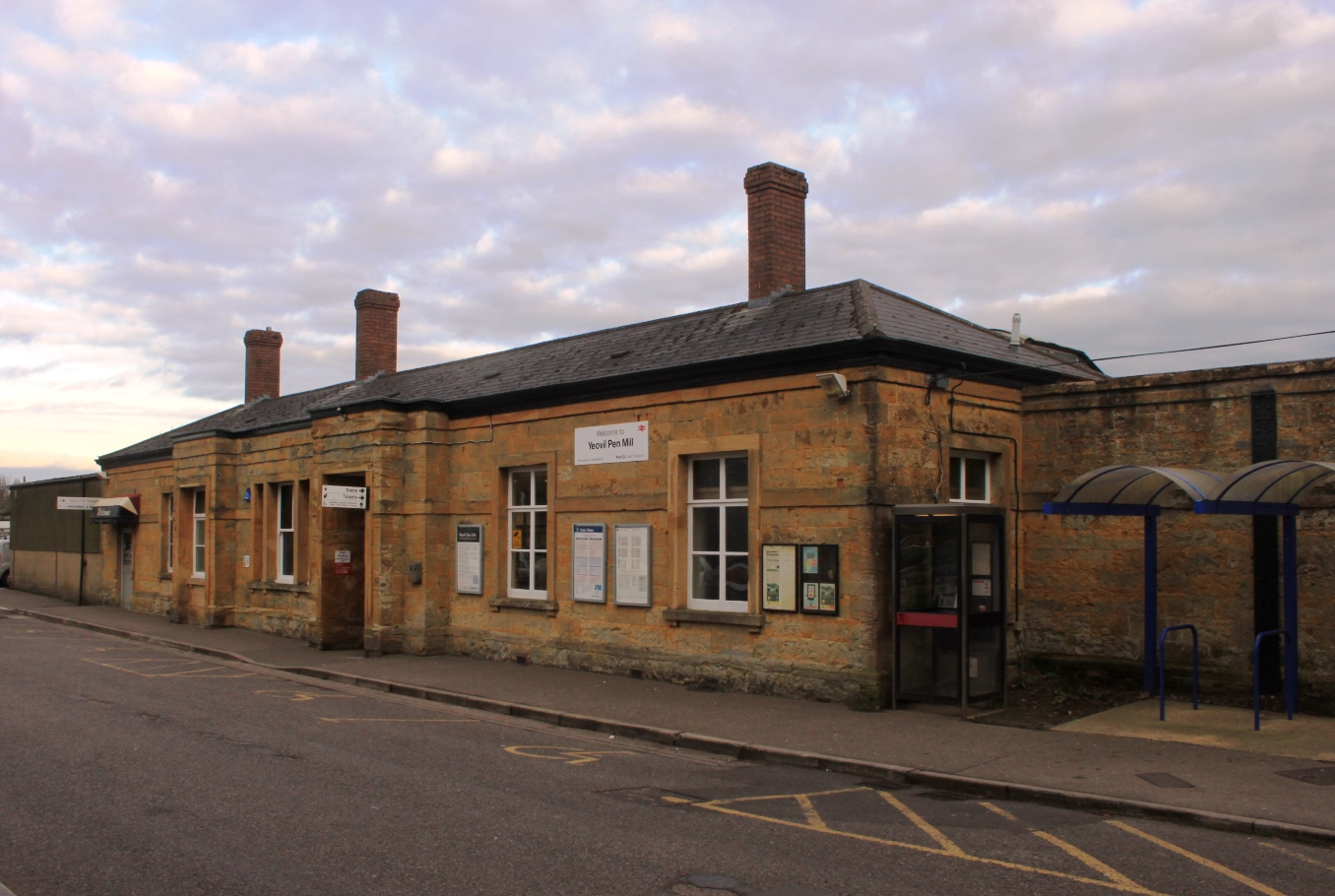

General information
- Location: Yeovil, Somerset, England
- Coordinates: 50.945°N 2.613°W
- Grid reference: ST570163
- Manager: Great Western Railway
- Platforms: 2

Other information
- Station code: YVP
- Classification: DfT category E

History
- Original company: Great Western Railway

Key dates
- 1 September 1856: Opened

Passengers
- 2020/21: ▼37,770
- Interchange: ▼915
- 2021/22: ▲0.121 million
- Interchange: ▲2,321
- 2022/23: ▲0.147 million
- Interchange: ▲12,400
- 2023/24: ▲0.166 million
- Interchange: ▲16,090
- 2024/25: ▲0.170 million
- Interchange: ▲21,348
Location
Notes
- Passenger statistics from the Office of Rail and Road

Yeovil Pen Mill railway station is one of two railway stations that serve the town of Yeovil in Somerset, England. It is situated about a mile to the east of the town centre. The station has an unusual arrangement with its two platforms separated by a single track. It is at milepost 141 1/4 (227.3 km) from London Paddington.

It was opened with the line from London to Weymouth in 1856 but was also the junction for a branch to Taunton until that closed in 1963. Services today are provided by Great Western Railway on the Heart of Wessex Line from Bristol Temple Meads to Weymouth, and also by South Western Railway trains between London Waterloo and Yeovil Junction.

A collision at the station in 1913 resulted in three deaths.

== History ==
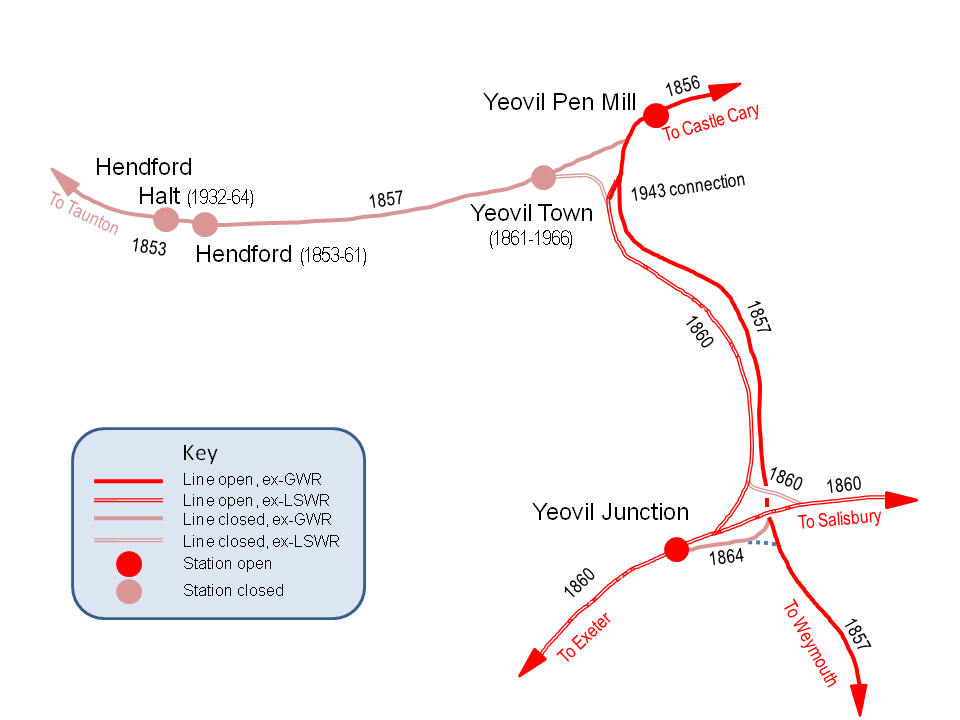
Railways in Yeovil, Pen Mill at top right

The first railway in Yeovil was a Bristol and Exeter Railway (B&ER) branch from near Taunton which opened to a terminus at Hendford on the west side of the town on 1 October 1853. The Great Western Railway (GWR) had been slowly building its Wilts, Somerset and Weymouth Railway and this reached Pen Mill on the east side of the town on 1 September 1856. It was a temporary terminus for the line until it was completed through to Weymouth on 20 January 1857.

The contractors for the GWR line had used a temporary track to Hendford to bring materials to Pen Mill. The B&ER now brought this up to passenger standard and extended their trains to Pen Mill from 2 February 1857.

A competing line opened on 1 June 1860. The Salisbury and Yeovil Railway was operated by, and later became part of, the London and South Western Railway (LSWR). It terminated at the B&ER's Hendford station for a year but a new joint station for the B&ER and LSWR named Yeovil Town opened in a much convenient site one year later on 1 June 1861.

Preceding station	Historical railways	Following station
Marston Magna	Great Western Railway (Wilts, Somerset and Weymouth Railway)	Yetminster
Terminus	Bristol and Exeter Railway (Yeovil branch)	Yeovil Town

The station had two platforms with four tracks between them The platforms and the track next to them were covered by a train shed. The goods shed was at the north end of the station on the west side of the line but there were other sidings behind the platform on the east side. A fire broke out on 18 April 1859 which badly damaged the building on the east side. It was made safe but it was decided to use the west platform for all trains, the platform being extended beyond the train shed at both ends so that it was sufficiently long for two trains to use it at the same time, although this involved some awkward shunting for them to pass each other.

Both railways at Pen Mill were built to the GWR's broad gauge but the BER added a third rail to allow standard gauge trains to operate on their line from November 1868. The GWR converted their line to standard gauge in June 1974 and broad gauge trains were withdrawn from the BER line (which had been owned by the GWR since 1 January 1876) in June 1879, after which all trains at Yeovil were on the standard gauge. The GWR then set about upgrading the Weymouth line with a second track. A second platform was built at Yeovil but in an unusual position with just the northbound line between the new platform and the original platform. The southbound line served the opposite side of the new platform. This enabled part of the new platform and the footbridge to be covered by the train shed, although it was extended across the platform with the usual type of canopy.

The station saw further alterations in 1934. The platforms were again extended and the train shed was removed. New canopies erected to replace it and the footbridge, which was now exposed, was given a roof. A connection between the GWR line and the Southern Railway station at Yeovil Junction during World War II to allow trains direct access between the Weymouth line and the Southern's West of England Line. This was opened on 13 October 1943 and offered a new route for trains of war materials, as well as a diversion route in the event of bomb damage.

The Taunton branch was closed in 1963, the last trains running on Saturday 13 June, but the line at the Yeovil end remained open for goods traffic to Hendford and passenger services from both Pen Mill and Yeovil Junction to Yeovil Town but the service between Pen Mill and Yeovil Town was withdrawn on 28 November 1965. Yeovil Town remained open until 20 October 1966 when the service from Yeovil Junction was diverted to Pen Mill, the first time that regular passenger trains had been scheduled over the 1943 connection. The service was short lived, being withdrawn after 4 May 1968.

The station was refurbished in 1993 with the official 'reopening' being made by Paddy Ashdown, the local Member of Parliament, on 3 December. The ticket office was rebuilt with a waiting room and new toilets to replace the earlier ones on the platform.

Regular trains returned to the Yeovil Junction line in December 2015 when South West Trains started to operate a few of their services to and from London Waterloo to Pen Mill. In the summer of 2016 they ran a few services between Yeovil Junction and Weymouth via Pen Mill.

== Description ==
Pen Mill is 141 miles 22 chains (227.4 km) from London Paddington via Chippenham. This is 11 mi 57 ch (18.8 km) from Castle Cary, 27 mi 37 ch (44.2 km) from Weymouth, and 1 mi 67 ch (3.0 km) from Yeovil Junction.

The single-storey station building, made from local Ham stone, is on the west side of the line on the platform which is usually served by trains towards Castle Cary and Bristol Temple Meads. It is also used by trains to and from Yeovil Junction. There is just a single track between this and the platform used by trains towards Dorchester West and Weymouth. There is a footbridge between the two platforms but no lift. The signal box is at the north end of the southbound platform.

There is a ticket office and toilets along with car and bicycle parking.

== Passenger volume ==
There has consistently been more than 100,000 entries and exits recorded at the station every year since 2008. Before the COVID-19 pandemic of 2020 they had increased to about 140,000 but during this period they dropped to fewer than 40,000. They were exceeding pre-COVID levels by 2022 and in 2024–25 they were just short of 170,000.

Passengers by year
Year (Note: The passenger data covers twelve month periods that start in April.)	Entries and exits	Interchanges
2004–2005	98,536	0
2005–2006	99,041	0
2006–2007	102,643	0
2007–2008	104,700	0
2008–2009	110,546	0
2009–2010	115,882	0
2010–2011	126,786	916
2011–2012	132,358	2,035
2012–2013	129,252	2,150
2013–2014	133,264	4,016
2014–2015	136,644	3,240
2015–2016	130,020	7,318 (Note: Regular services between Pen Mill and Yeovil Junction started in December 2015.)
2016–2017	141,014	12,669
2017–2018	136,832	5,738
2018–2019	139,732	6,918
2019–2020	143,732	5,245
2020–2021	37,770	915
2021–2022	120,742	2,321
2022–2023	147,106	12,400
2023–2024	166,136	16,090
2024–2025	169,742	21,348

== Services ==
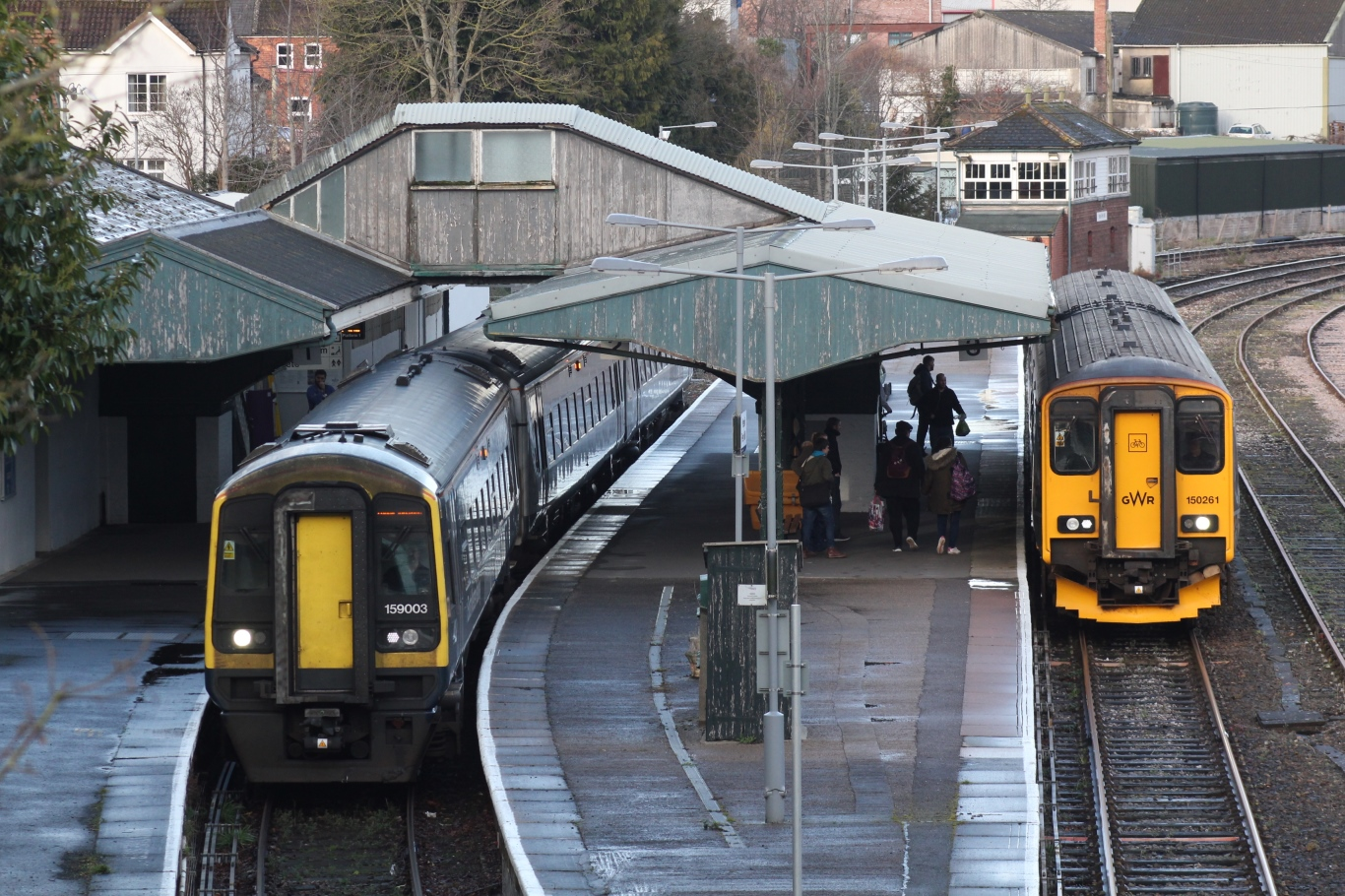
A South Western Railway Class 159 (left) and Great Western Railway Class 150 (right)

Great Western Railway operates the majority of services at Pen Mill, on their route between Weymouth and Gloucester, via Bristol Temple Meads.

South Western Railway operates a few services between London Waterloo and Pen Mill, some via Yeovil Junction and others via Westbury.

Preceding station	National Rail	Following station
Castle Cary	Great Western Railway (Heart of Wessex Line)	Thornford
Castle Cary	South Western Railway (London Waterloo – Yeovil Junction)	Yeovil Junction

== Signalling ==
The signal box that was built in 1937

The first signal boxes at Pen Mill were opened in May 1877. The Yeovil Pen Mill Number 1 box (later renamed Yeovil Pen Mill North) was built just north of the goods shed. It had a 24 lever frame of which 17 were in use when it opened. The Yeovil Pen Mill Number 2 box (later renamed Yeovil Pen Mill South) was in the junction between the Weymouth and Taunton lines. This had a 21 lever frame and 18 were in use.

The station was resignalled in February 1937. The two signal boxes were closed and a single new one opened at the north end of the southbound platform which is equipped with 65 levers. The connection to the Yeovil Junction line that was opened in 1943 required a new signal box. This was designated Yeovil South Junction and was equipped with 33 levers and built on the west side of the line by the junction. It closed on 26 May 1968.

== Engine shed ==
The GWR had opened a locomotive depot on B&ER land south of the station in September 1856. After the line was completed to Weymouth the depot was handed over to the B&ER. It had a turntable and a 105-foot (32 m) timber shed that covered two tracks. It was widened in 1877 to cover a third track. It was closed in January 1959 when the locomotives and crews were transferred to the shed at Yeovil Town.

There were 14 locomotives based at Pen Mill in 1909 but by 1959 this had reduced to just 8. From the 1930s they were usually 0-6-0PTs with a couple of 2-6-2Ts for services on the Taunton branch. The smaller locomotives shunted the various yards around Yeovil, worked a some goods trains on the Weymouth line, and helped heavy trains up the climbs to Evershot and Castle Cary.

== 1913 accident ==
There was a fatal accident at Pen Mill on 8 August 1913 when an excursion train from London Paddington to Weymouth was stopped in the southbound platform. It was shunting to remove some vehicles when a timetabled service from Paddington to Weymouth hauled by GWR 3700 Class number 3710 City of Bath passed a danger signal and hit the rear of the excursion. Two people were killed in the excursion train and ten injured but one of those later died.

== Community rail ==
The station, along with others on the Heart of Wessex Line, is part of the South Wessex Community Rail Partnership.
