= School for Scoundrels =

School for Scoundrels may refer to:

- School for Scoundrels (1960 film), a British comedy film starring Ian Carmichael, Terry-Thomas and Alistair Sim
- School for Scoundrels (2006 film), an American film based on the above, featuring Billy Bob Thornton and Jon Heder
