= Whimple railway station =

Railway station in Devon, England

Whimple
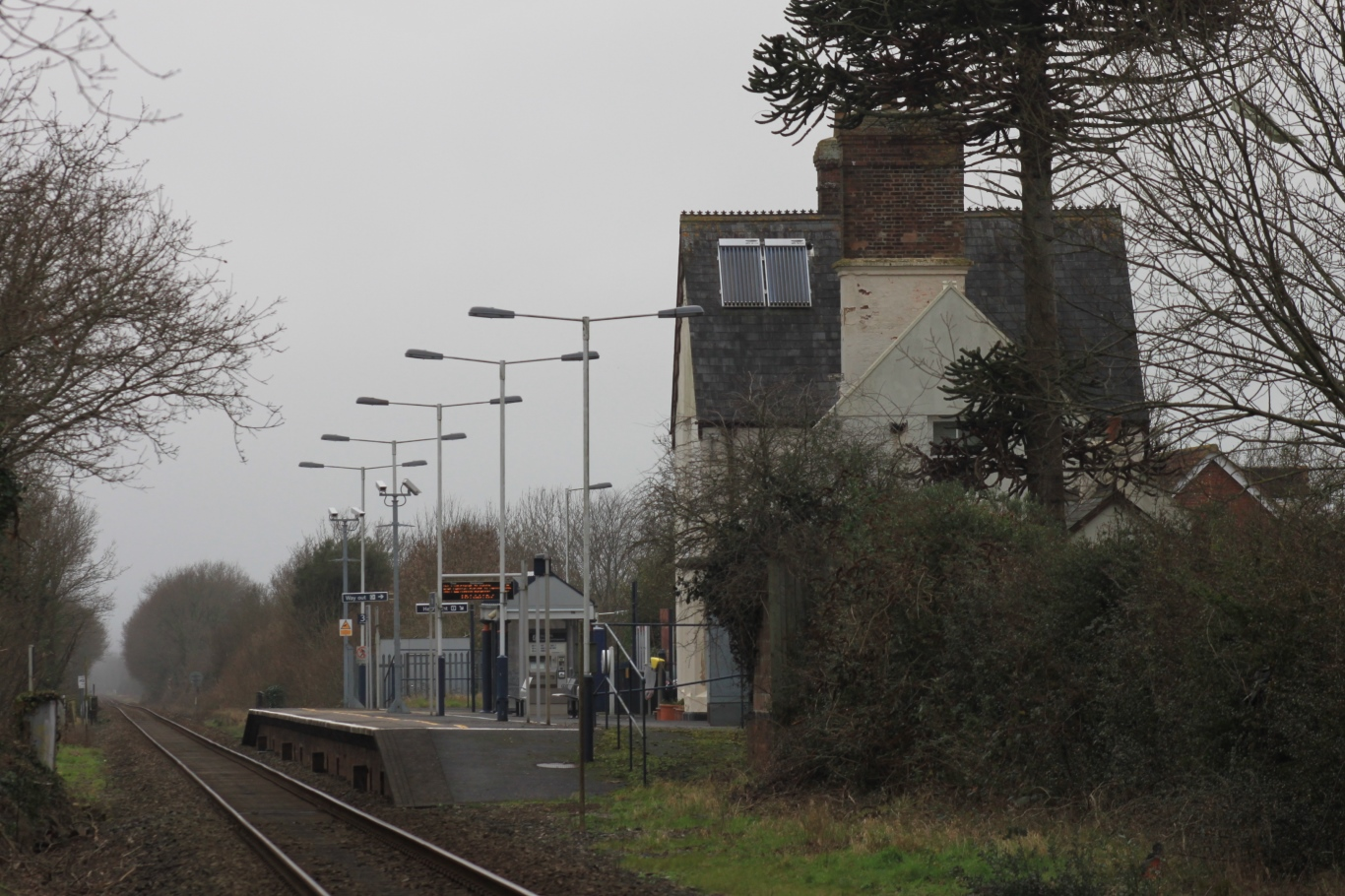
- Seen from the east in 2016

General information
- Location: Whimple, East Devon; England
- Coordinates: 50.768°N 3.354°W
- Grid reference: SY045973
- Manager: South Western Railway
- Platforms: 1

Other information
- Station code: WHM
- Classification: DfT category F2

History
- Original company: London and South Western Railway
- Post-grouping: Southern Railway

Key dates
- 1860: Opened

Passengers
- 2021/22: ▲36,474
- 2022/23: ▲39,808
- 2023/24: ▲53,064
- 2024/25: ▼51,140
- 2025/26: ▼48,872
Location
Notes
- Passenger statistics from the Office of Rail and Road

Whimple railway station serves the village of Whimple in east Devon, England. It is operated by South Western Railway which provides services on the West of England Main Line. It is 163 miles 2 chains (262.4 km) down the line from London Waterloo, and is sited between Cranbrook and Feniton.

== History ==
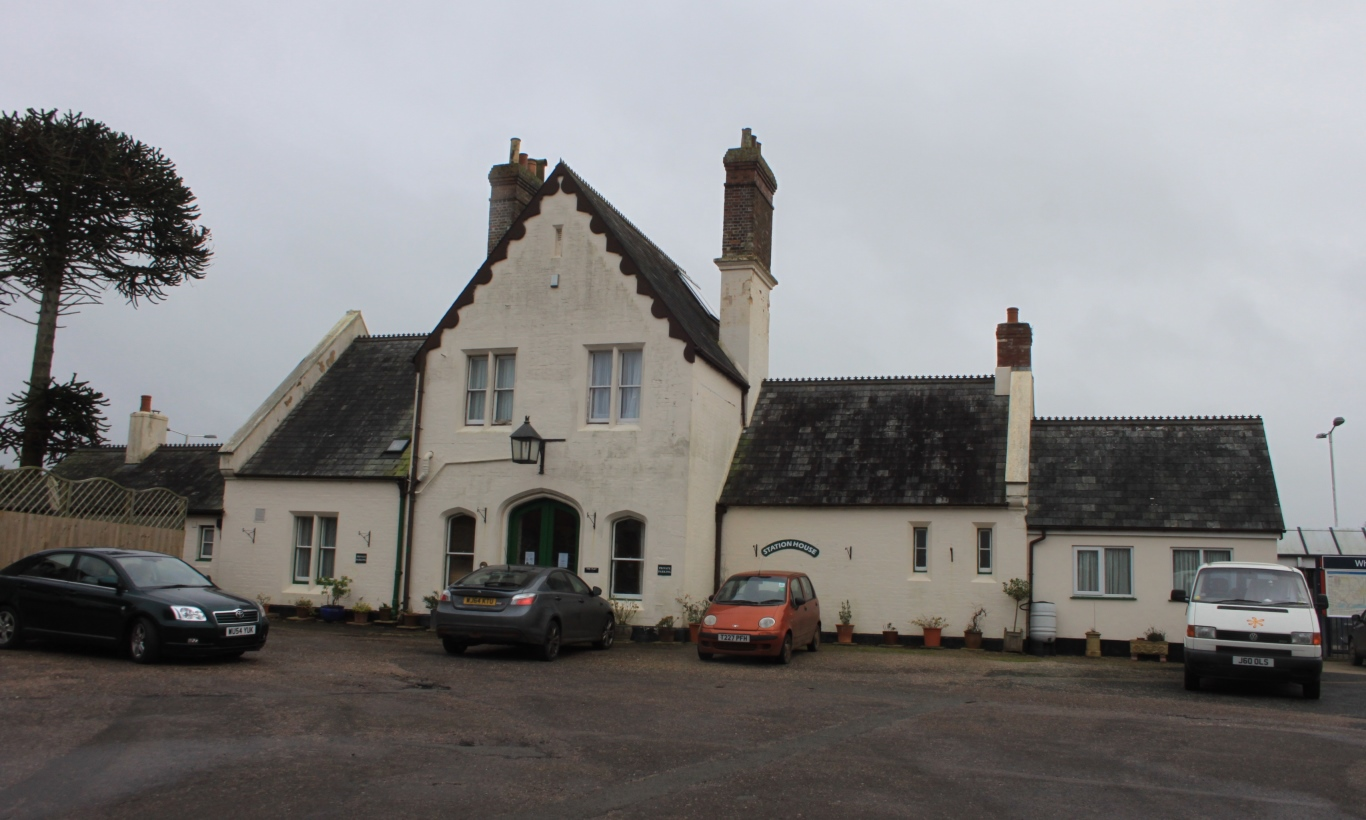
The old station building

The station was opened by the LSWR on 19 July 1860, along with its Exeter Extension from Yeovil Junction to Exeter Queen Street. The station was situated to the east of the village and designed by the architect Sir William Tite. The main building was situated on the up platform and was two-storeys high to provide the station master with accommodation. The goods shed was nearby at the east end of the station, and a signal box was built opposite on the other platform in 1875. In 1892 Henry Whiteway established a cider factory on the north side of the station. This generated much of the goods traffic at the station; in the 1930s it was estimated that the factory was responsible for 30,000 tons of traffic each year.

On 11 June 1967 all passenger trains were diverted to the down platform. The track through the northern platform was retained to serve Whiteway’s factory, but the signal box was closed and the train crew operated the points. Public goods traffic was withdrawn on 4 December 1967 but Whiteways continued to handle rail traffic. The station became unstaffed on 5 October 1970.

In 1992, the original London bound platform was extended across the disused formation of the London bound track to meet the running line and was brought back into use. The other platform and the footbridge were then demolished.

Preceding station	Historical railways	Following station
Sidmouth Junction	London and South Western Railway; Salisbury to Exeter	Broad Clyst

== Facilities ==
The single platform has a simple metal and glass waiting shelter, as well as a ticket machine, a help point and bike racks.

== Passenger volume ==
Passenger volume at Whimple
	2004–05	2005–06	2006–07	2007–08	2008–09	2009–10	2010–11	2011–12	2012–13	2013–14	2014–15	2015–16	2016–17	2017–18	2018–19	2019–20	2020–21	2021–22	2022–23	2023–24	2024–25
Entries and exits	34,779	40,516	46,958	53,697	56,286	59,354	60,540	68,392	65,942	68,482	68,896	68,448	61,854	59,538	55,532	49,766	13,136	36,474	39,808	53,064	51,140

The statistics cover twelve month periods that start in April.

== Services ==
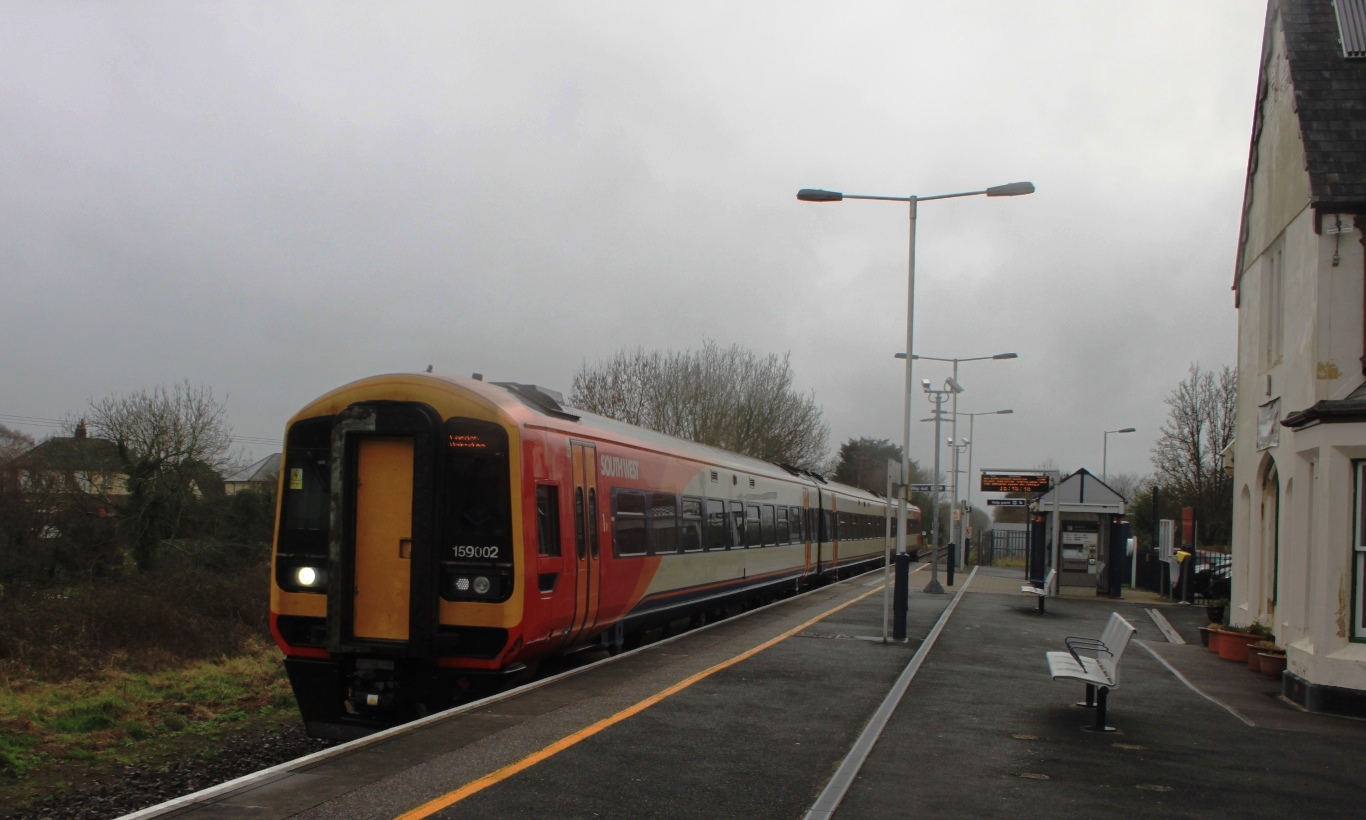
A South West Trains service for London Waterloo

All services at Whimple are operated by South Western Railway.

The typical off-peak service in trains per hour is one train every two hours between Exeter St Davids and London Waterloo via Salisbury, increasing to hourly at peak times.

Due to the short platform at this station, passengers wishing to alight need to be in the front 3 coaches of the train as the platform can only take 3-car trains.

Preceding station	National Rail	Following station
Feniton or Honiton	South Western Railway West of England line	Cranbrook

== See also ==
- Southern Railway routes west of Salisbury

== Bibliography ==
- Quick, Michael (2023). Railway Passenger Stations in Great Britain: A Chronology (PDF) (5th ed.). London: Railway and Canal Historical Society.
