= Broad Clyst railway station =

Defunct English rail station

Coordinates: 50.74671°N 3.43153°W

Broad Clyst
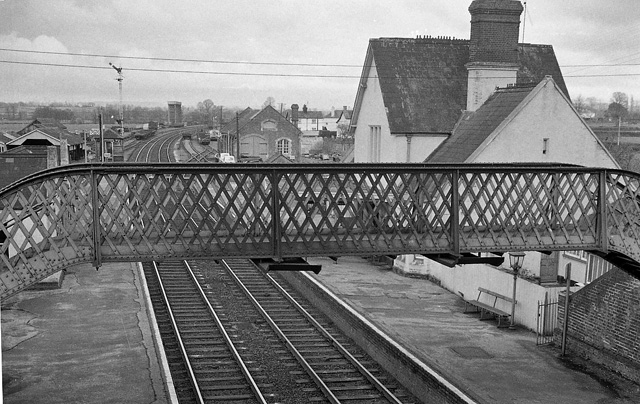
- The station in 1964

General information
- Location: Broadclyst, East Devon; England
- Grid reference: SX991951
- Platforms: 2

Other information
- Status: Disused

History
- Original company: London and South Western Railway
- Pre-grouping: London and South Western Railway
- Post-grouping: Southern Railway; Western Region of British Railways

Key dates
- 19 July 1860: Opened
- 6 September 1965: Closed to freight
- 7 March 1966: Closed to passengers
Location

Broad Clyst railway station is a disused railway station on the West of England Main Line which served the nearby village of Broadclyst from 1860 until its closure in 1966.

== History ==
Constructed by the London and South Western Railway to the Gothic designs of Sir William Tite, Broad Clyst station was actually more than a mile away from the small village of Broadclyst from which it was to draw most of its traffic. The naming of the station proved to be a source of controversy with the railway company preferring "Broad Clyst" over the Post Office's insistence that a single word be used. The station attracted residential development in the immediate area and even today the area around the former station is known as Broadclyst Station.

The station saw little change during its 106-year life, it had two short platforms - the Up one was capable of accommodating four carriages and the Down one only three; they were never extended as the station only served local trains. The station was lit by oil lamps until its closure. A small Chief Engineers' depot was located on the Up side and this was extended in 1929 with the laying of additional sidings. At the depot was based a small departmental engine used for shunting operations.

The station saw mainly passenger traffic and goods traffic was fairly light, particularly as there was no resident coal merchant. Nevertheless, from the early 1960s a local manufacturer of three-wheel invalid cars began regularly sending his goods by rail. However, the decision was taken in 1963 to close the engineers' depot and, in 1965, to concentrate goods traffic on Exeter. At the same time, the Broad Clyst station itself was put forward for closure as part of the package of economies proposed by the Beeching Report. Goods traffic ceased in 1965, with passenger traffic ending the following year.

Preceding station	Disused railways	Following station
Whimple	London and South Western Railway; Salisbury to Exeter	Pinhoe

== The station today ==
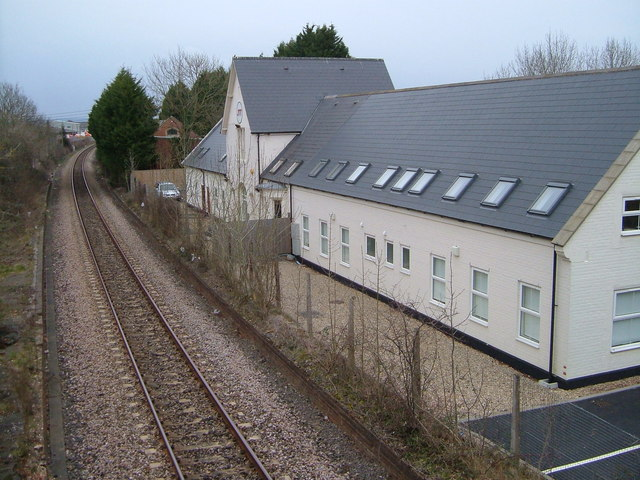
The station today

In 1998 a proposal was discussed in the House of Commons to open a station at Broadclyst which would serve a new settlement of 3,000 houses be constructed nearby and to be known as "Clyst Hayes", although this has since been changed to "Cranbrook" and so Cranbrook railway station opened in December 2015, approximately 500m from the former Broad Clyst station site in the direction of Whimple.

The former station building and goods shed remain in commercial use on the Down side. The station building was completely renovated in 2006.
