= Pinhoe railway station =

Railway station in Devon, England

Pinhoe
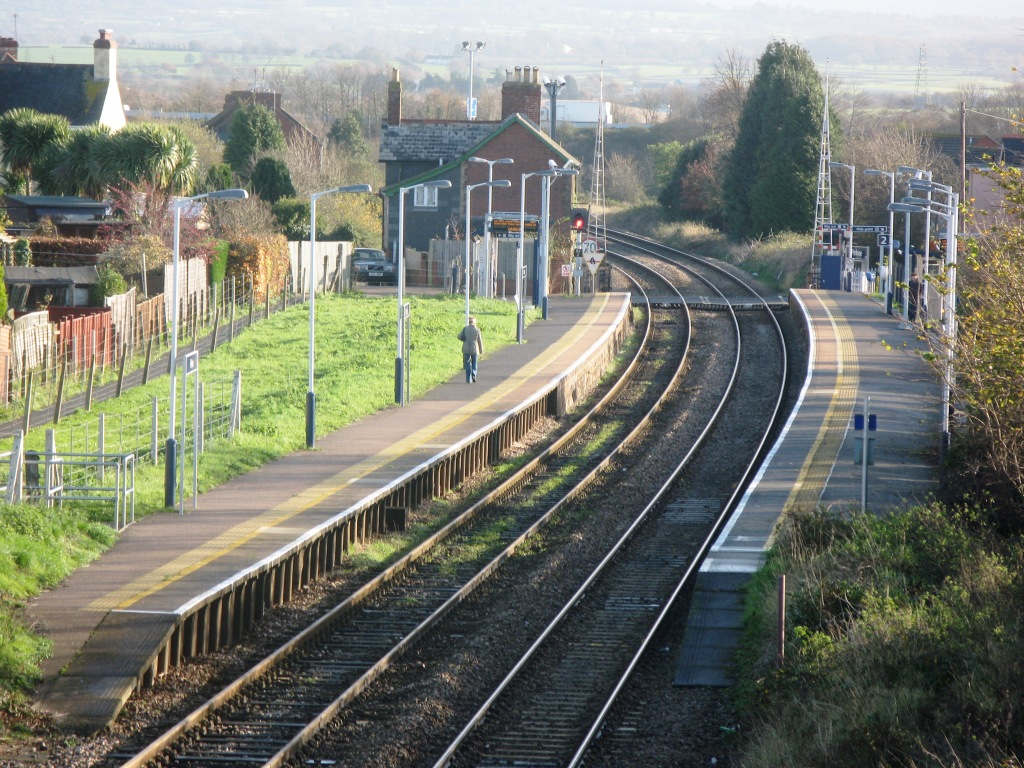

General information
- Location: Pinhoe, Exeter; England, United Kingdom
- Coordinates: 50.7377°N 3.4698°W
- Grid reference: SX962941
- Managed by: South Western Railway
- Platforms: 2

Other information
- Station code: PIN
- Classification: DfT category F2

History
- Original company: London and South Western Railway
- Post-grouping: Southern Railway

Key dates
- 1871: Opened
- 1966: Closed for passengers
- 1967: Closed for goods
- 1983: Reopened

Passengers
- 2020/21: ▼46,198
- 2021/22: ▲0.139 million
- 2022/23: ▲0.166 million
- 2023/24: ▲0.192 million
- 2024/25: ▲0.232 million
Location
Notes
- Passenger statistics from the Office of Rail and Road

Pinhoe railway station is a railway station located on the eastern edge of the city of Exeter in Devon, England, that serves the village of Pinhoe. It was opened by the London and South Western Railway (LSWR) in 1871, but is now operated by South Western Railway, which provides services on the West of England Main Line. It is 168 miles 44 chains (271.3 km) down the line from London Waterloo and is between Exeter Central and Cranbrook.

== History ==
The LSWR opened its Exeter Extension from Yeovil Junction to Exeter Queen Street on 19 July 1860, but no station was provided at Pinhoe at that time. The village's station opened eleven years later on 30 October 1871. The original wooden footbridge was replaced by a concrete structure cast at nearby Exmouth Junction works, the first such footbridge erected by the Southern Railway, which had taken over from the LSWR in 1923.

Goods facilities were provided from 3 April 1882, and in 1943 a government food cold store was built to the west of the station that was served by its own siding. The passenger station was closed on 7 March 1966, when the Western Region of British Railways withdrew the local stopping services from the line. Goods facilities were withdrawn on 10 June 1967 and the cold store siding (now operated by a private company) closed in 1979.

The station was reopened by British Rail on 16 May 1983. Passengers waiting at the reopened station have glass and metal shelters. Instead of serving a country village, it was now on the eastern edge of the expanding city. The initial trial period for commuter services proved successful, and a regular service now operates all day, seven days a week. Between 2003 and 2008, passenger numbers increased by 530%, and are still increasing with an estimate of 94,354 users in 2015–16, and in subsequent years consistently exceeding 100,000 passengers per year (except for 2020–21).

Preceding station	Historical railways	Following station
Broad Clyst	London and South Western Railway; Salisbury to Exeter	Whipton Bridge Halt

=== Signalling ===
The station was built next to the level crossing of Pinn Lane. This was operated by the station staff until 1875, when a small signal box was brought into use; it was situated on the north side of the line to the east of the road. The initial 11 levers were extended to 17 in 1943, when the cold store was built. On 11 June 1967 one of the two tracks between Pinhoe and Honiton was taken out of use, and trains towards London would often wait in the closed station for a westbound train to clear the 14-mile (23 km) single track section. The level crossing gates were replaced with lifting barriers on 17 March 1968. The signal box was closed on 13 February 1988, the level crossing and signals now being controlled from Exmouth Junction. The old signal box was dismantled and re-erected in the railway museum at Bere Ferrers on the Tamar Valley Line.

== Location ==
The station is just south of the village centre to the west of Station Road, and access to the platforms is from this road. A footpath also links the eastbound platform with Main Road.

== Facilities ==
The station has a ticket office and ticket machine, bike storage, benches and help points. There is step-free access to both platforms, linked by the level crossing.

== Passenger volume ==
Passenger volume at Pinhoe
	2004–05	2005–06	2006–07	2007–08	2008–09	2009–10	2010–11	2011–12	2012–13	2013–14	2014–15	2015–16	2016–17	2017–18	2018–19	2019–20	2020–21	2021–22	2022–23	2023–24	2024–25
Entries and exits	12,959	17,777	23,931	29,278	38,110	38,326	41,592	47,320	52,512	55,306	88,872	94,354	94,242	116,626	117,096	130,044	46,198	138,578	166,352	192,290	231,830

The statistics cover twelve month periods that start in April.

== Services ==
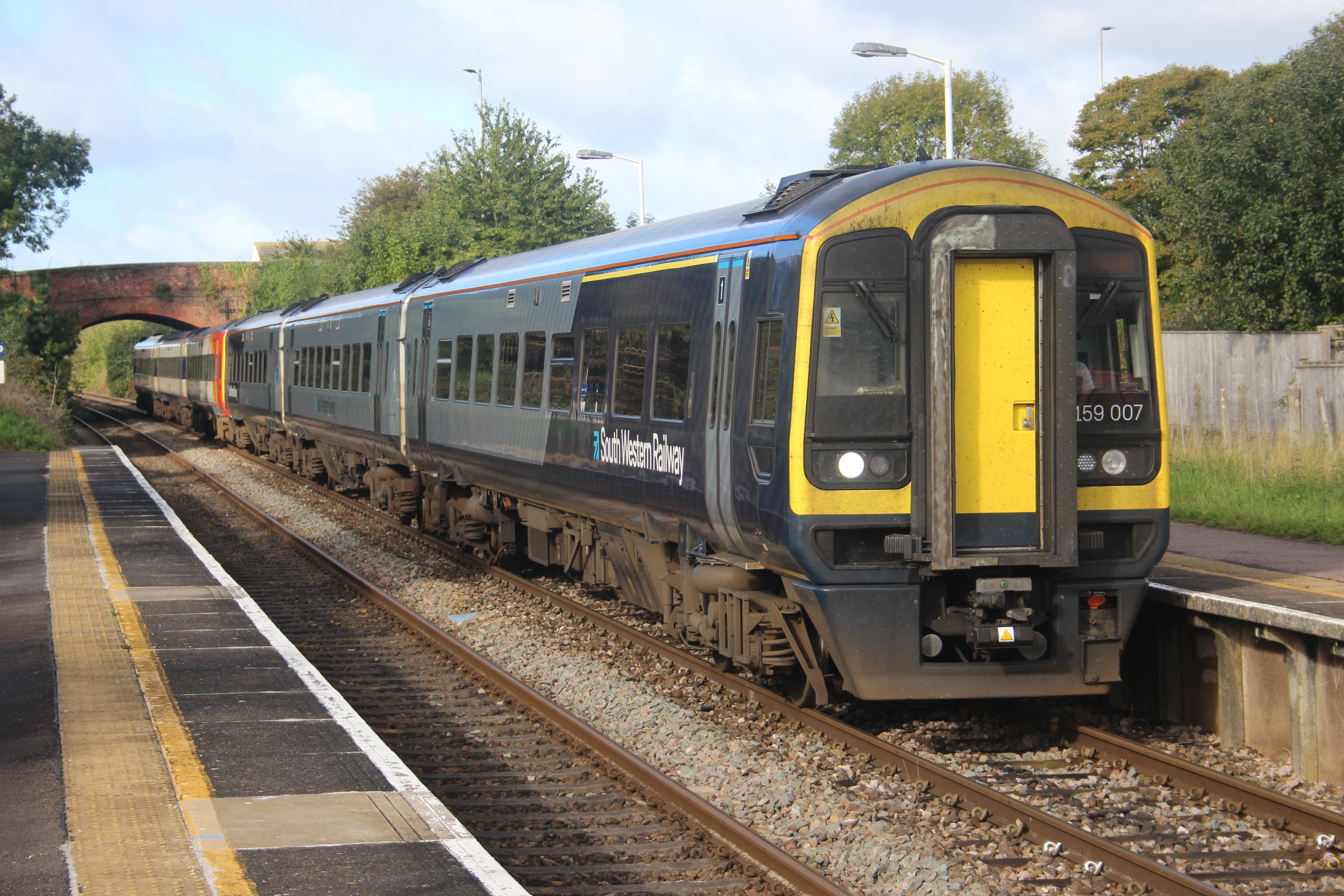
South Western Railway Class 159 units arrive into Pinhoe working a London Waterloo service

Off-peak, all services at Pinhoe are operated by South Western Railway.

The average off-peak service in trains per hour is:

- 1 tph to London Waterloo via Salisbury
- 1 tph to Exeter St Davids

The station is also served by a single weekday peak hour service from Barnstaple to Axminster, which is operated by Great Western Railway.

Preceding station	National Rail	Following station
Cranbrook	South Western Railway West of England Main Line	Exeter Central
Cranbrook	Great Western Railway West of England Main Line Limited Service	Exeter Central

== See also ==
- Southern Railway routes west of Salisbury

== Bibliography ==
- Quick, Michael (2023). Railway Passenger Stations in Great Britain: A Chronology (PDF) (5th ed.). London: Railway and Canal Historical Society.
