= Cranbrook railway station (Devon) =

Train station in Devon, England

Cranbrook
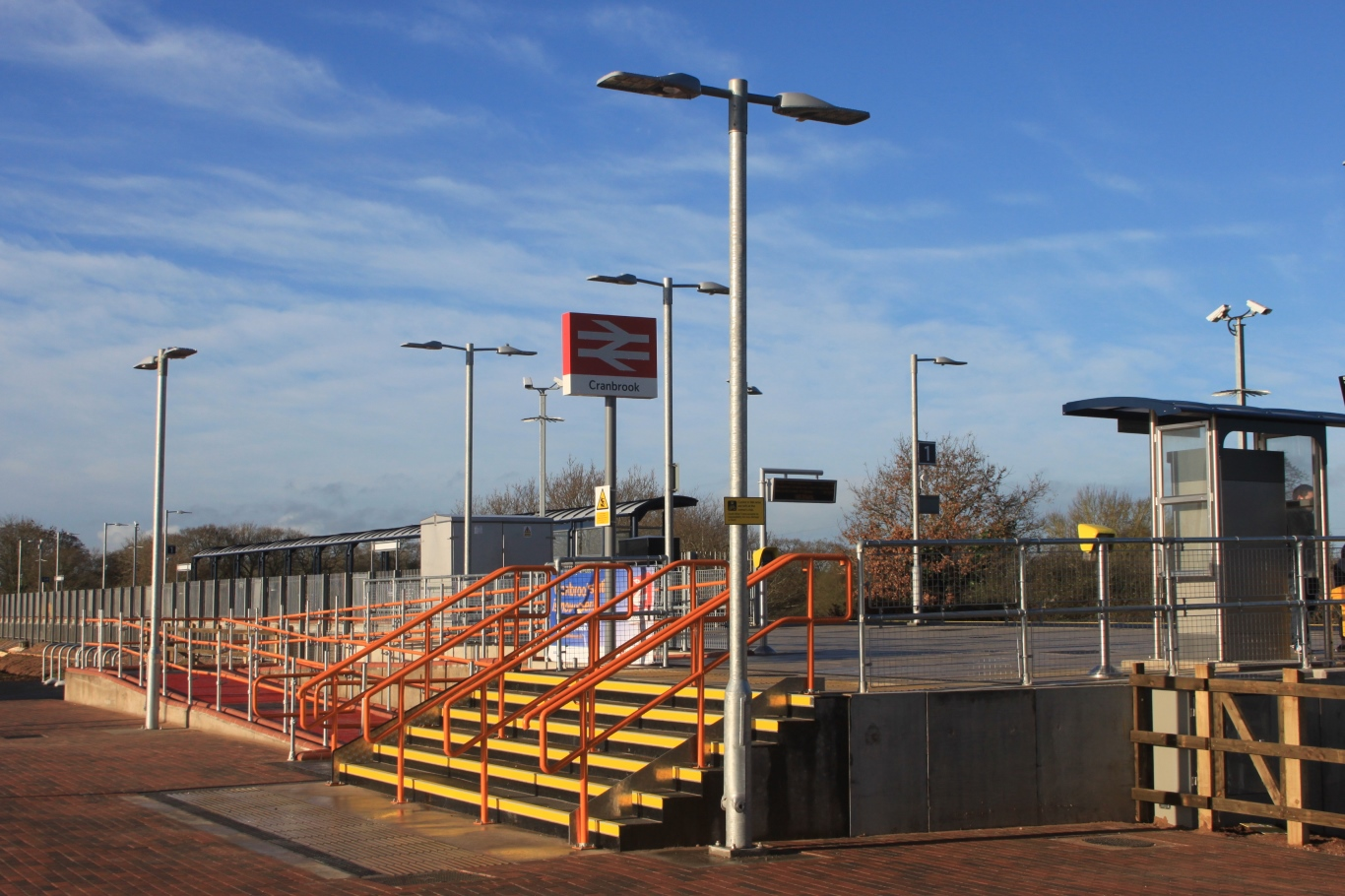

General information
- Location: Cranbrook, Devon, East Devon; England
- Coordinates: 50.7501°N 3.4206°W
- Managed by: South Western Railway
- Platforms: 1

Other information
- Station code: CBK

Key dates
- 13 December 2015: Opened

Passengers
- 2020/21: ▼29,804
- 2021/22: ▲95,524
- 2022/23: ▲0.103 million
- 2023/24: ▲0.115 million
- 2024/25: ▲0.120 million
Location
Notes
- Passenger statistics from the Office of Rail and Road

Cranbrook railway station serves the new town of Cranbrook near Exeter in Devon, England. The station is on the West of England Main Line between Whimple and Pinhoe stations, 166 miles 15 chains (267.5 km) down the line from London Waterloo. It is the newest station on the line, having opened in December 2015.

Despite being the closest station to Exeter Airport (2.2 miles away), there is not yet a public transport link between the two, but in 2015 a direct bus route was expected to be introduced after the station's completion, to help improve the town's poor level of bus service.

== History ==
The station was originally expected to open in 2013, and the 2014 timetables included an additional two minutes for trains passing the station. However, detailed design of the station began only in summer 2014, and construction started that autumn with opening initially due in spring 2015, but problems with a sewer and railway signalling postponed the opening for a then unknown duration. In August 2015, the opening was announced for October. By October 2015, it transpired that the station would not open until 13 December 2015. The station cost £5m to build.

== Facilities ==
The station's single platform has a usable length of 150 metres (490 ft) to accommodate the six-car trains that operate on the route. There is a car park with 150 spaces and a ticket machine.

== Services ==
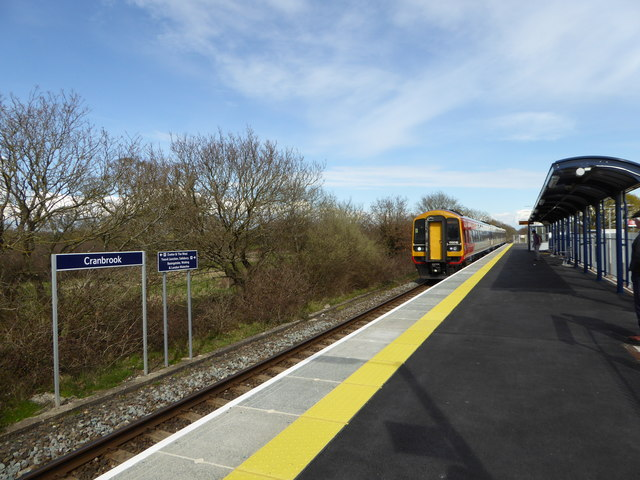
A Class 159 arrives at the station

Off-peak, all services at Cranbrook are operated by South Western Railway.

The typical off-peak service in trains per hour is:

- 1 tph to London Waterloo via Salisbury
- 1 tph to Exeter St Davids

The station is also served by a single weekday peak hour service from Barnstaple to Axminster which is operated by Great Western Railway.

Preceding station	National Rail	Following station
Whimple	South Western Railway West of England line	Pinhoe
Feniton	South Western Railway West of England line	Pinhoe
Feniton	Great Western Railway West of England line Limited Service	Pinhoe
