= Rockbeare =

Village in Devon, England

Coordinates: 50.75°N 3.383333°W

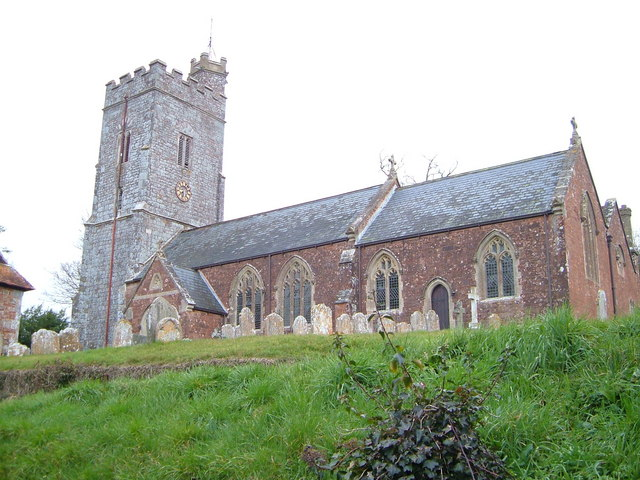
- St Mary with St Andrew, Rockbeare

- Location within Devon
- Population: 914 (2011 Census)
- OS grid reference: SY0242295464
  - London: 196 mi (315 km)
- Civil parish: Rockbeare
- District: East Devon
- Shire county: Devon
- Region: South West
- Country: England
- Sovereign state: United Kingdom
- Post town: Exeter
- Postcode district: EX5
- Dialling code: 01392
- Police: Devon and Cornwall
- Fire: Devon and Somerset
- Ambulance: South Western
- UK Parliament: Exmouth and Exeter East
- Website: http://rockbeareparishcouncil.co.uk

Rockbeare is a village and civil parish in the East Devon district of the county of Devon, England, located near Exeter Airport and the city of Exeter. "Whilst the name has nothing to do with either 'rocks' nor 'bears', it simply means 'rooks in the grove (of trees)'." "The parish comprises the hamlets of Marsh Green, Pithead, Allercombe, and Little Silver". The village, which is of small extent, is situated on the high road from Honiton to Exeter, and is an agricultural town. The land is nearly evenly divided between arable and pasture, with about 200 acres of common. According to the 2011 Census there were 431 males and 483 females living in the parish. "Rockbeare is written within the Broadclyst ward and electoral division, which is in the constituency of East Devon County Council".

Rockbeare has a grade II* listed church dedicated to St Mary with St Andrew, Rockbeare and a football club called Rockbeare Rangers FC. Rockbeare Manor is a grade I listed building.

== History ==
=== 19th Century Rockbeare ===
Historically Rockbeare formed as part of East Budleigh Hundred. During this period the population was 419 in 1801 and 404 in 1901.

"Rockbeare Manor, also known as 'Rock Wood' was given by the Bishop of Bath and Wells to Matilda, Countess of Gloucester in the reign of Edward III. From the Countess the manor passed to the abbey of Canonleigh, while at the Reformation it was acquired by the Sainthill family. The original house was built c. 1760-70 and owned by Sir John Duntze. About 1820 the house was remodelled with complete simplicity and refinement, possibly by Kendall of Exeter."

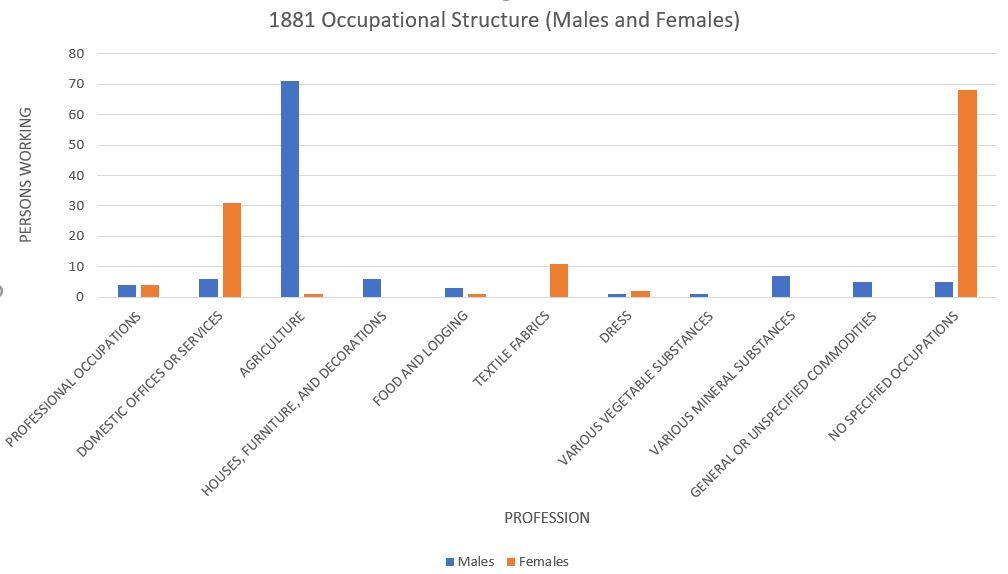
Column chart showing the occupational structures for men and women in 1881

Chart^{1} shows the occupational status for the population in 1881, the general trend is that although most people were working in the services and agricultural sector, many worked in unspecified occupations.

"Rockbeare Court, beside the church, is a plain stuccoed late Georgian mansion. The church (St. Mary) is a melancholy exhibition of "restoration": it was almost entirely rebuilt in 1888 and is devoid of interest."

=== Post 1800 ===
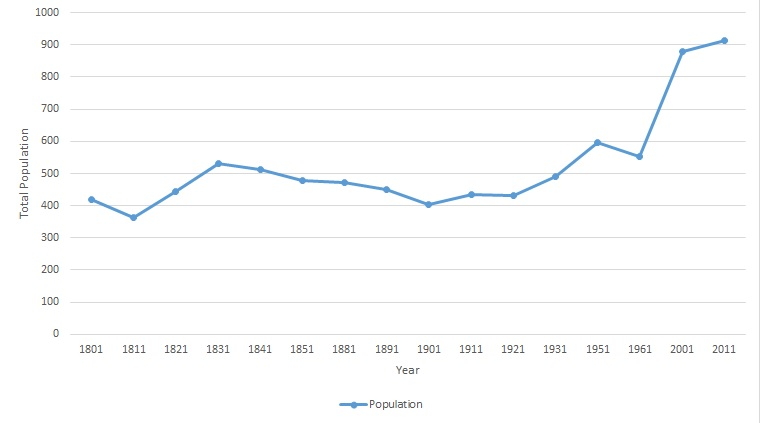
Total Population of Rockbeare Civil Parish, Exeter, as reported by the Census of Population from 1801 to 2011

"Rockbeare, par. and vil., Devon, 6½ miles E. of Exeter, 2375 ac., pop. 472; P.O.; Rockbeare House and Rockbeare Court are seats. The manor belonged formerly to Canonsleigh-abbey, and belongs now to T. Porter, Esq. R. House and R. Court are chief residences. The living is a vicarage in the diocese of Exeter. Value, £148.* Patron, the Bishop of Exeter."

=== Roman links ===
Evidence for Rockbeare to have been part of a Roman settlement came from the University of Exeter's Archaeology team who have revealed new findings of how the county's inhabitants lived during the Roman period. The team also uncovered archaeological features and significant amounts of imported Roman pottery, along with locally made goods. The site was first discovered by metal detectorists Jim Wills and Dennis Hewings who reported their finds to archaeologist Danielle Wootton, who is the Devon Finds Liaison Officer (Antiquities Scheme). All of these findings suggest that people having lived in this area were influenced in some way by the Romans. It is questioned "whether the Dumnonii, the tribe who lived in the area now known as Devon, still retained their traditional identity rather than becoming entirely Romanised."

== Geography ==
=== Climate ===
Rockbeare, as with the rest of the UK, experiences an oceanic climate (Köppen Cfb). Its southern location makes it one of the warmest parts in England. Mean average data has been sourced from the Met Office, data has been collected from the Exeter Airport climate station. Below are the annual average temperatures for Rockbeare and Exeter Airport area.

Climate data for Rockbeare, England (1981-2010)
Month	Jan	Feb	Mar	Apr	May	Jun	Jul	Aug	Sep	Oct	Nov	Dec	Year
Mean daily maximum °C (°F)	8.8 (47.8)	8.8 (47.8)	11.1 (52.0)	13.3 (55.9)	16.8 (62.2)	19.8 (67.6)	21.7 (71.1)	21.5 (70.7)	19.2 (66.6)	15.2 (59.4)	11.7 (53.1)	9.8 (49.6)	14.8 (58.7)
Mean daily minimum °C (°F)	2.7 (36.9)	2.4 (36.3)	3.7 (38.7)	4.5 (40.1)	7.6 (45.7)	10.5 (50.9)	12.4 (54.3)	12.3 (54.1)	10.3 (50.5)	8.0 (46.4)	4.8 (40.6)	2.4 (36.3)	6.8 (44.2)
Average precipitation mm (inches)	82.2 (3.24)	60.7 (2.39)	56.8 (2.24)	62.1 (2.44)	57.2 (2.25)	48.4 (1.91)	45.8 (1.80)	53.4 (2.10)	58.8 (2.31)	88.9 (3.50)	83.4 (3.28)	87.3 (3.44)	785 (30.9)
Source: Exeter Airport

== Economy ==
Most local businesses are located along London Rd. Rockbeare Quarry located above Allercombe, Upcott and Pithead was a former quarry used to produce gravel, cement, bricks, tar and stones until 1986.

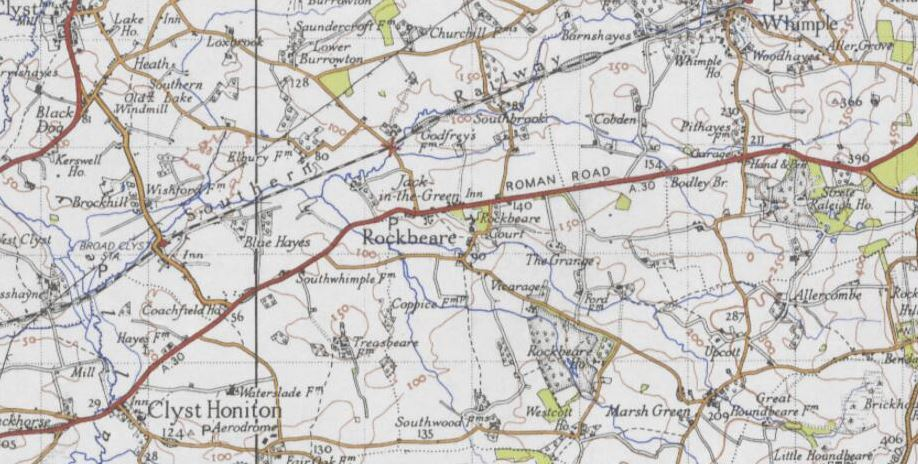
Historic map of Rockbeare

=== Cranbrook development ===
Cranbrook is located just north-west of the village of Rockbeare. This provides opportunity for a structure plan, following a development proposal that would incorporate the parish of Rockbeare.

"The vision for Cranbrook is to create a self-sufficient, low carbon new community in close proximity to skilled employment opportunities, encouraging people to use sustainable modes of transport and to reduce the need for them to travel between work and home by car."

The aim is to become a modern market town with close functional links with the other developments in the growth area, such as Skypark and Exeter Science Park. It is also envisioned to construct sustainable homes, as well as offer affordable housing for young families. As a result, Rockbeare and Cranbrook would merge. Rockbeare, however, is strongly opposed as it would have to compromise 820 residential dwellings, one primary school, cemetery, sports and recreation facilities.

== Culture and community ==
Rockbeare has a well-appointed manor "perfect for weddings and other occasions including celebration dinners, parties, corporate team building days and charity fundraisers." St. Mary's with St. Andrew's Church is the main church in the civil parish of Rockbeare. The former Independent Chapel located near the quarry has survived and been renamed to Marsh Green's village hall.

== Transport ==
Exeter Airport is located approximately 2.9 miles south west of Rockbeare. Bus services to the city centre run hourly and are operated by Stagecoach.

Cranbrook offers a rail station with services run by South Western Railway to Exeter, London Waterloo, and Gillingham.

== Education ==
Rockbeare Church of England Primary School was established in 1872. Following the July 2012 Ofsted inspection, the school was rated 2 "Good".
