= Cranbrook, Devon =

Town in Devon, England

Coordinates: 50.747°N 3.413°W

Cranbrook
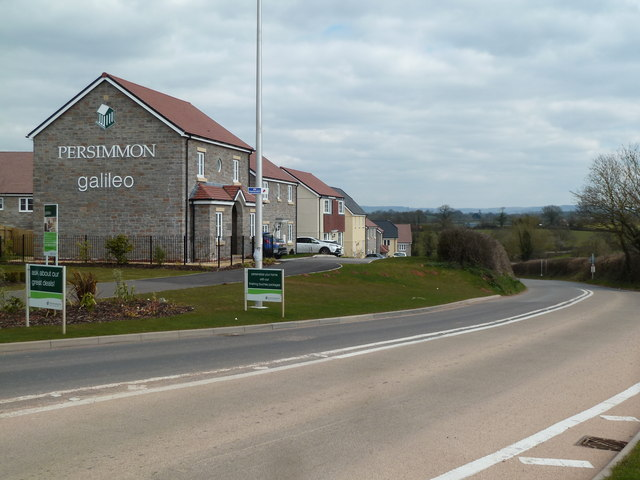
- New buildings in Cranbrook

- Location within Devon
- Population: 6,743 (as of March 2021)
- Civil parish: Cranbrook
- District: East Devon
- Shire county: Devon
- Region: South West
- Country: England
- Sovereign state: United Kingdom
- Post town: EXETER
- Postcode district: EX5
- Dialling code: 01404
- Police: Devon and Cornwall
- Fire: Devon and Somerset
- Ambulance: South Western
- UK Parliament: Exmouth and Exeter East

Cranbrook is a new town being developed in East Devon, England across eight "phases". At the 2021 census, it had a population of 6,743 residents and is continuing to grow at a fast pace. It is located 6 mi (9 km) east-north-east of Exeter and north-west of Rockbeare, between the B3174 road (London Road and former A30) and the West of England Main Line railway. The civil parish was formed on 1 April 2015.

== History ==
The idea and requirements to construct houses on greenfield land in the area were first proposed in 1995, and appeared in both the Devon 2001-2016 Structure Plan and the East Devon Local Plan 1995-2001. The first houses were occupied as St Martin's C of E Primary school was completed in 2012 and at least 500 houses had been occupied by December 2013. As of March 2021, the Cranbrook Parish had rapidly grown to a population of 6,743.

The first phase of the Cranbrook development is known as "Younghayes". A primary school (St Martin's C of E) opened in September 2012. The Younghayes Centre is complete and is used as a meeting point for clubs, meetings and events. There is also a neighbourhood centre with a general shop and a pharmacy, Cranbrook was earnmarked as a pioneering "healthy town" with the aim “To create a healthy, vibrant, attractive and sustainable town”

The town was promised a railway station within the masterplan, the station was originally expected to open in 2013, and the 2014 timetables included an additional two minutes for trains passing the station. However, detailed design of the station began only in summer 2014, and construction started that autumn with opening initially due in spring 2015, but problems with a sewer and railway signalling postponed the opening for a then unknown duration. In August 2015, the opening was announced for October. By October 2015, it transpired that the station would not open until 13 December 2015. The station cost £5m to build and serves the West Of England Line.

In September 2018, Cranbrook hosted the start of Stage 2 of the OVO Energy Tour of Britain cycle race.

The second phase includes a second primary school and a secondary school as part of the all-through Cranbrook Education Campus, as well as a town centre. Promises were given in late 2021 by East Devon District Council that an agreement had been reached for a Morrisons supermarket to be built south of the Cranberry Farm pub, to be open in September 2023.

The supermarket and accompanying shops were delayed, with the supermarket opening in December 2024 and respective retail units opening at similar dates

The first 7 retail units are now either fully functional, or will be, with only one unit left empty- and the nursery is expected to be open for the next school year in September.

== Accessibility and transport ==
Cranbrook railway station, on the Exeter–Waterloo line, opened in 2015. The project cost over £5 million, and provides an hourly service to Exeter and London Waterloo.

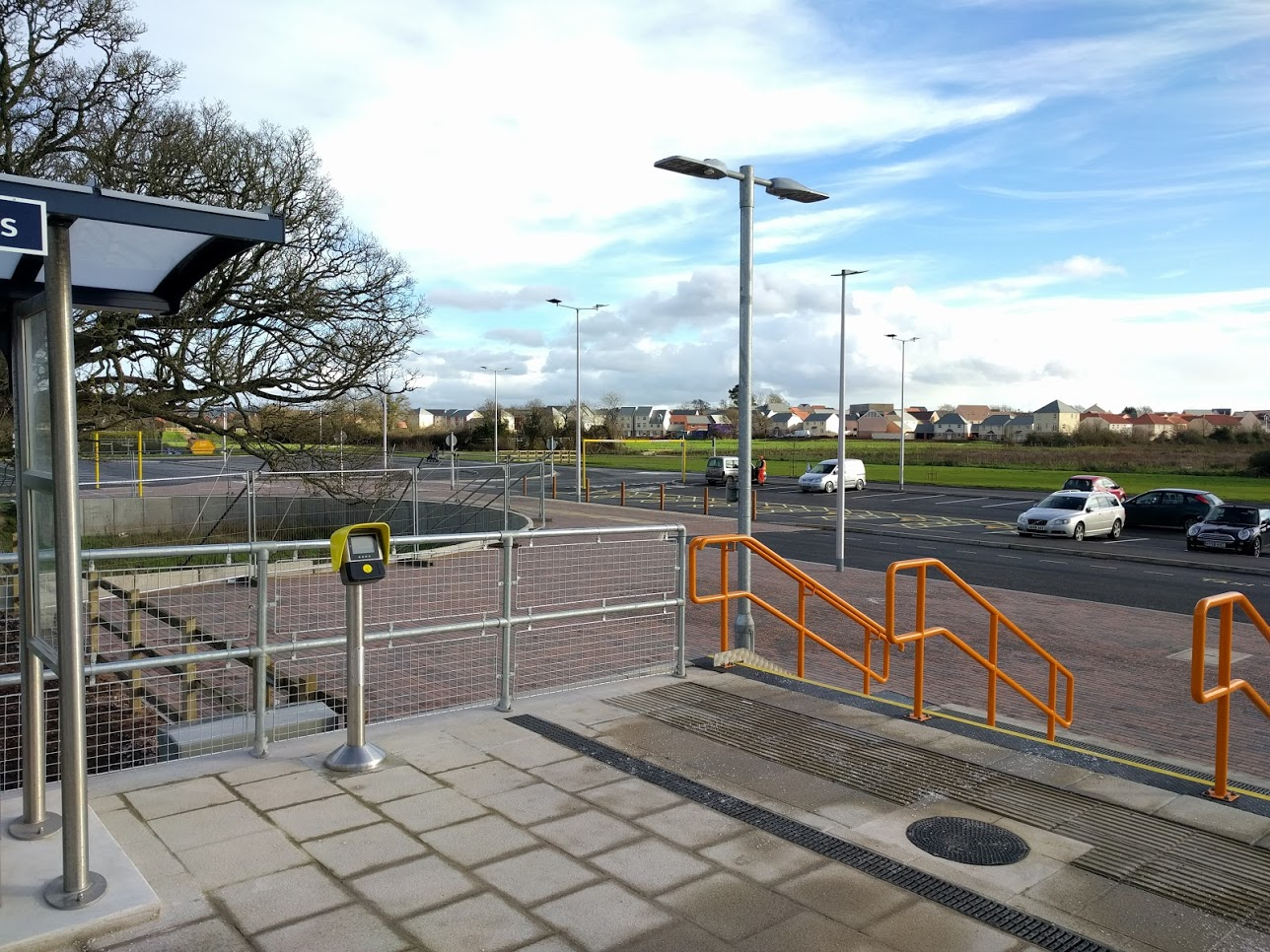
Cranbrook, as seen from the train station

Stagecoach South West operate three bus routes serving the town: the 4 between Exeter, Cranbrook, Ottery St Mary, Honiton and Axminster; the 4A between Exeter, Cranbrook, West Hill, Ottery St Mary and Honiton; and the 4B which is an early morning bus which goes to Exeter, Cranbrook, West Hill, Ottery St Mary, Honiton and Axminster. On Sundays the only service to run is the 4 as a reduced service from Exeter to Cranbrook.

Cranbrook is 2.2 miles (3.5 km) from Exeter International Airport.

In the 2010s, the Clyst Honiton Bypass was created specifically to accommodate the new town. It connects Honiton Road to the A30 and M5 (Junction 29), both of which experienced improvements, such as Redhayes Bridge (a pedestrian and cycle bridge over the M5 that connects Cranbrook to the rest of Exeter) which opened at the time.

== Facilities ==
Developers Redrow Homes are consulting with the local authority to build a further 1035 new homes. Other developers such as Persimmon Homes, Linden, Bovis and Taylor Wimpey are constructing homes close to the Cranbrook Education Campus and in Phase 7 and 8.

The Country Park was a conservationist policy implemented in the town, it provides an area of green space and trees for socialising, sports etc. A landscaping business behind the project won a secondary trade award for the category "Grounds Maintenance - Free Public Access" in 2022 due to the work they did on the project.

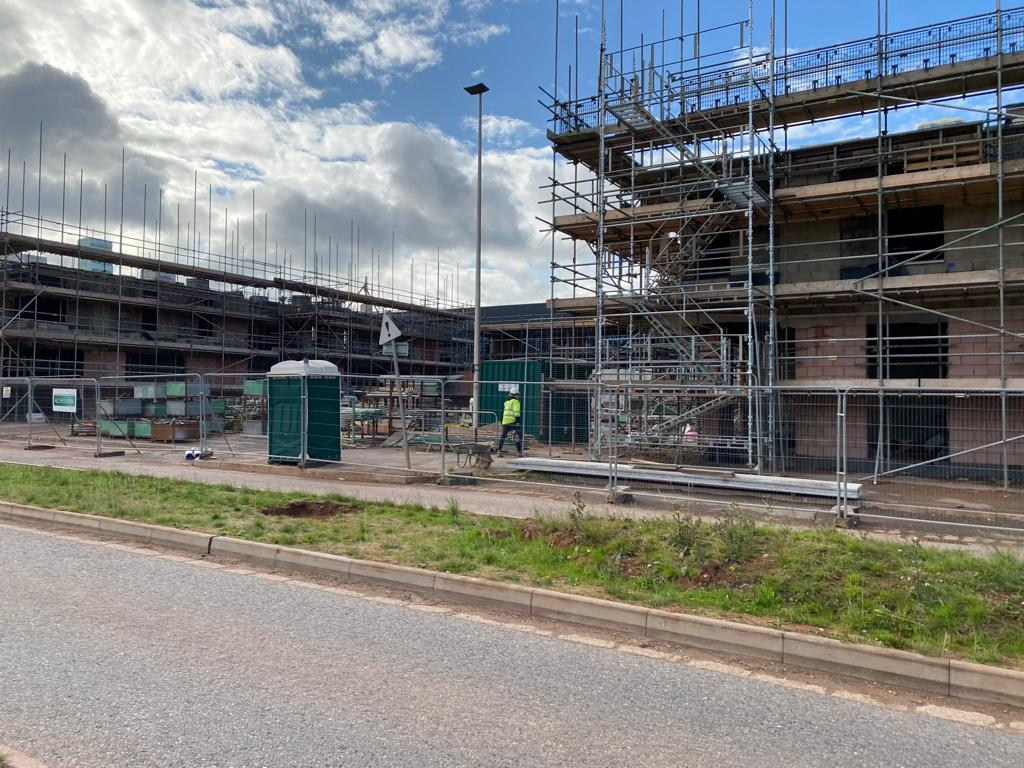
Cranbrook Town Centre under construction.
