= Honiton railway station =

Railway station in Devon, England

Honiton
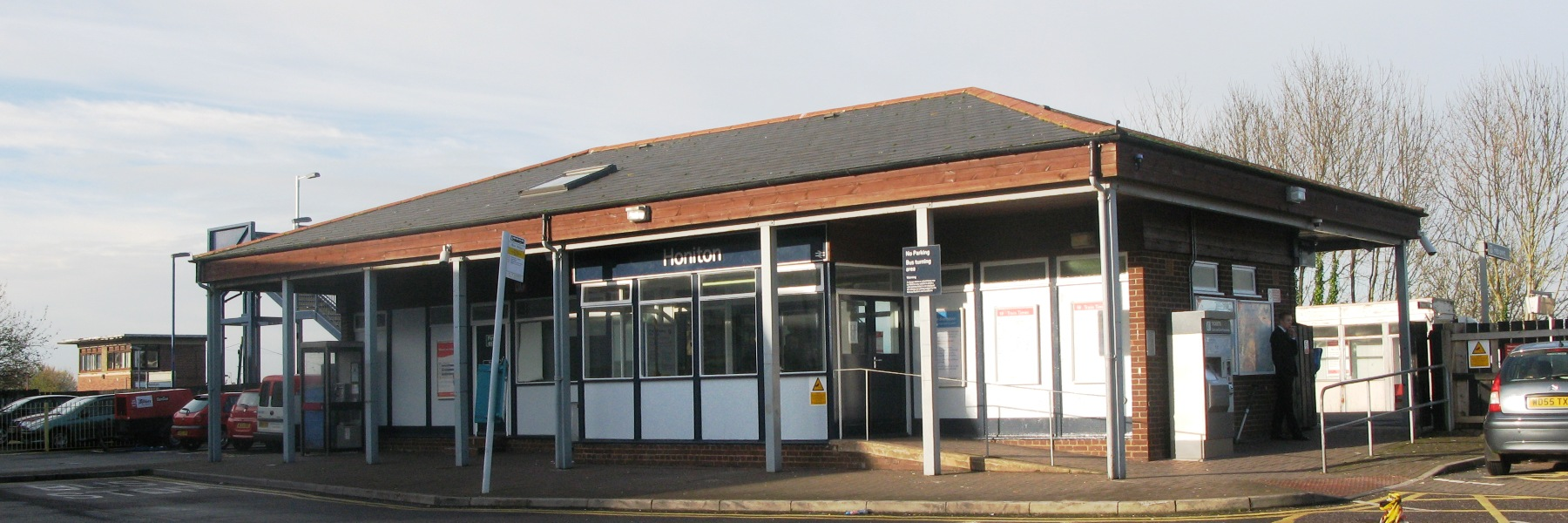
- Honiton station in 2009

General information
- Location: Honiton, East Devon; England
- Coordinates: 50.797°N 3.187°W
- Grid reference: ST164003
- Managed by: South Western Railway
- Platforms: 2

Other information
- Station code: HON
- Classification: DfT category D

History
- Original company: London and South Western Railway
- Post-grouping: Southern Railway

Key dates
- 19 July 1860: Opened

Passengers
- 2020/21: ▼0.110 million
- Interchange: ▼1,747
- 2021/22: ▲0.255 million
- Interchange: ▲9,209
- 2022/23: ▲0.288 million
- Interchange: ▲11,251
- 2023/24: ▲0.314 million
- Interchange: ▼9,304
- 2024/25: ▲0.337 million
- Interchange: ▼9,084
Location
Notes
- Passenger statistics from the Office of Rail and Road

Honiton railway station serves the town of Honiton in east Devon, England. It is operated by South Western Railway and is 154 miles 60 chains (249.0 km) down the line from London Waterloo, on the West of England Line, between Feniton and Axminster.

== History ==
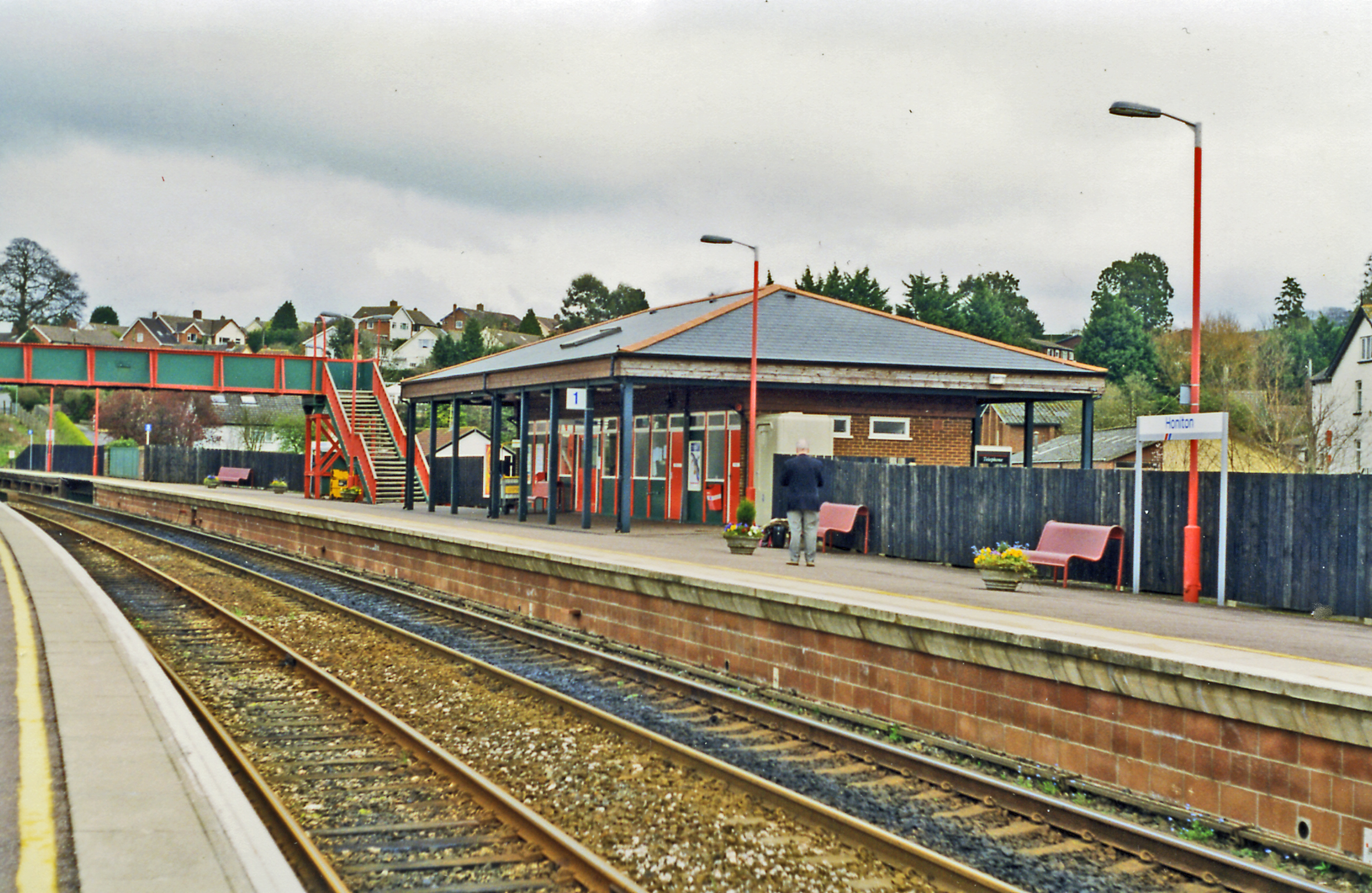
The station seen in 1998

The first proposal for a railway to Honiton came in 1852 when a Devon and Dorset Railway was promoted jointly by the Great Western Railway and Bristol and Exeter Railway. This would have linked Dorchester with Exeter, running close to Bridport then through Axminster, Honiton and Ottery St Mary. This caused the London and South Western Railway (LSWR) to make a binding commitment to parliament in 1853 that they would build a more direct route from Salisbury to Exeter. Parliament agreed to the LSWR's plan rather than the Devon and Dorset scheme. The LSWR did not immediately start to build their route but parliament forced them to honour their commitment in 1855 and so they obtained the London and South Western Railway (Exeter Extension) Act 1856 and the line between Yeovil Junction and Exeter Queen Street, including the station at Honiton, opened on 19 July 1860.

The station was designed by William Tite with the main building on the westbound platform, even though this is the side furthest from the town centre. The station was on an embankment on the west side of New Street and the goods yard with a small goods shed was on the south side beyond the station building. Further sidings were provided on the north side of the line opposite the main goods yard. Goods facilities were withdrawn on 8 May 1967.

A new footbridge was erected at in August 2009 to replace an older footbridge. The new footbridge was located towards the Exeter end of the station.

=== Accidents and incidents ===
On Sunday 4 October 2009 at 11.45pm, a man escaped injuries after he walked onto the railway line at Honiton Railway Station. Police stated that a train managed to stop without hitting the man. Shortly afterwards, the 33-year-old man was sent to hospital to take a mental health assessment.

=== Signalling ===
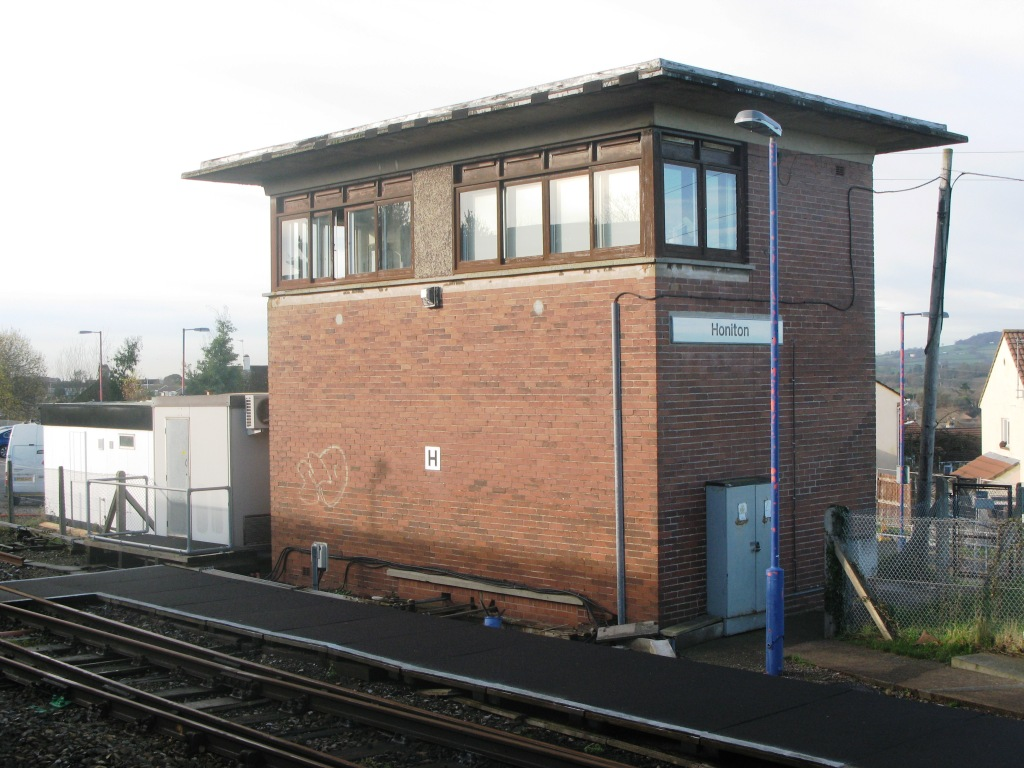
The 1957 signal box which has since been demolished.

A signal box was built in 1875 at the Exeter end of the station on the south side of the line. This was replaced by a new building on 16 June 1957 which was on the opposite side of the tracks. On 11 June 1967 the line from Chard Junction to Pinhoe was reduced to a single track but a loop line was retained at Honiton to allow trains to pass midway on this 29-mile (47 km) section. The westbound platform was signalled to allow eastbound trains to use it when they are not crossing a train coming in the opposite direction. In December 2009 a new loop was installed at Axminster to break up the section towards Chard. One siding was retained to the west of the signal box, worked by a ground frame rather than from the signal box itself.

Another signal box was provided at Honiton Incline. This was situated on the north side of the line beyond the 1,345-yard (1,230 m) Honiton Tunnel. The line climbs from Feniton towards Honiton at 1 in 100 (1%) and then continues up to the tunnel mouth a slightly steeper gradients, it then drops at 1 in 80 (1.25%) down to the former Seaton Junction.

== Facilities ==
A modern station building stands on the main platform which is on the southern side of the line. A footbridge to the west of this links the northern platform which has a small waiting shelter. The 1957-built signal box at the Exeter end of this platform closed and was demolished in 2012. The main station car park is situated behind the former site of the signal box.

The station saw a refurbishment in Spring 2011, providing a new booking hall, more CCTV, shelters and increased accessibility. Work on the improvement scheme started in early December 2010 and the completed refurbishment was officially unveiled on Thursday 23 June 2011. To mark the completion, Andy Pitt, managing director for South West Trains along with councillor Stuart Hughes from Devon County Council gathered at the station for a photo and unveiling.

== Passenger volume ==
Passengers starting or finishing their journeys at Honiton have exceeded 300,000 every year since 2010 except during 2020 when there were travel restrictions during the COVID-19 pandemic.

Passengers by year
Year (Note: The passenger data covers twelve month periods that start in April.)	Entries and exits
2004–05	256,356
2005–06	252,128
2006–07	263,627
2007–08	284,482
2008–09	293,298
2009–10	292,900
2010–11	326,892
2011–12	353,204
2012–13	379,232
2013–14	395,240
2014–15	391,860
2015–16	389,784
2016–17	390,050
2017–18	376,750
2018–19	359,130
2019–20	330,582
2020–21	110,386
2021–22	255,166
2022–23	288,228
2023–24	313,530
2024–25	337,040

== Services ==
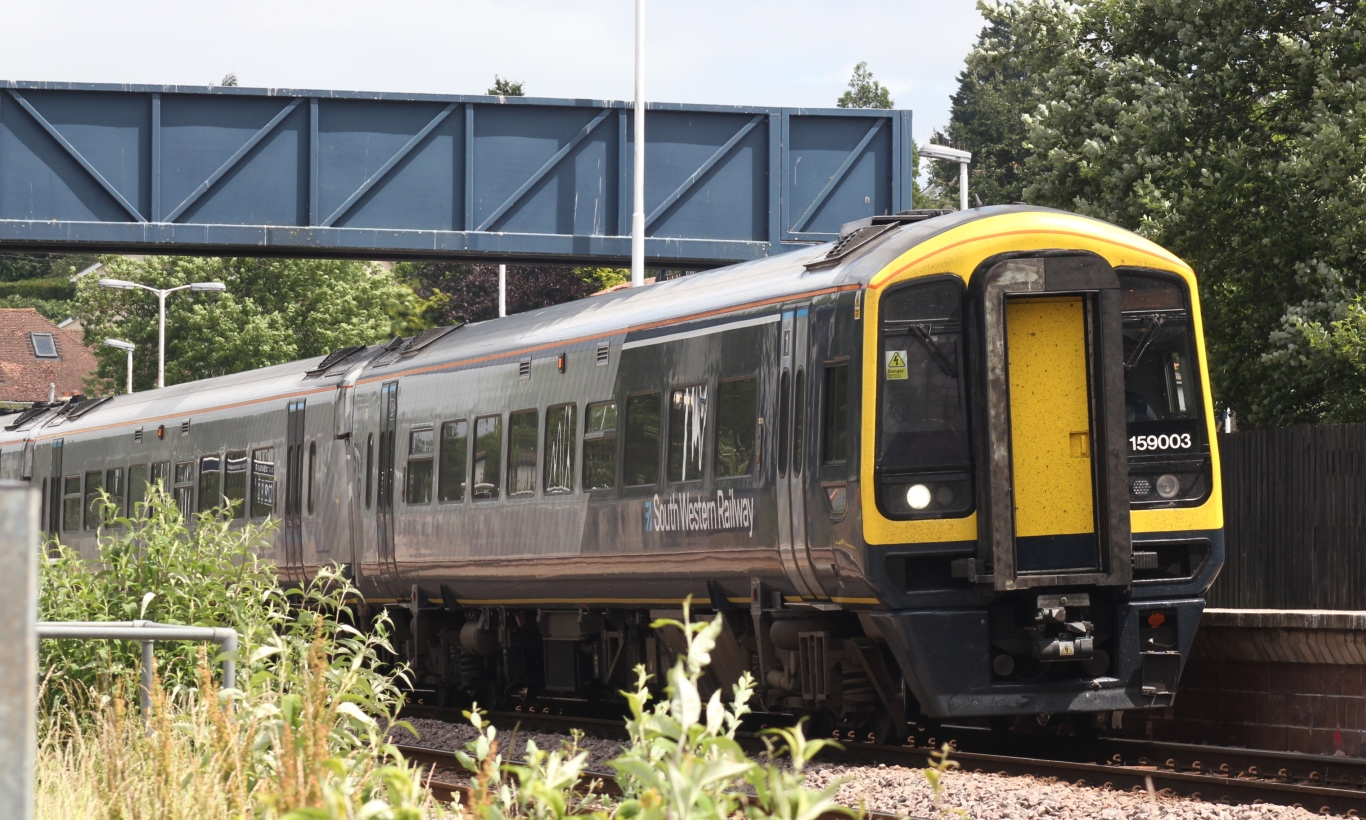
A South Western Railway Class 159 going to Exeter St Davids

Honiton is served by one South Western Railway train per hour in each direction on the route between London Waterloo and Exeter St Davids. There is also a single Great Western Railway service from Barnstaple to Axminster each evening Monday to Friday.

Preceding station	National Rail	Following station
Feniton	South Western Railway (West of England Line)	Axminster
Feniton	Great Western Railway (West of England Line); Limited service	Axminster

== See also ==
- Southern Railway routes west of Salisbury

== Bibliography ==
- Quick, Michael (2023). Railway Passenger Stations in Great Britain: A Chronology (PDF) (5th ed.). London: Railway and Canal Historical Society.
