= Exmouth and Exeter East =

UK Parliament constituency (since 2024)

- County constituency for the House of Commons
- Interactive map of boundaries from 2024
- Boundary of Exmouth and Exeter East in South West England
- County: Devon
- Electorate: 79,983 (2024)
- Major settlements: Budleigh Salterton, Cranbrook, Exeter, Exmouth, Topsham

Current constituency
- Created: 2024
- Member of Parliament: David Reed (Conservative)
- Seats: One
- Created from: East Devon, Exeter & Central Devon

Exmouth and Exeter East is a constituency of the House of Commons in the UK Parliament. It was first contested in the 2024 general election and is currently represented by David Reed of the Conservative Party.

The constituency name refers to the seaside Devon town of Exmouth and the eastern suburbs of the city of Exeter.

== Constituency profile ==
The Exmouth and Exeter East constituency is located in Devon. It covers the eastern suburbs of the city of Exeter (Pinhoe, St Loyes and Topsham) and the towns of Exmouth, Cranbrook and Budleigh Salterton. Exmouth and Budleigh Salterton are seaside resort towns, and Cranbrook is a new town which began development in 2011 and continues to grow. The constituency contains the headquarters of the Met Office, the United Kingdom's national weather and climate service. The office is located on the eastern side of Exeter and is an important local employer. It also contains Commando Training Centre Royal Marines near Lympstone. The constituency has low levels of deprivation and house prices are above the national average.

In general, residents of the constituency are older and have average levels of education, income and professional employment compared to the rest of the country. White people made up 96% of the population at the 2021 census. At the local council level, most of the constituency is represented by Liberal Democrats, with some Conservatives elected in Exmouth, Labour Party and Reform UK councillors in the Exeter suburbs and Greens around Cranbrook. An estimated 53% of voters in the constituency supported leaving the European Union in the 2016 referendum, similar to the nationwide figure.

== Boundaries ==
The constituency was created in the 2023 Periodic Review of Westminster constituencies and is composed of the following wards:

- The District of East Devon wards of Broadclyst, Budleigh & Raleigh, Clyst Valley, Cranbrook, Exe Valley, Exmouth Brixington, Exmouth Halsdon, Exmouth Littleham, Exmouth Town, Exmouth Withycombe Raleigh, Whimple & Rockbeare, and Woodbury & Lympstone.
- The City of Exeter wards of Pinhoe, St Loyes, and Topsham.

It comprises the following:

- Approximately three quarters of the abolished East Devon constituency, including the towns of Budleigh Salterton, Cranbrook, Exmouth and Topsham, and the surrounding rural areas
- The City of Exeter suburb of Pinhoe from Exeter
- The Exe Valley ward from Central Devon.

== Elections ==
=== Elections in the 2020s ===
General election 2024: Exmouth and Exeter East
Party	Candidate	Votes	%	±%
Conservative	David Reed	14,728	28.7	−21.1
Labour	Helen Dallimore	14,607	28.5	+18.0
Liberal Democrats	Paul Arnott	11,387	22.2	+19.2
Reform	Garry Sutherland	7,085	13.8	+13.5
Green	Olly Davey	2,331	4.5	+2.8
Independent	Dan Wilson	590	1.1	N/A
Independent	Peter Faithfull	454	0.9	+0.4
Climate	Mark Baldwin	134	0.3	N/A
Majority		121	0.2	−15.6
Turnout		51,478	64.4	−10.5
Registered electors		79,983		
Conservative hold		Swing	−19.6	

=== 2019 notional result ===
2019 notional result
Party	Vote	%
Conservative	27,828	49.8
Others	19,294	34.4
Labour	5,878	10.5
Liberal Democrats	1,691	3.0
Green	970	1.7
Brexit Party	171	0.3
Turnout	55,832	74.9
Electorate	74,502	
