= Axminster railway station =

Railway station in Devon, England

Axminster
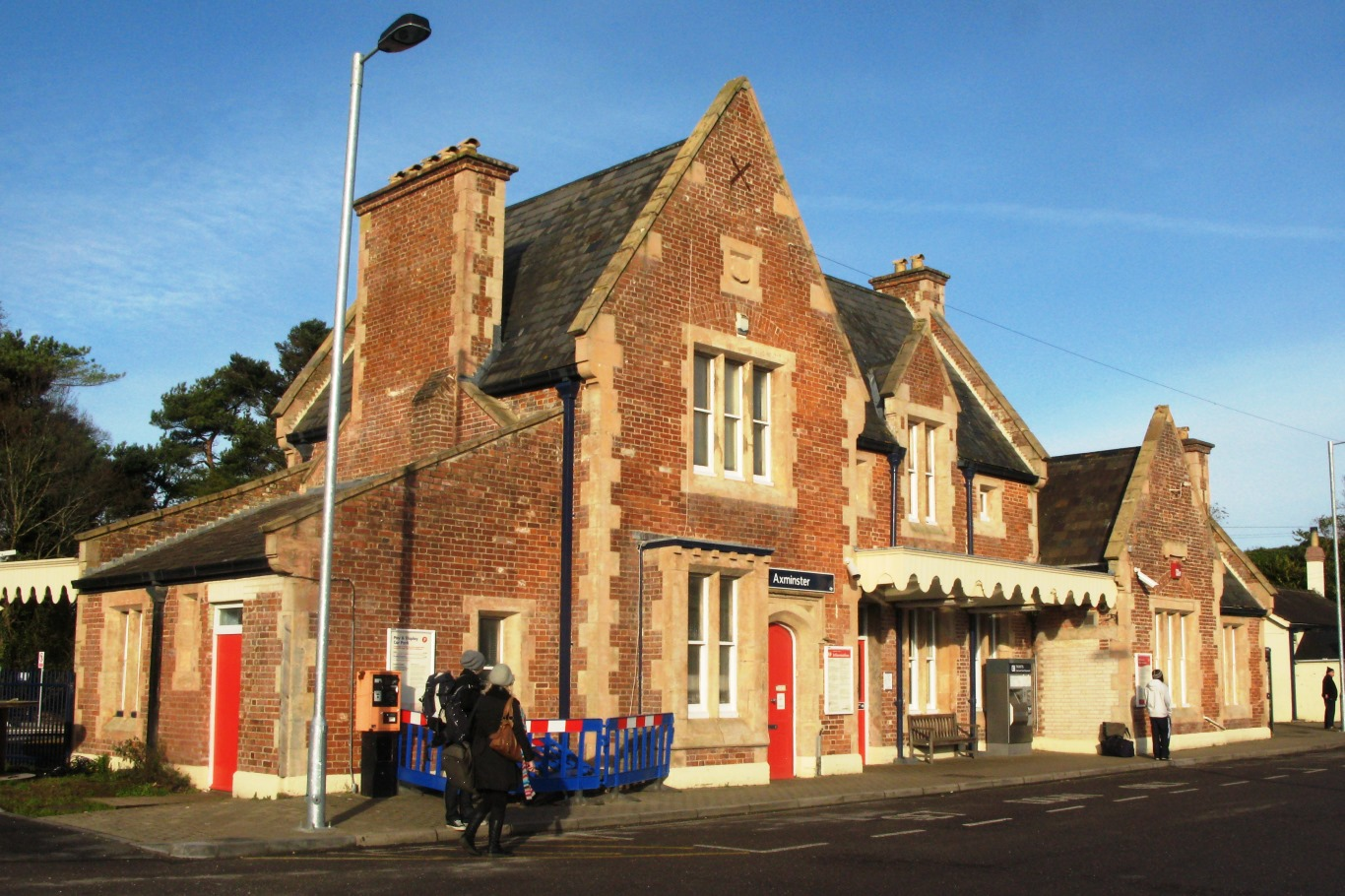

General information
- Location: Axminster, Devon; England
- Coordinates: 50.779°N 3.005°W
- Grid reference: SY292982
- Manager: South Western Railway
- Platforms: 2

Other information
- Station code: AXM
- Classification: DfT category D

History
- Original company: London and South Western Railway
- Post-grouping: Southern Railway

Key dates
- 19 July 1860: Opened
- 1903: Lyme Regis branch opened
- 1965: Lyme Regis branch closed
- 1967: Line singled
- 2009: Second platform reopened

Passengers
- 2020/21: ▼0.142 million
- 2021/22: ▲0.304 million
- 2022/23: ▲0.366 million
- 2023/24: ▲0.380 million
- 2024/25: ▲0.418 million
Location
Notes
- Passenger statistics from the Office of Rail and Road

Axminster railway station serves the town of Axminster in Devon, England. It is operated by South Western Railway. It is on the West of England Line, 144 miles 48 chains (232.7 km; 144.60 mi) from London Waterloo, between Crewkerne and Honiton.

The station was opened by the London and South Western Railway in 1860. The main station building was designed by William Tite.

== History ==
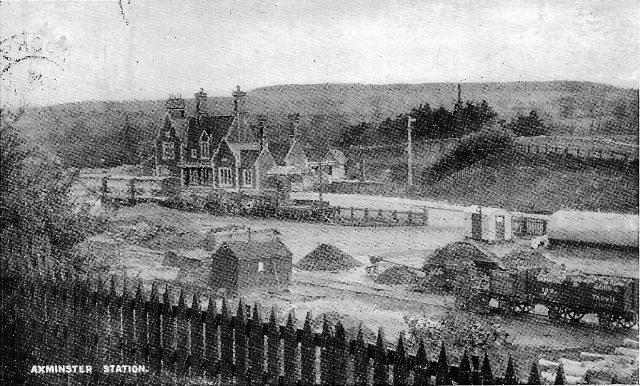
The station in the early years of the twentieth century.

The first proposal for a railway to Axminster came in 1852 when a Devon and Dorset Railway was promoted jointly by the Great Western Railway and Bristol and Exeter Railway. This would have linked Dorchester with Exeter, running close to Bridport then through Axminster and Honiton. This caused the London and South Western Railway (LSWR) to make a binding commitment to parliament in 1853 that they would build a more direct route from Salisbury to Exeter. Parliament agreed to the LSWR's plan rather than the Devon and Dorset scheme. The LSWR did not immediately start to build their route but parliament forced them to honour their commitment in 1855 and so they obtained the London and South Western Railway (Exeter Extension) Act 1856 and the line between Yeovil Junction and Exeter Queen Street, including the station at Axminster, opened on 19 July 1860.

The main building was on the westbound platform. It was designed by the LSWR's architect William Tite. A goods yard was located opposite the station building with a goods shed. A small locomotive shed was soon added at the Exeter end of the goods yard where a locomotive was kept to help heavy trains up the gradient towards Honiton. A signal box was provided at the south end of the westbound platform.

In 1903 Axminster became a junction when the Lyme Regis branch line was opened. The platform for this was on the north side of the station but Lyme Regis is to the south. This resulted in a steep climb of 1 in 180 to cross the main line on a girder bridge. There was also a connection into the goods yard on the south side of the station but this was removed on 5 September 1915. The Lyme Regis line necesitated the demolition of the locomotive shed.

The platforms on the main line were lengthened beyond the road bridge in the 1930s to accommodate longer trains.

The Lyme Regis branch line was closed on 29 November 1965. The goods yard was closed on 18 April 1966. On The main line was reduced to a single track on 5 March 1967 so the signal box was closed and all trains used the former westbound platform. This left Axminster in the middle of a 15.26 mi (24.56 km) single-track section between Chard Junction and Honiton.

The West of England Line became of British Rail's Network SouthEast sector when it was created in 1986. During the 1980s the platform was again extended. This time it was southwards to allow the north end to be closed so that passengers no longer needed to pass beneath the narrow arch of the road bridge.

Work started February 2009 on a £20 million project which included building a new platform to replace the disused eastbound platform. This required the installion a new footbridge, lifts and waiting shelter. This was served by a new 3 mi (4.8 km) passing loop which included strengthening seven bridges and 20 culverts, installing 12 new signals, replacing three miles of signal cables, and modernising the signalling panel at Chard Junction. The work was completed in December 2009.

== Facilities ==
The station is in the Station Yard off Trafalgar Way. It has a ticket office and ticket machine, toilets, and sheltered waiting areas. There is a car park, bike storage and bus stop. There is step-free access to both platforms. A former parcels office to the east of the main building has been converted for use as a café.

== Passenger volume ==
Passengers starting or finishing their journeys at Axminster have exceeded 300,000 every year since 2012 except during 2020 when there were travel restrictions during the COVID-19 pandemic. In the reporting year 2024–2025 they exceeded 400,000 for the first time.

Passengers by year
Year (Note: The passenger data covers twelve month periods that start in April.)	Entries and exits
2004–2005	181,586
2005–2006	176,270
2006–2007	181,825
2007–2008	205,870
2008–2009	213,590
2009–2010	211,204
2010–2011	252,662
2011–2012	279,604
2012–2013	345,560
2013–2014	355,710
2014–2015	386,226
2015–2016	394,438
2016–2017	395,216
2017–2018	399,084
2018–2019	384,220
2019–2020	377,688
2020–2021	141,960
2021–2022	303,842
2022–2023	366,450
2023–2024	379,754
2024–2025	417,946

== Services ==
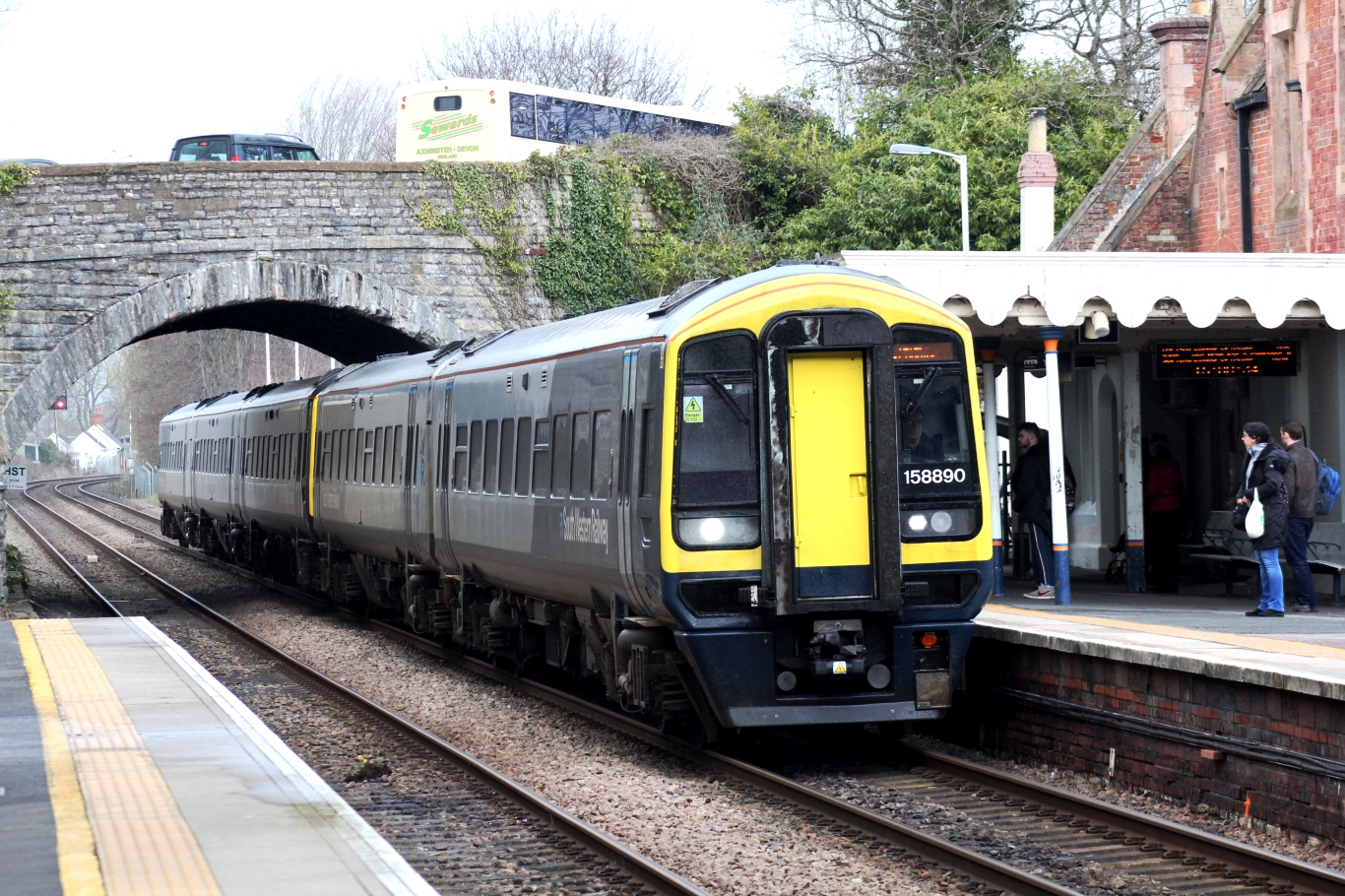
A South Western Railway train arriving from London Waterloo

Axminster is served by one South Western Railway train per hour in each direction on the route between London Waterloo and Exeter St Davids. There is also a single Great Western Railway service from Barnstaple which terminates at Axminster each evening Monday to Friday.

Preceding station	National Rail	Following station
Honiton	South Western Railway (West of England Line)	Crewkerne
Honiton	Great Western Railway (West of England Line); Limited service	Terminus
	Disused railways	
Combpyne	British Rail (WR) (Lyme Regis branch line)	Terminus

== See also ==
- Southern Railway routes west of Salisbury

== Bibliography ==
- Quick, Michael (2023). Railway Passenger Stations in Great Britain: A Chronology (PDF) (5th ed.). London: Railway and Canal Historical Society.
