= West of England line =

British railway line

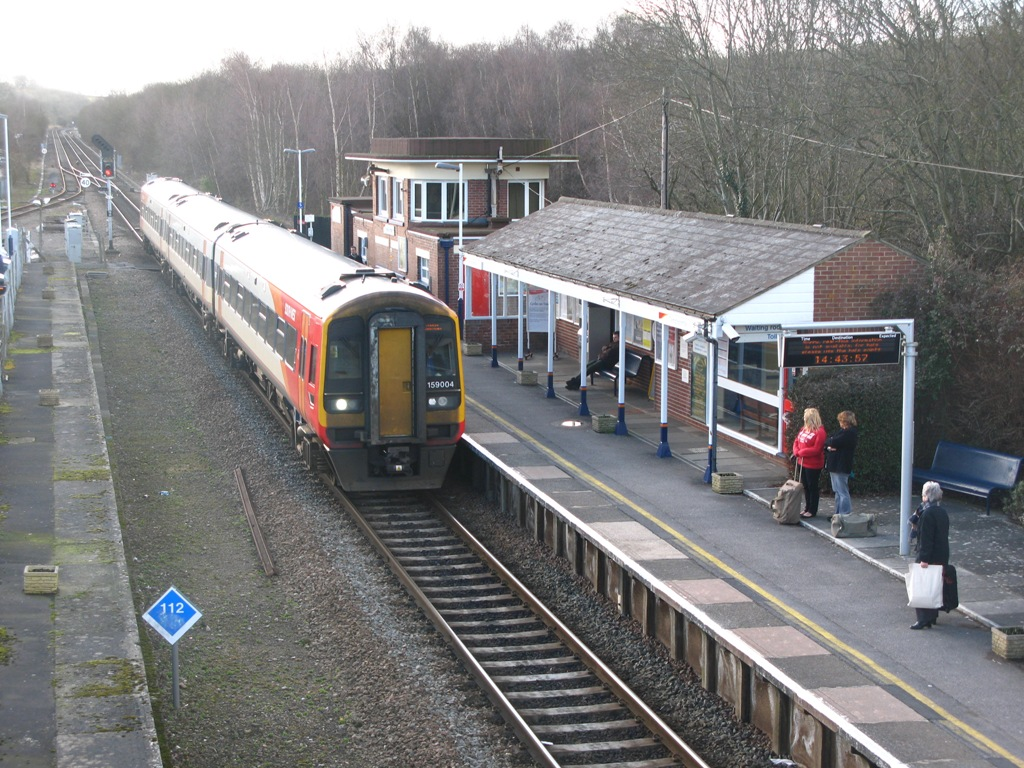
- Templecombe station in February 2010

Overview
- Status: Operational
- Owner: Network Rail
- Termini: Basingstoke; Exeter St Davids
- Stations: 21 (Basingstoke to Exeter St Davids)

Service
- Type: Suburban rail, Heavy rail
- System: National Rail
- Operator: South Western Railway
- Depot: Salisbury TMD
- Rolling stock: Class 158 "Express Sprinter"; Class 159 "South Western Turbo"

Technical
- Line length: 120 mi 77 ch (194.67 km) [Basingstoke to Exeter St Davids] 172 mi 12 ch (277.05 km) [London to Exeter St Davids via SWML]
- Number of tracks: 2 (Basingstoke–Salisbury); 1 (Salisbury–Pinhoe); 2 (Pinhoe–Exeter St Davids)
- Track gauge: 1,435 mm (4 ft 8 1/2 in) standard gauge
- Operating speed: 90 mph (140 km/h) maximum
Route map
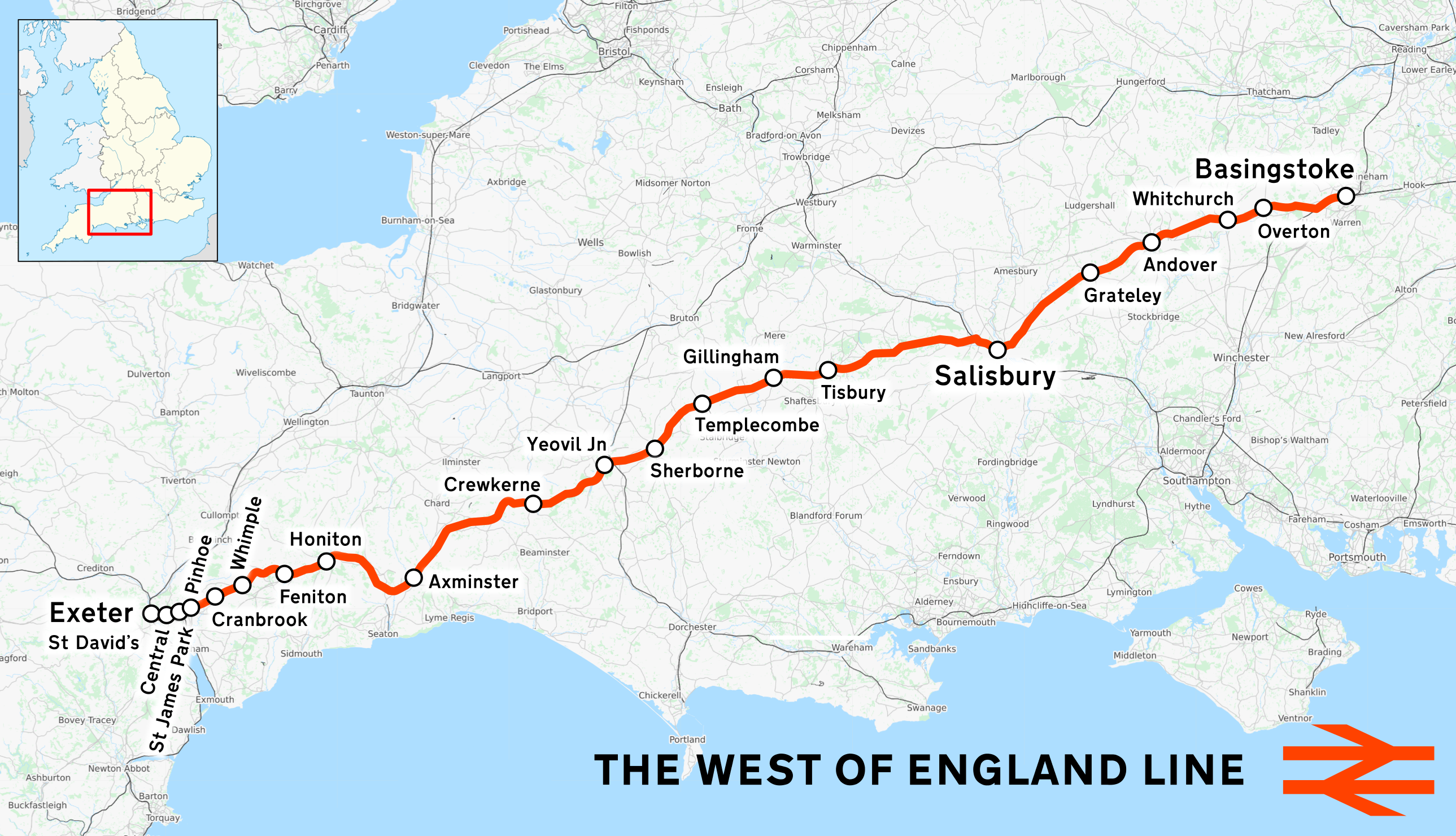
(Click to expand)

The West of England line (also known as the West of England Main Line) is a railway line from Basingstoke, Hampshire, to Exeter St Davids in Devon, England. Passenger services run between London Waterloo station and Exeter via the South West Main Line; the line intersects with the Wessex Main Line at Salisbury.

The line was constructed by the London and South Western Railway (L&SWR) and the Salisbury and Yeovil Railway between 1854 and 1860, with the L&SWR eventually gaining full operation. Although it was once a significant connection from London to Southwest England, it has declined in importance since the years following the 1963 Beeching Report. Exeter can be reached more quickly from London Paddington via the Reading–Taunton line, with this route providing the only direct route to destinations west of Exeter since 2009. However, the West of England line is still important as a freight and diversionary route.

== Route ==
Trains between London Waterloo and Exeter run on the South West Main Line as far as Basingstoke. The West of England Line diverges at Worting Junction, a short distance west. North of Worting Junction, stopping services from London Waterloo and CrossCountry services to the North of England via Reading use the outer pair of tracks, while Waterloo express services use the inner pair of tracks. The inner pair of tracks are unelectrified through the junction and continue west to Salisbury and Exeter.

Beyond Worting Junction, the route heads westwards to Salisbury and connects to the Wessex Main Line, then over the Heart of Wessex Line without a junction just before Yeovil Junction. There is a connection to the Avocet Line just before Exeter. The line passes through Exeter Central before ending at Exeter St Davids. Overall, it passes through five counties – Hampshire, Wiltshire, Dorset, Somerset and Devon.

Network Rail splits the line into two sections: the first section from the line's start at Worting Junction to Wilton Junction (near Salisbury) is classified as "London & SE commuter", while the rest is a "secondary" route. The secondary route west of Salisbury is predominantly single track, but has three sections of double track and four passing loops. The double track sections and passing loops are: a loop just outside Tisbury, a loop at Gillingham, double track from Templecombe to Yeovil Junction, a loop at the former Chard Junction station, 3 miles of double track centred on Axminster, a loop at Honiton station, and double track from Pinhoe to Exeter.

The line has a similar route to the parallel A303 road, which runs from Basingstoke to Honiton.

The line's speed limit is mainly at 80 miles per hour (130 km/h) or above over its whole length from Basingstoke to Exeter. Speed is further limited around the junctions. The first section to Wilton Junction has a listed line speed of 50–90 mph, and the secondary section to Exeter has a line speed of mainly 85 mph with parts at 70 mph.

There are two depots on the line operated by the South Western Railway. The traincare depot is at Salisbury, while the traincrew depot is at Yeovil Junction.

== History ==
=== Construction ===
The line was constructed in stages completed between 1854 and 1860, and eventually was wholly operated by the London and South Western Railway (L&SWR). There had been plans to construct a direct line from London to Exeter since the beginning of railways. Although the Great Western Railway (GWR) were the first to construct a line to Exeter in 1844, this went via Bristol. The L&SWR had opened a line to Salisbury on 1 March 1847, which ran via Southampton. They had agreed with the Southampton and Dorchester Railway that they would not construct any lines west of Salisbury or Dorchester, but changed their stance following the opening of the GWR route. The section from Basingstoke to Andover opened on 3 July 1854, followed by an extension to Salisbury on 1 May 1857.

The section from Salisbury to Yeovil was originally constructed by the Salisbury and Yeovil Railway. The first section to open was Salisbury to Gillingham on 2 May 1859, followed by extensions to Sherborne on 7 May 1860, Yeovil Junction on 1 June, and Exeter Central on 19 July. To allow an easy transfer at Salisbury, the original station at Milford was closed and rerouted to its current site at Fisherton at the same time as the Gillingham extension. The section from Yeovil to Exeter involved a lengthy tunnel near Honiton, constructed from 11 million bricks. The tunnel has since been closed on occasion because of drainage problems owing to nearby natural springs. A branch to Yeovil Town, connecting with the GWR services, opened on 11 September 1866. A further extension of the mainline to Exeter St Davids opened on 1 February 1862.

=== Early history ===
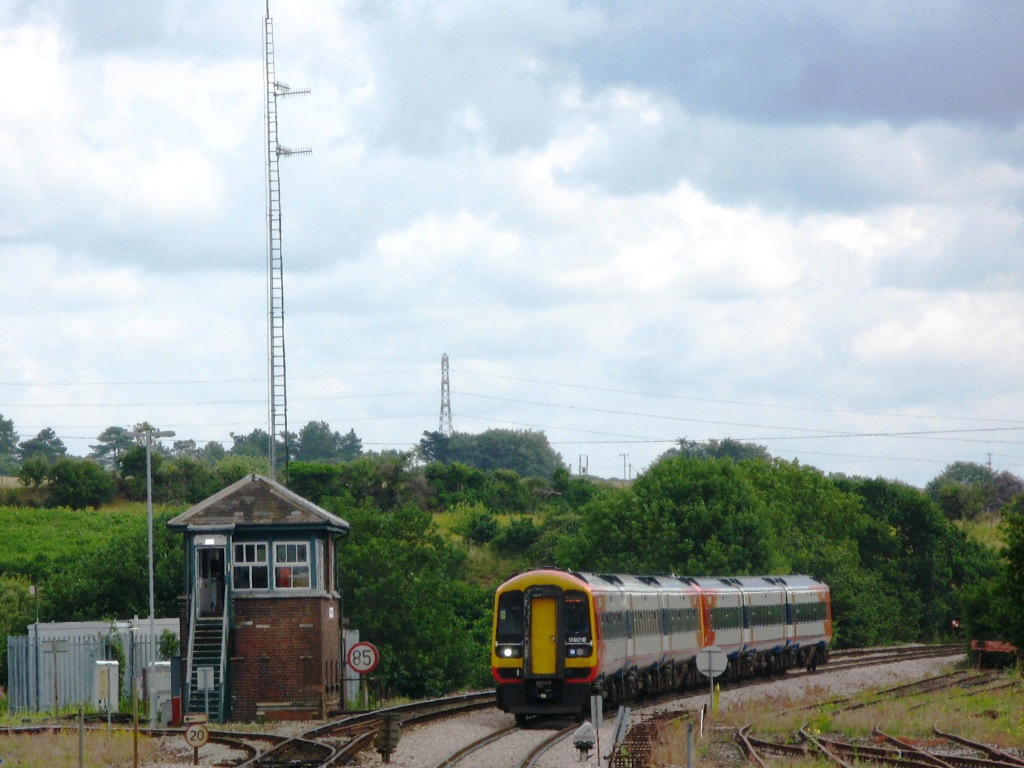
Yeovil Junction

The line was upgraded from single to double track in stages during the 1860s; most bridges had been built to accommodate two tracks. This work was complete by 1 July 1870. Further branch lines opened to Exmouth on 1 May 1861, Chard on 11 September 1866, Seaton on 16 March 1868, Sidmouth on 6 July 1874, and Lyme Regis on 24 August 1903.

Worting Junction was originally constructed as a flat junction which required that down trains for the West of England line and up trains from Southampton crossed each other's paths. This was not a great concern at first, but as traffic and speeds increased the junction became a bottleneck. To relieve this, a flying junction was provided to the south, opening on 30 May 1897. This changed the arrangement so that up trains from the Southampton line now crossed over the up and down Salisbury lines on Battledown Flyover, west of Basingstoke.

A rail motor service was introduced between Exeter and Honiton in 1906, but was soon cancelled. The Amesbury and Military Camp Light Railway branch from Grateley opened on 1 June 1906.

The GWR line from Chippenham and Bristol Temple Meads via Westbury had its own terminus at Salisbury from where the L&SWR continued the route southeast towards Southampton. The two stations were amalgamated on 12 September 1932 when passenger trains were diverted into the Southern Railway station. This route is known now as the Wessex Main Line.

Following nationalisation in 1948, the line initially saw heavy investment from British Railways, with services including the Atlantic Express service from Waterloo to various points past Exeter, and a regular service from Brighton to Plymouth. The line speed past Salisbury was increased to 85 miles per hour (137 km/h) in 1949.

=== Later history ===
The section west of Salisbury was transferred from the Southern Region of British Railways to the Western Region in 1963, which led it into direct comparisons with the Paddington–Taunton–Exeter service and concerns over its viability. The Beeching Report of 1963 identified duplication of routes from London to the West Country, and concluded the West of England line was secondary, as it carried 20% of the overall traffic between London and Exeter compared to the route via Paddington and the Reading–Taunton line. Additionally, trains from Paddington did not have to reverse at Exeter St Davids to continue into Devon and Cornwall.

A complete closure west of Salisbury was rumoured. Instead, the proposal was to reduce long sections west of Salisbury to single track, close minor stations, and reduce services to one train every two hours. To speed up long-distance services, many local stations had services reduced with the threat of closure. All branch lines between Salisbury and Exeter had closed by 1967, including Chard on 10 September 1962, Lyme Regis on 29 November 1965 and Yeovil on 3 October 1966, and all through services beyond Exeter had been withdrawn by 1968. The proposal was modified after concerns about overcrowding, and a 10-mile (16 km) section between Templecombe and Yeovil Junction was retained as double track. A passing loop at Tisbury opened on 24 March 1986.

The line has never been electrified, and consequently all rolling stock was steam and now diesel. Pinhoe station re-opened in 1982, followed by Templecombe a year later. By the 1980s, the line was clearly in decline, with limited traffic and unsatisfactory locomotive stock. However, services began to improve after the introduction of British Rail Class 159s in 1992-93. Through services began running beyond Exeter again in 1992, and continued until 2009. Additional Class 159s and Class 158s were introduced from 2006, having previously been used on the TransPennine Express route.

The 2006 Network Rail South West Main Line Route Utilisation Strategy recommended building additional sections of double track so the timetable could be improved, however Network Rail's 2008 Route Plan did not mention this. An additional passing loop was constructed at Axminster in 2009, allowing hourly services to run between Waterloo and Exeter St David's.

== Current operations ==
=== Passengers ===
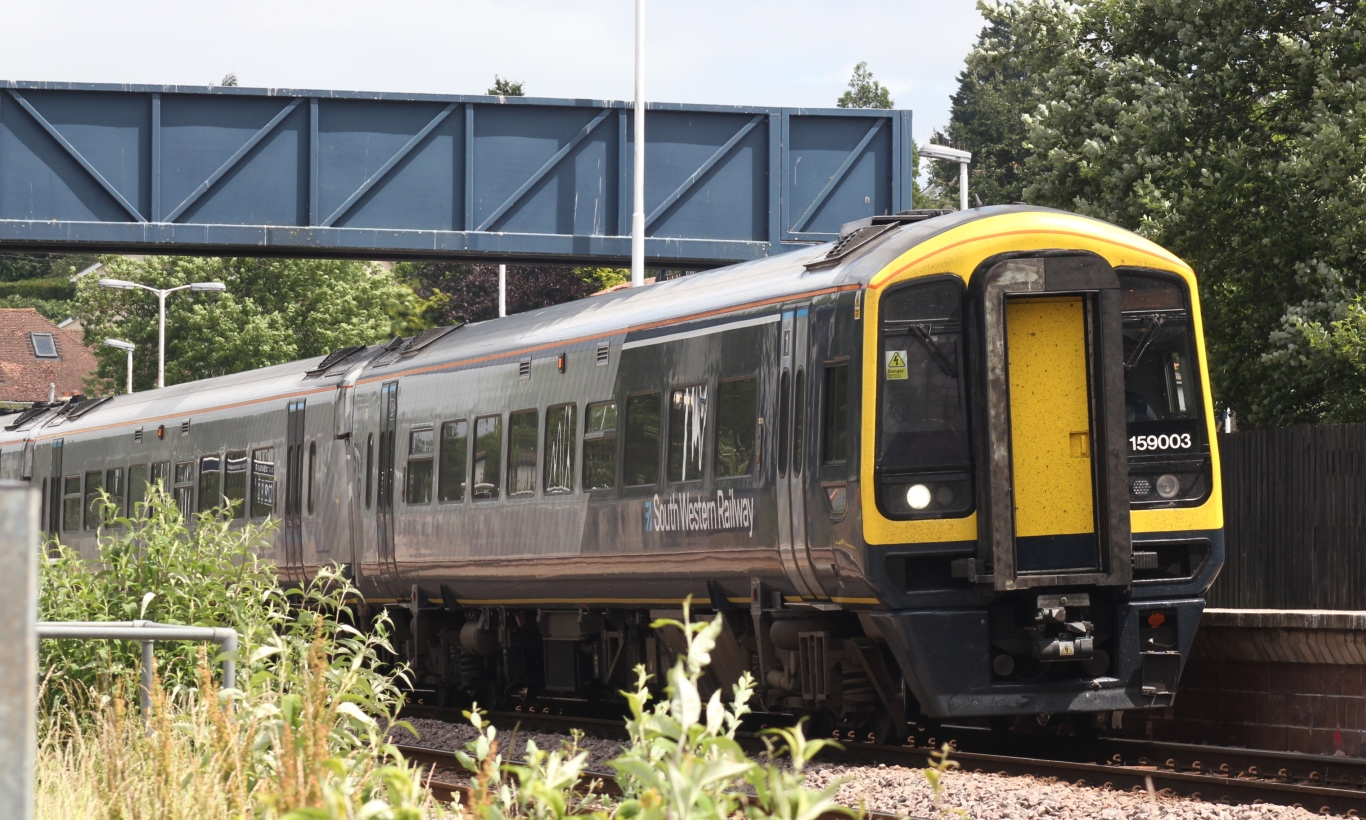
A Class 159 at Honiton

Passenger services are operated by South Western Railway using Class 158 and Class 159 trains. There are generally two trains each hour between London Waterloo and Salisbury, one of which continues to and from Exeter St Davids. A few Salisbury services continue to and from Yeovil Junction. Journey time between London and Exeter is under 3 hours and 30 minutes; between London and Salisbury takes about 1 hour 30 minutes.

=== Freight ===
There is a freight branch line to the Ministry of Defence site at Ludgershall. Other freight from Southampton Docks is sometimes routed over the eastern part of this route when the South Western Main Line through Winchester is closed.

The line carried a significant amount of milk from Chard until March 1980.

== Future ==
There have been proposals to electrify the line. In 2025, train operator South Western Railway estimated that their Class 159 and 158s would reach the end of their life by 2030. As an alternative to replacement by diesels or electrification, a proposal has been made for battery-operated trains with intermittent third rail charging points.

Local residents have campaigned to reopen a station at Chard. Network Rail investigated the feasibility of a new station in 2023.

Following the 2024 general election, the incoming Labour government cancelled the A303 Stonehenge road tunnel; study group Greengauge 21 recommended improving the West of England line instead. The single track sections have particularly affected growth to the east of Exeter, and re-dualling the track between there and Axminster would allow a Devon Metro service to operate, with more frequent short-distance trains. In reply to a written question in Parliament in May 2025, Lilian Greenwood, the Parliamentary Under-Secretary of State for Transport, responded that there were no plans to improve the West of England line at that time.

== See also ==
- Exeter to Plymouth railway of the LSWR
- Rail services in the West of England
- Southern Railway routes west of Salisbury

== Bibliography ==
- "Route Plan C Wessex" (PDF). Network Rail. March 2010. Archived from the original (PDF) on 2 April 2015.
- Network Rail (2020). "West of England Line Study 2020" (PDF). Line Study. Archived from the original (PDF) on 31 January 2021.
- White, H.P. (1982) [1961]. Thomas, David St John; Patmore, J. Allan (eds.). A Regional History of the Railways of Great Britain, volume 2: Southern England. David & Charles. ISBN 978-0-715-34733-1.
- Thomas, David St John (1981). A Regional History of the Railways of Great Britain, volume 1: The West Country. David & Charles. ISBN 978-0-715-38210-3.
- Maggs, Colin (2017). A History of the Southern Railway. Amberley. ISBN 978-1-445-65272-6.
- Reed, David (2022). Trains in the Southern Region: The Late 1960s and 1970s. Amberley. ISBN 978-1-398-11016-8.
- R.V.J. Butt (1995). The Directory of Railway Stations. Sparkford: Patrick Stephens. ISBN 9781852605087.
- Fiennes, Gerard (1967). I Tried to Run a Railway (Revised ed.). United Kingdom: Ian Allan Ltd. ISBN 978-1-786-69128-6.
- Quick, Michael (2000). Railway Passenger Stations in Great Britain : A chronology (PDF). Railway and Canal Historical Society. Archived from the original (PDF) on 4 July 2021.
- J.H. Lucking (1968). Railways of Dorset: an outline of their establishment, development and progress from 1825. Lichfield: Railway Correspondence and Travel Society. OCLC 31916.
