= Exeter St Davids railway station =

Railway station in Exeter, Devon, England

Exeter St Davids
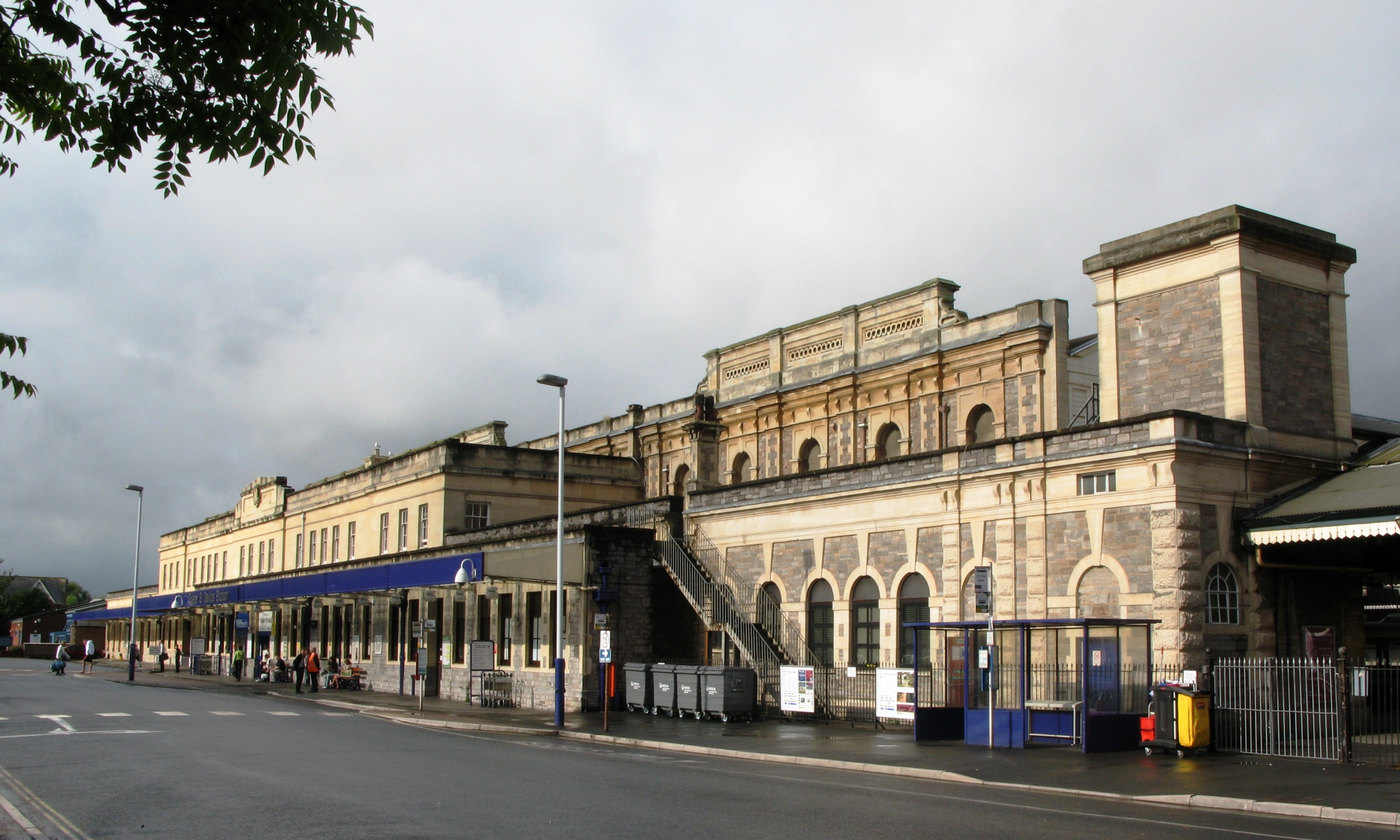

General information
- Location: Exeter, Devon; England
- Coordinates: 50.7296°N 3.5435°W
- Grid reference: SX911933
- Manager: Great Western Railway
- Platforms: 6

Other information
- Station code: EXD
- Classification: DfT category C1

History
- Original company: Bristol and Exeter Railway
- Pre-grouping: Great Western Railway
- Post-grouping: Great Western Railway

Key dates
- 1844: Opened
- 1864: Rebuilt for LSWR
- 1913: Rebuilt without roof

Passengers
- 2021–2022: ▲2.207 million
- Interchange: ▲0.888 million
- 2022–2023: ▲2.617 million
- Interchange: ▲1.226 million
- 2023–2024: ▲2.722 million
- Interchange: ▲1.352 million
- 2024–2025: ▲2.922 million
- Interchange: ▲1.525 million
- 2025–2026: ▲3.016 million
- Interchange: ▲1.601 million
Location

Exeter St Davids railway station is the largest and busiest railway station in Exeter, although it is not as convenient for the city centre as Exeter Central railway station. About 3,000,000 people start or finish their journeys at the station each year, and more than 1,500,000 change trains here.

It is 193 miles 72 chains (193.90 mi; 312.1 km) from London Paddington, from where trains travel through Exeter to Plymouth and Penzance. The station is also served by trains from London Waterloo via Salisbury and long distance services to Bristol Temple Meads, Birmingham New Street and places in northern England and Scotland such as Glasgow Central. Local services operate on routes to Exmouth, Paignton, Barnstaple and Okehampton.

It was opened in 1844 by the Bristol and Exeter Railway and the other routes were completed by 1862 when the line from London Waterloo was complete, although these trains pass through St Davids in the opposite direction to those from London Paddington. It has had major rebuilding work in the 1860s and 1910s. It is now managed by Great Western Railway and served by trains operated by them, South Western Railway and CrossCountry.

It is credited with being the place where inspiration happened for the creation of Penguin Books which were designed for the needs of railway passengers.

== History ==
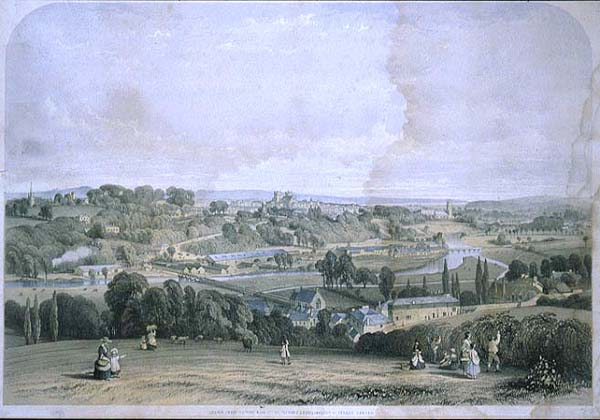
Exeter in 1844. A print by William Spreat showing St Davids in 1844.

The station was opened on 1 May 1844 by the Bristol and Exeter Railway (B&ER). The station was designed by Isambard Kingdom Brunel and was one of his single-sided stations which meant that the two platforms were both on the eastern side of the line. This side is nearer the city and so very convenient for passengers travelling into Exeter, but did mean that many trains had to cross in front of others.

This was not a significant issue while the station was at the end of the line, but on 30 May 1846 the South Devon Railway (SDR) opened a line westwards towards Plymouth. A carriage shed was built for the SDR at the south end of the B&ER platform but the goods sheds and locomotive sheds for both companies were to the west, between the station and the River Exe. The SDR was designed to be worked by atmospheric power and an engine house was built on the banks of the river near the locomotive shed. This was only used for pumping the atmospheric pipes for about a year but was not demolished until the 1970s.

The next railway to arrive at St Davids was the Exeter and Crediton Railway on 12 May 1851, the junction of which is to the north of the station at Cowley Bridge Junction. This line was worked by the B&ER and trains were accommodated at the existing platforms. All these railways were built to the 7 ft (2,134 mm) broad gauge, but on 1 February 1862, the 4 ft 8 1/2 in (1,435 mm) gauge London and South Western Railway (LSWR) brought a line into the station from their own Queen Street station in the city centre. The LSWR owned the Exeter and Crediton Railway and started to work the line for itself, although the broad gauge was retained for the B&ER to work goods trains to Crediton.

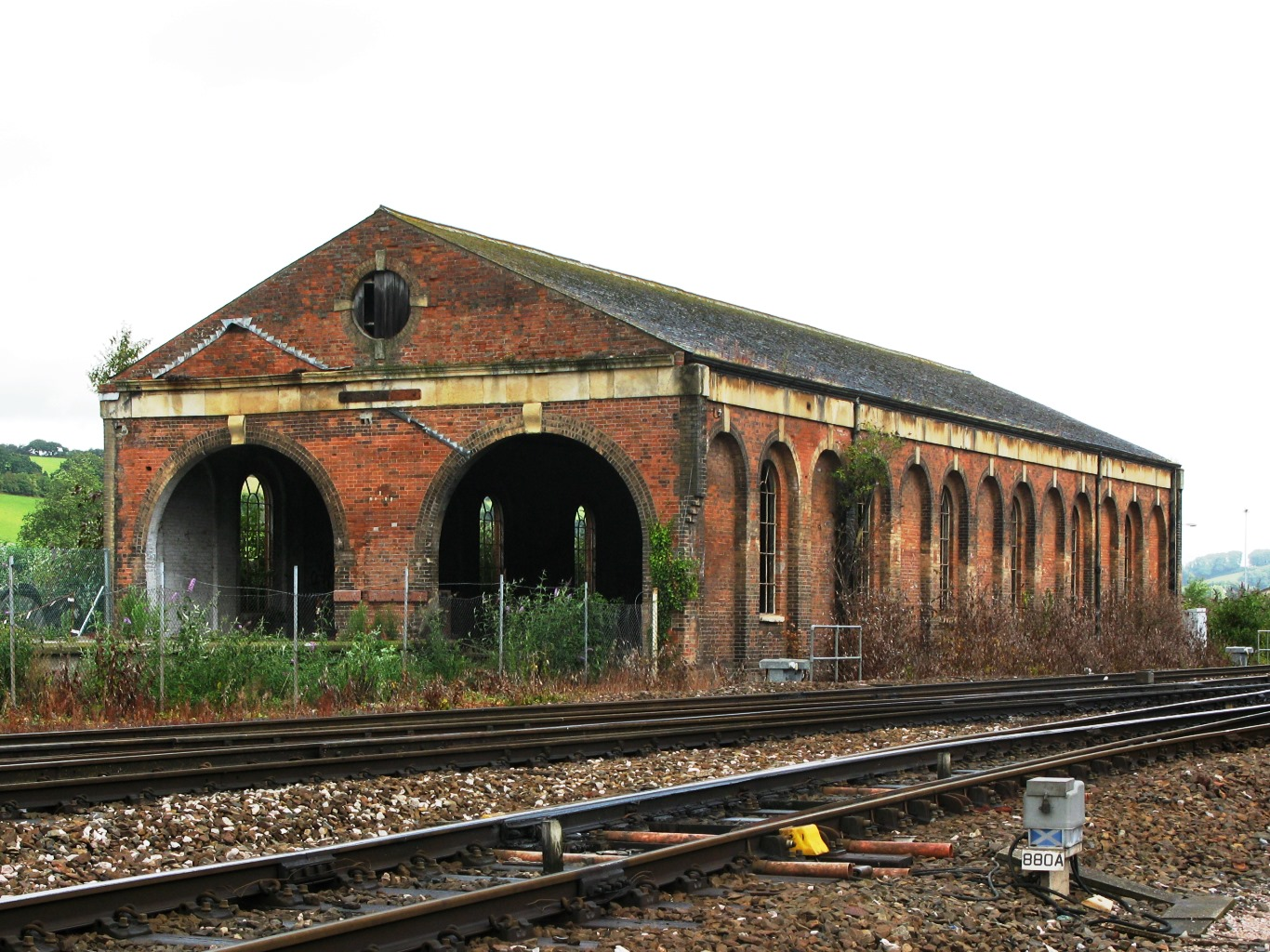
The transfer shed built in the 1860s

With two gauges and four companies using the single-sided station, it was in need of remodelling. A new double-sided platform opened on the western side of the line and the original up platform at the northern end was closed. The original platforms had all been constructed with individual train sheds covering the tracks, and the opportunity was taken to replace these with one large train shed across all the main tracks and platforms. North of the station was the Red Cow level crossing and just beyond this an additional goods shed was constructed. Unlike the earlier ones, it was solely for transferring goods between the trains of the two different gauges. These buildings were all designed by Francis Fox, the B&ER engineer, and Henry Lloyd and the work was completed in 1864. The old transfer shed is now a Grade II listed building.

The B&ER was amalgamated with the Great Western Railway on 1 January 1876, as was the SDR a month later. The main line from Bristol was rebuilt with mixed gauge track that allowed broad gauge trains to continue running through from London Paddington to Penzance, while at the same time offering a standard gauge track for local trains from Bristol Temple Meads; the mixed gauge line was ready by 1 March 1876.

The train shed was removed in 1912-13 and the platforms extended northwards towards the level crossing. A second island platform was provided on the west side and this entailed the goods shed being narrowed from two tracks to one at their southern end. The middle island platform was mainly used for LSWR trains while "down" GWR services towards the West Country used the original main platform and the new island platforms. Before Southern Region services to Plymouth were abandoned, passengers could see Plymouth-bound services of the Western Region and Southern Region leaving St Davids in opposite directions. The station has remained largely in this form since, but resignalling works in 1985 saw the ex-LSWR services moved to the main platform so that down ex-GWR line services did not have to cross their path at the south end of the station. A through-line between platforms 1 and 3 was removed at the same time. The new signal box was built on the site of the old atmospheric engine house and replaced three older signal boxes.

Remains of the earlier stations can still be seen. The main façade dates from 1864 and the Great Western Hotel dates from the earliest days, as does the southern section of platform 1. The goods shed opposite platform 6 shows the angle where the southern end was cut back in 1912, and at the northern end, part of the original goods shed still stands beneath later extensions.

=== Accidents and incidents ===
An accident occurred on 4 January 2010, when Class 142 number 142029 collided with a train of two Class 159 units waiting at platform 1 to start for London Waterloo. Nine people were injured. The collision happened because the brakes did not slow the Barnstaple train sufficiently due to poor adhesion on the level crossing.

== Description and facilities ==
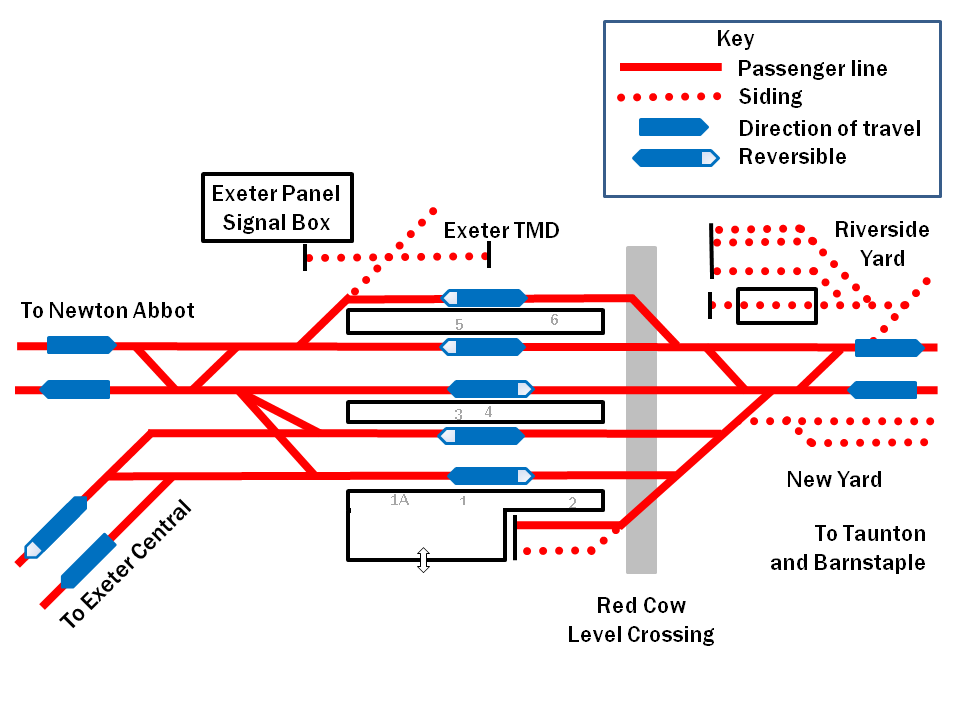
Arrangement of tracks and platforms

The station is on Bonhay Road in Exeter. There is a ticket office and ticket machines, a large car park, cycle storage, toilets, refreshment facilities and shops. All platforms have step-free access. it is at mileage 193 miles 72 chains (193.90 mi; 312.1 km) which is measured from the zero point at London Paddington via Box.

There are six platforms; the station entrance is on platform 1. Five of these are through tracks which can be used by any train approaching and leaving on the main lines north and south of the station (including those on the Tarka Line and Dartmoor Line). The sixth platform is a north-facing single-ended bay platform. Trains on the Exeter Central route can only access platforms 1 and 3. Because of this, trains towards Penzance mostly use platform 4 while platforms 5 and 6 are mostly used by trains towards Taunton, London and the North. All platforms are signalled for trains in either direction.

The main station building, dating from 1862, is 360 ft (110 m) long, built in stone from the Bristol and Exeter Railway's quarry at Westleigh with Bath stone details. The single storey offices are backed by a double height wall which used to support the station roof. The central 170 ft (52 m) section was widened by 11 ft (3.4 m) in 1938, a second storey being added along most of the widened section. The access to the footbridge on platform 1 was also rebuilt at this time and features glazed tiles of Great Western Design design typical of the 1930s. A mural was added in 1992 by local artist Bridget Green which depicts passengers and staff.

At the north end of the platforms is Red Cow level crossing, beyond which is the historic goods transfer shed and the freight facility at Riverside Yard, both on the west side of the line. Opposite these facilities is the 'Waterloo Road' in New Yard which is used by empty passenger trains, especially terminating services from London Waterloo. 1 mi 20 ch (2.0 km; 1.25 mi) north, at the far end of Riverside Yard, is Cowley Bridge Junction where the Tarka and Dartmoor lines diverge.

The junction between the Exeter Central and Penzance routes is at the south end of the platforms. A connection from the Penzance line gives trains access to Exeter TMD where they are maintained.

== Passengers ==
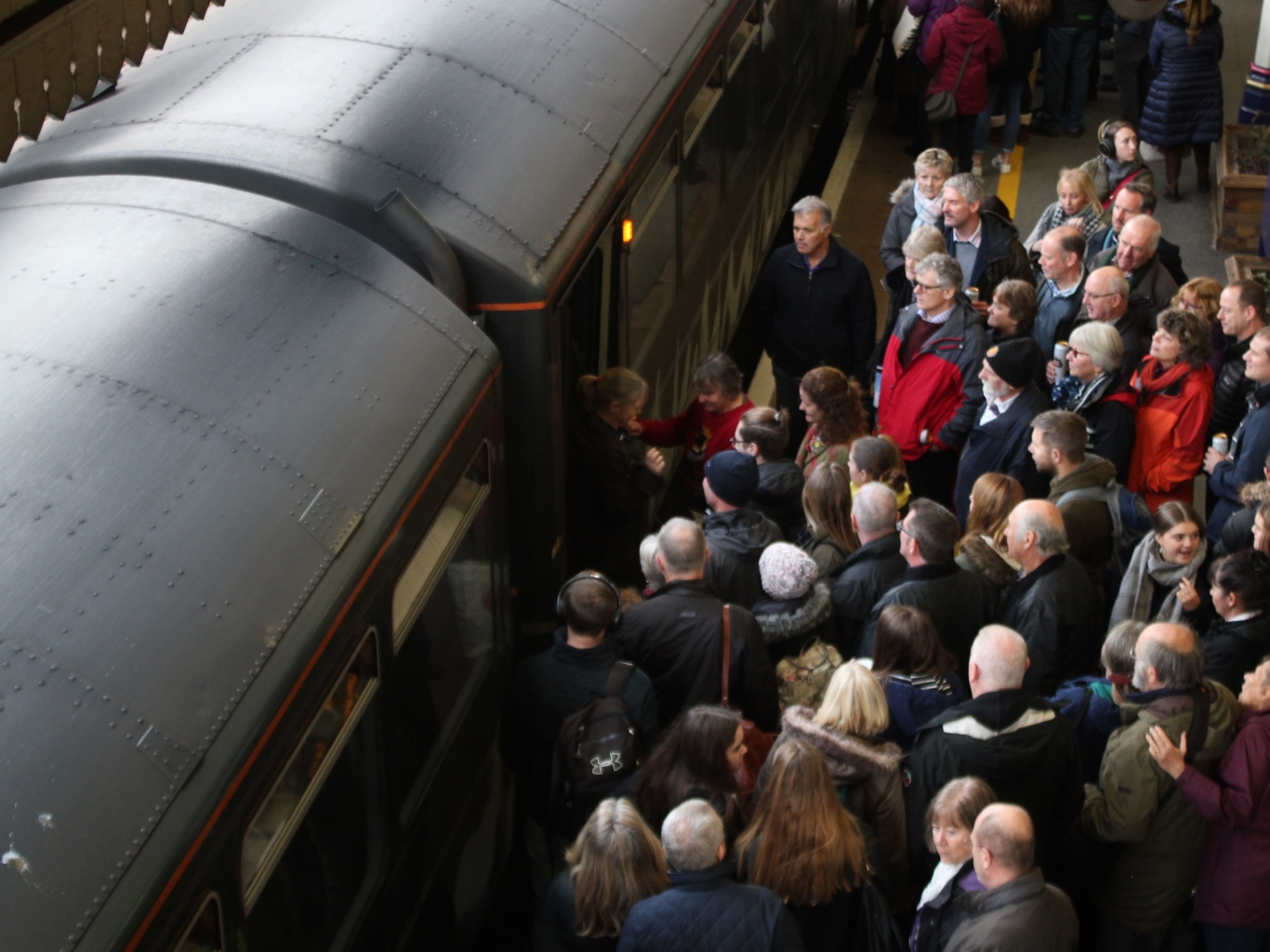
Passengers for an Avocet Line service

Exeter St Davids is the busiest station in Devon with nearly 3,000,000 passengers entering and exiting the station each year along with an estimated 1,500,000 changing trains. (Note: Exeter Central sees more passengers entering and exiting the station than St Davids but has far fewer changing trains.) There has consistently been more than 2,000,000 entries and exits recorded every year since 2008 (except during the COVID-19 pandemic in 2020; passenger volumes exceeded the pre-COVID levels again by 2023.

Passengers by year
| Year (Note: The passenger volume data covers twelve month periods that start in April.) | Entries and exits | Interchanges |
|---|---|---|
| 1997–1998 | 1,382,416 | No data |
| 1998–1999 | 1,409,906 | No data |
| 1999–2000 | 1,510,809 | 522,936 |
| 2000–2001 | 1,449,186 | 487,370 |
| 2001–2002 | 1,473,219 | 468,402 |
| 2002–2003 | 1,529,718 | No data |
| 2003–2004 | No data | No data |
| 2004–2005 | 1,632,285 | 402,464 |
| 2005–2006 | 1,697,428 | 417,684 |
| 2006–2007 | 1,800,833 | 445,833 |
| 2007–2008 | 1,982,428 | 453,764 |
| 2008–2009 | 2,128,584 | 680,797 |
| 2009–2010 | 2,152,786 | 593,759 |
| 2010–2011 | 2,266,050 | 638,146 |
| 2011–2012 | 2,399,394 | 785,336 |
| 2012–2013 | 2,401,276 | 860,485 |
| 2013–2014 | 2,356,204 | 840,575 |
| 2014–2015 | 2,509,220 | 938,817 |
| 2015–2016 | 2,569,104 | 987,193 |
| 2016–2017 | 2,642,898 | 1,012,357 |
| 2017–2018 | 2,605,162 | 1,060,465 |
| 2018–2019 | 2,619,776 | 1,048,626 |
| 2019–2020 | 2,676,464 | 1,063,814 |
| 2020–2021 (Note: Passenger numbers were reduced during 2020 due to the COVID-19 pandemic in the United Kingdom.) | 727,776 | 345,855 |
| 2021–2022 | 2,206,706 | 887,713 |
| 2022–2023 | 2,617,322 | 1,225,850 |
| 2023–2024 | 2,721,596 | 1,351,808 |
| 2024–2025 | 2,922,288 | 1,524,885 |
| 2025–2026 | 3,015,976 | 1,601,120 |

== Services ==
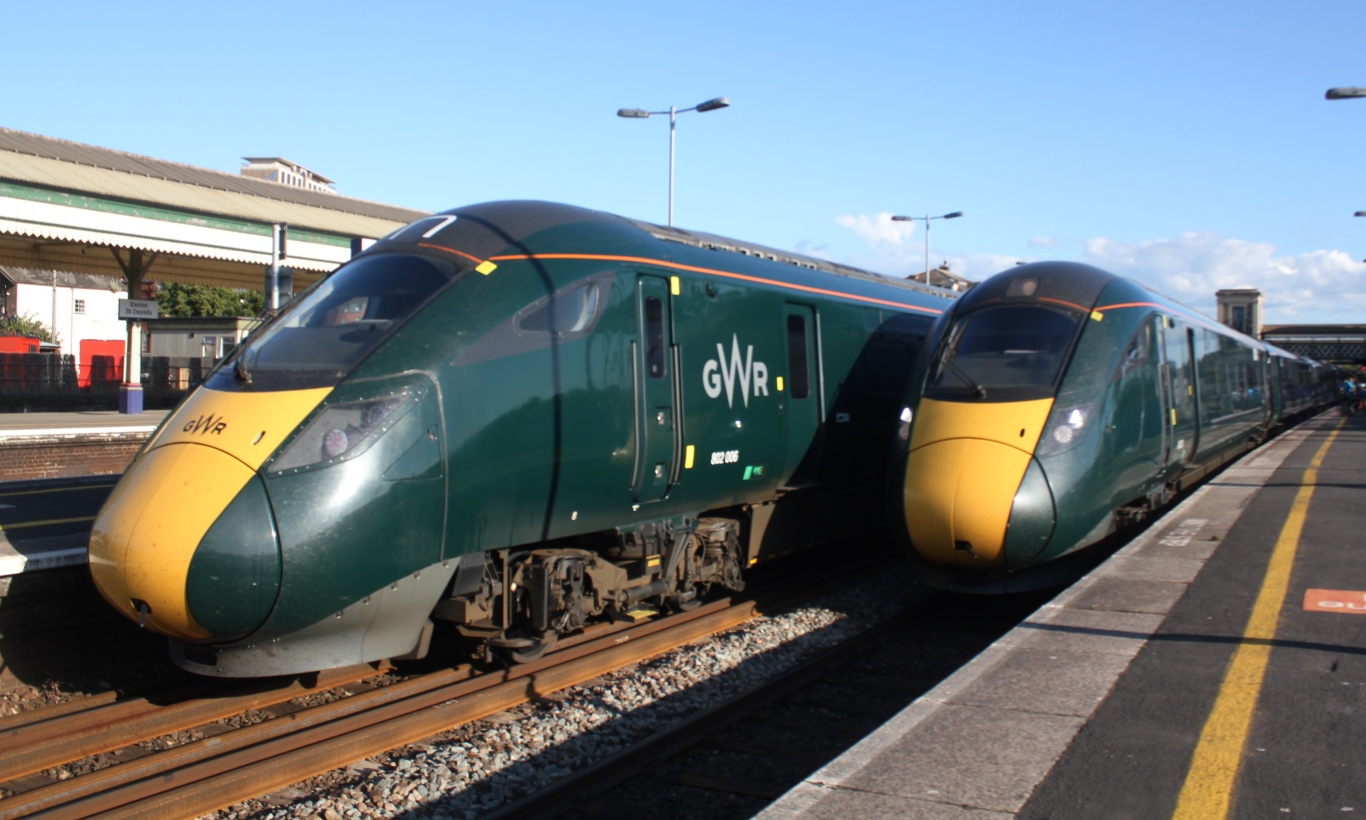
Great Western Railway services to and from London Paddington

Great Western Railway (GWR) operates long distance services through Exeter St Davids on a north–south axis along the old Bristol–Exeter line and South Devon line. The principal services are one or two each hour between London Paddington and Paignton or Plymouth and Penzance (including the Night Riviera sleeping car service). There are also services most hours between Cardiff Central via Bristol Temple Meads and Penzance.

Other long-distance services between Bristol, Plymouth and Penzance are operated hourly by CrossCountry (XC) between to and from stations in Scotland, the North of England and Midlands such as Glasgow Central, Edinburgh Waverley, York and Birmingham New Street. A less frequent XC service operates between Manchester Piccadilly and Paignton.

South Western Railway (SWR) also operates an hourly service between Exeter St Davids and London, but via Axminster and using London Waterloo as its terminus.

Four local routes converge at St Davids: two trains per hour operate on the Avocet Line to and from Exmouth via Exeter Central which work through on the Riviera Line to and from Paignton. The Tarka Line runs between Exeter Central and Barnstaple, sharing the route of the Dartmoor Line between Exeter Central and Crediton before that lines turns towards Okehampton, both having one train per hour during the day. The SWR and GWR services combine to give up to five trains per hour each way between Exeter St Davids and Exeter Central.

| Preceding station | National Rail | Following station |
|---|---|---|
| Tiverton Parkway | CrossCountry (Scotland and North to Penzance, Manchester to Paignton) | Dawlish |
| Tiverton Parkway | Great Western Railway (Cardiff Central to Penzance, London Paddington to Penzance, London Paddington to Paignton) | Dawlish |
| Exeter Central | Great Western Railway (Avocet Line and Riviera Line) | Exeter St Thomas |
| Exeter Central | Great Western Railway (Tarka Line and Dartmoor Line) | Newton St Cyres |
| Exeter Central | South Western Railway (London Waterloo to Exeter St Davids) | Terminus |

== Cultural impact ==
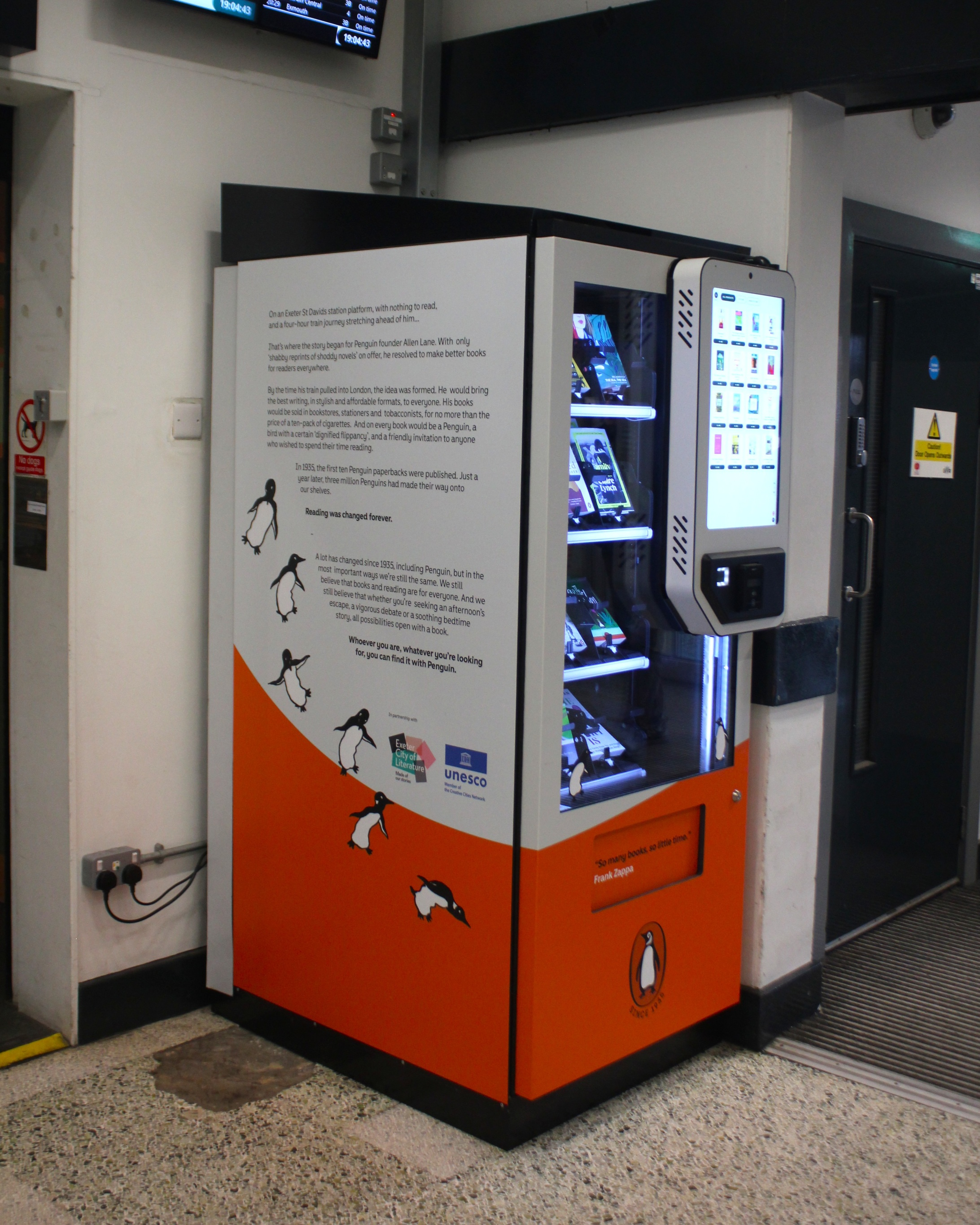
The Penguin Books vending machine at Exeter

Allen Lane, a publisher, had to change trains at Exeter St Davids in 1934. He had been to Greenway to visit Agatha Christie and wanted something to read on his journey home. He was disappointed by the quality of what was on offer at the station bookstall. He then decided to publish books in paper covers that could be carried and read easily on trains. The following year he set up Penguin Books to do this. A vending machine that sells Penguin Books was installed on the concourse at Exeter St Davids in 2023.
