= Sherborne railway station =

Railway station in Dorset, England

Sherborne
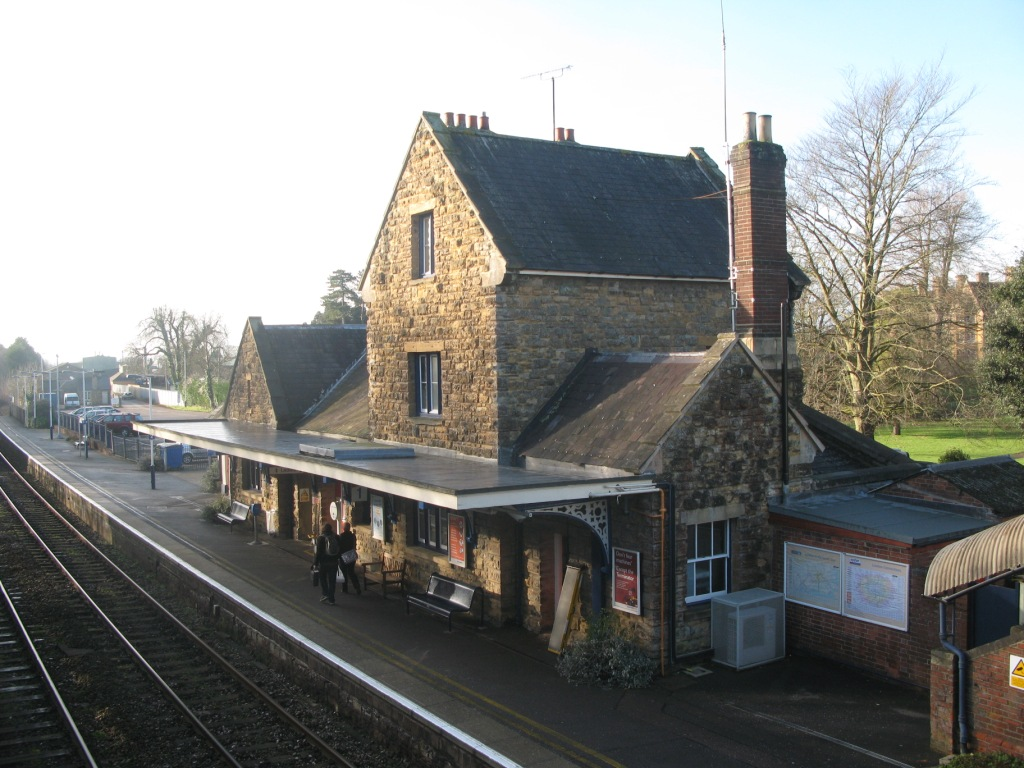

General information
- Location: Sherborne, Dorset; England
- Coordinates: 50.944°N 2.513°W
- Grid reference: ST640161
- Managed by: South Western Railway
- Platforms: 2

Other information
- Station code: SHE
- Classification: DfT category D

History
- Original company: Salisbury and Yeovil Railway
- Pre-grouping: London and South Western Railway
- Post-grouping: Southern Railway

Key dates
- 7 May 1860: Opened

Passengers
- 2020/21: ▼36,452
- 2021/22: ▲0.131 million
- 2022/23: ▲0.155 million
- 2023/24: ▲0.177 million
- 2024/25: ▲0.207 million
Location
Notes
- Passenger statistics from the Office of Rail and Road

Sherborne railway station serves the town of Sherborne in Dorset, England. It is situated on the West of England Main Line, 118 miles 4 chains (190.0 km) down the line from London Waterloo and is currently operated by South Western Railway.

== History ==
The station was opened by the Salisbury and Yeovil Railway (S&YR) on 7 May 1860, when the company extended its line from Gillingham to Sherborne. A level crossing across the line was at the east end of the platforms, and the goods yard with a goods shed at the west end; this and the main buildings were on the north side of the line to be nearer the town. Another siding on the other side of the line served the town's gas works which had been established in 1836. A signal box was erected on the east side of the level crossing and to the south of the line in 1875.

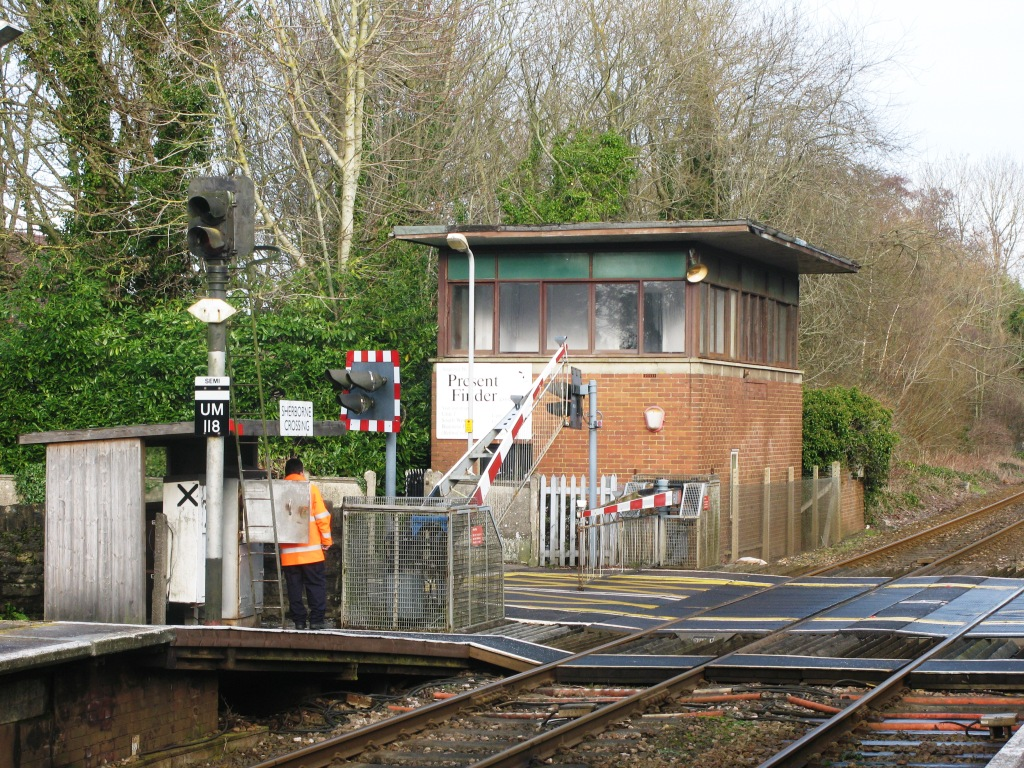
The level crossing with the 1960 disused signal box beyond, in December 2009.

The S&YR never operated any trains, instead they were provided by the London and South Western Railway, which bought out the S&YR in 1878. In 1923 this became part of the Southern Railway, which in turn was nationalised in 1948 to become the Southern Region of British Railways.

In 1960 the signal box was replaced by a new one on the opposite side of the line, but after this a decline set in. From 1963 the line was transferred to the Western Region, and in that year the Reshaping of British Railways report was published. The smaller stations were soon closed, and most trains beyond Exeter St Davids were diverted to other routes. The gas works had stopped receiving coal in 1957 and all goods traffic was stopped from 18 April 1966. On 7 May 1967 the 21 miles (34 km) to Chard Junction was reduced to single track, but this proved a mistake and the double track was restored as far as Yeovil Junction on 1 October. The signal box was closed on 4 January 1970 when the level crossing was converted to lifting barriers which were for many years controlled by a member of staff from a panel at the end of the eastbound platform. In March 2012 a modern signalling system for the Salisbury-Exeter line was commissioned and the line, including crossings, is now controlled remotely by the Basingstoke Rail Operating Centre. Remote control of the crossing eliminated the need for constant staff presence at the station during train operating hours, allowing South West Trains to reduce the hours of ticket office staffing.

Preceding station	Historical railways	Following station
Milborne Port	London and South Western Railway; London Waterloo to Devon and Cornwall	Yeovil Junction
Milborne Port	London and South Western Railway; Salisbury to Yeovil	Yeovil Town

== Platform layout ==
The entrance and offices are on the northern platform which is served by trains going towards London. A large canopy covers much of the other platform. This is normally reached by crossing a footbridge, but people who find this difficult to use can cross the track under the supervision of the signaller who operates the level crossing. The old signal box still stands on the other side of this, and at the other end of the station can be seen the old goods shed.

The station buffet appeared in a list of "highly commended" station cafes published in The Guardian in 2009.

== Services ==
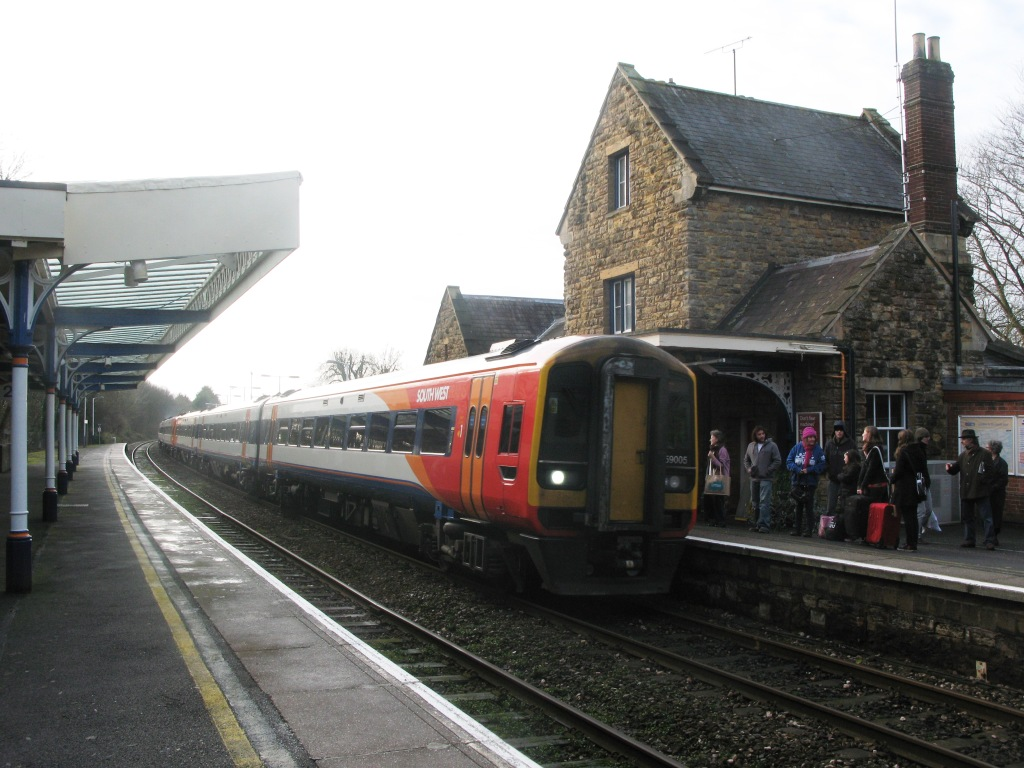
A pair of Class 159 DMUs no. 159005/017 on Exeter St Davids to London Waterloo train calls at Sherborne in December 2009

South Western Railway operate hourly throughout most of the week between Exeter St Davids, Sherborne, Salisbury and London Waterloo station. Services are timetabled to pass at Sherborne but the double track provides some flexibility should one of them be running late.

Preceding station	National Rail	Following station
Templecombe	South Western Railway; West of England Main Line	Yeovil Junction

== See also ==
- Southern Railway routes west of Salisbury
