= Gillingham railway station =

Gillingham railway station can refer to two railway stations in England:

- Gillingham railway station (Kent)
- Gillingham railway station (Dorset)
