= Tisbury =

Tisbury may refer to several places:

- Tisbury, Wiltshire, England, a village in England
  - Tisbury railway station
- Tisbury, Massachusetts, USA, on the island of Martha's Vineyard; named after Tisbury, Wiltshire, England
  - West Tisbury, Massachusetts, USA, a town on Martha's Vineyard that was formerly part of Tisbury
- Tisbury, New Zealand, suburb of Invercargill
