= Cole (for Bruton) railway station =

Former railway station in England

Coordinates: 51.09895°N 2.47123°W

Cole (for Bruton)
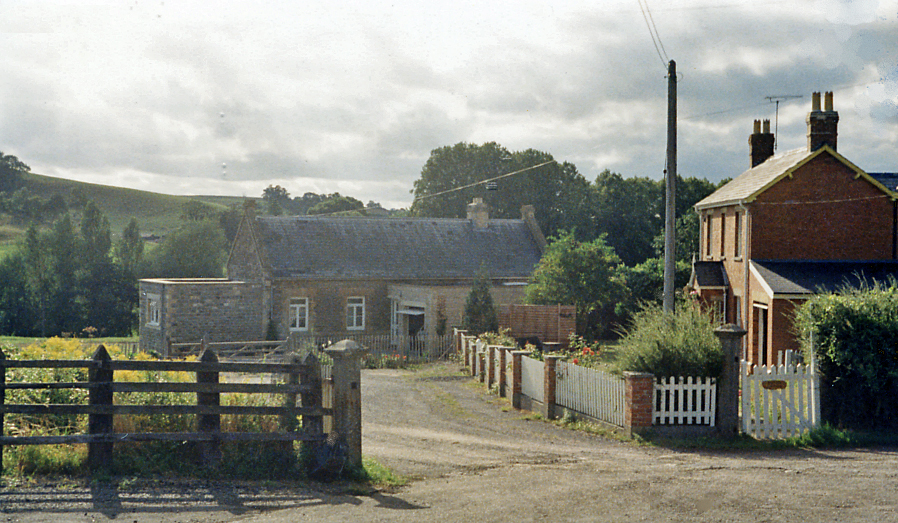
- Location of station (1984)

General information
- Location: Cole, Somerset; England
- Grid reference: ST671334
- Platforms: 2

Other information
- Status: Disused

History
- Original company: Dorset Central Railway
- Pre-grouping: Somerset and Dorset Joint Railway
- Post-grouping: SR and LMSR; Western Region of British Railways

Key dates
- 3 February 1862: Opened
- 7 March 1966: Closed
Location

Cole (for Bruton) railway station was a station on the Somerset and Dorset Railway in South Somerset, serving the village of Cole, which is now virtually joined to the village of Pitcombe and the town of Bruton.

Cole was the station where the Dorset Central Railway line from Templecombe met the Somerset Central Railway line from Glastonbury and Street railway station in 1862. Later that year the two companies combined to form the Somerset and Dorset Railway.

Just north of the station the line crossed the Wilts, Somerset and Weymouth Railway although the two railways were not connected here.

The goods yard closed on 5 April 1965 and Cole station was closed with the railway in the Beeching cuts in 1966.

Preceding station	Disused railways	Following station
Wincanton; Line and station closed	Somerset & Dorset Joint Railway; LSWR and Midland Railways	Evercreech Junction; Line and station closed
