= Tisbury railway station =

Railway station in Wiltshire, England

Tisbury
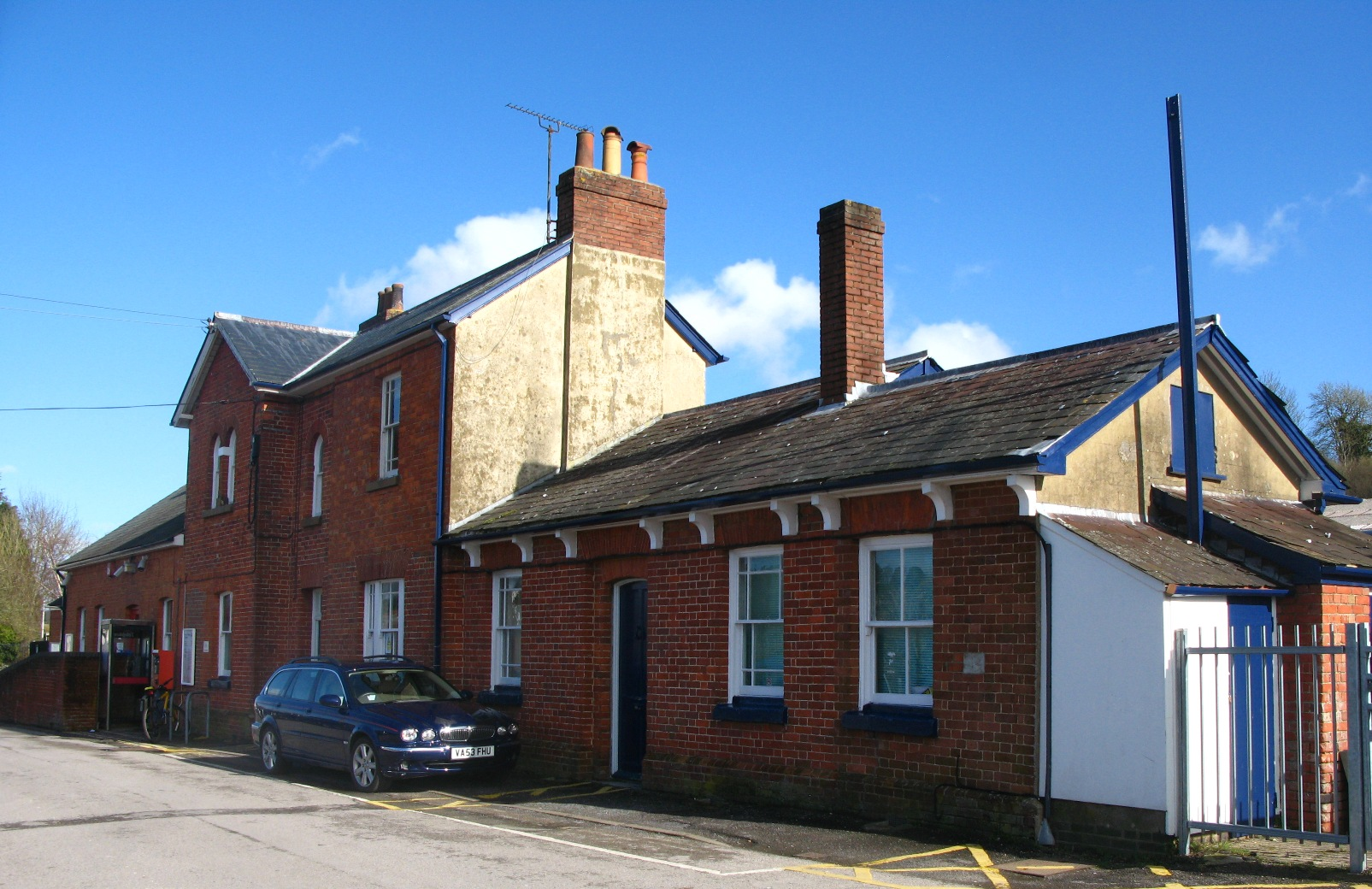

General information
- Location: Tisbury, Wiltshire; England
- Coordinates: 51.061°N 2.079°W
- Grid reference: ST945290
- Managed by: South Western Railway
- Platforms: 1

Other information
- Station code: TIS
- Classification: DfT category E

History
- Original company: Salisbury and Yeovil Railway
- Pre-grouping: London and South Western Railway
- Post-grouping: Southern Railway

Key dates
- 2 May 1859: Opened
- 1 April 1967: Line singled
- 24 March 1986: New loop opened

Passengers
- 2020/21: ▼51,562
- 2021/22: ▲0.126 million
- 2022/23: ▲0.152 million
- 2023/24: ▲0.170 million
- 2024/25: ▲0.191 million
Location
Notes
- Passenger statistics from the Office of Rail and Road

Tisbury railway station serves the village of Tisbury in Wiltshire, England. It is currently managed by South Western Railway and is on the West of England Main Line, 96 miles 14 chains (154.8 km) down the line from London Waterloo.

== History ==
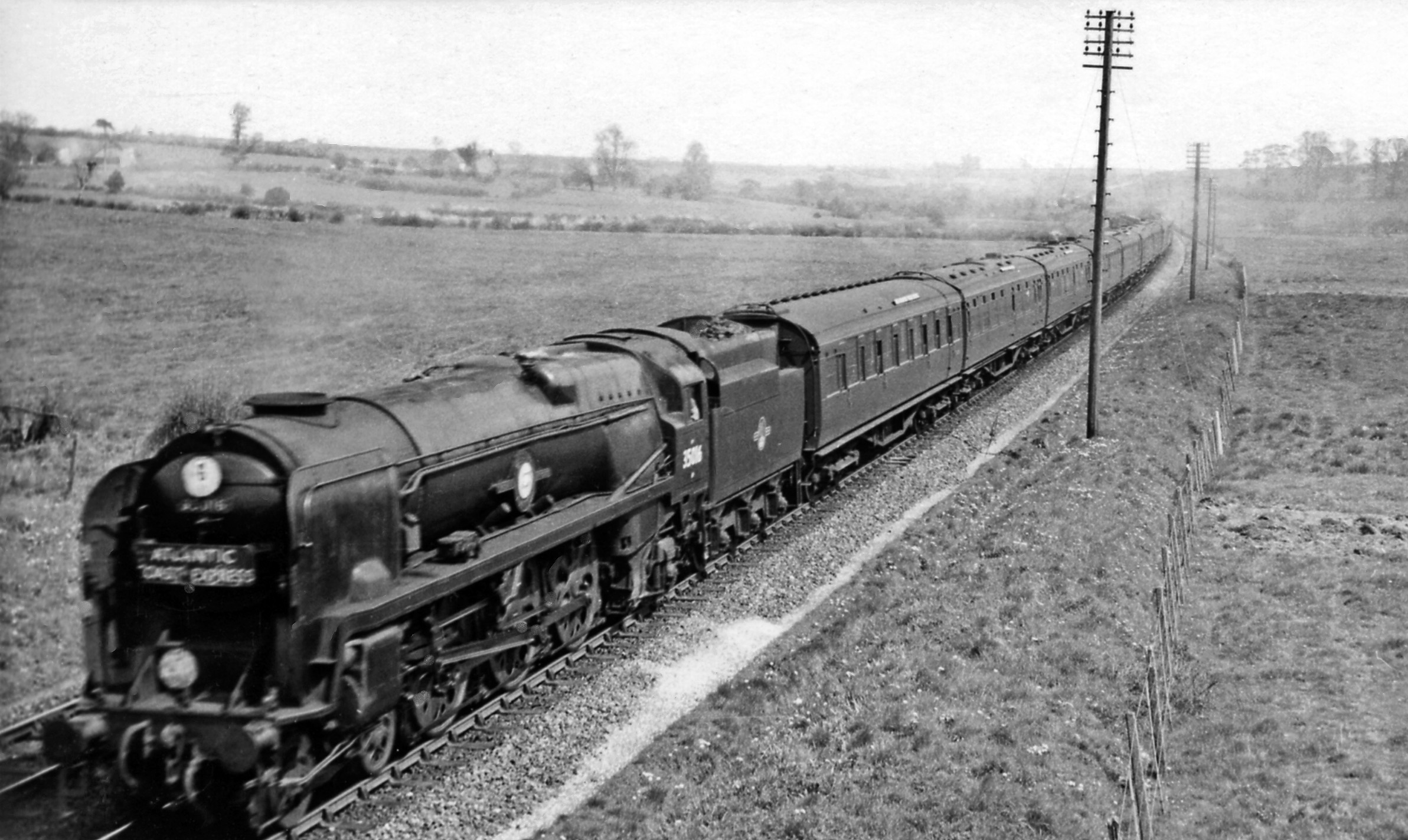
The rebuilt Bulleid Pacific, No. 35016 'Elders Fyffes' on 11:00 Down Atlantic Coast Express west of Tisbury in April 1960

The Salisbury and Yeovil Railway (S&YR) opened Tisbury railway station with the first section of its line, from Salisbury to Gillingham, on 2 May 1859. At first only passengers were catered for, but goods traffic started on 1 September 1860. The main goods yard and warehouse was on the north side of the line at the west end of the station, but some sidings were also added on the opposite side of the line. Initially the railway had just a single track but a passing loop and two platforms were provided at Tisbury. The whole line was double track by 1870 and a signal box was opened here in 1875.

The S&YR never operated any trains, instead they were provided by the London and South Western Railway, which bought out the S&YR in 1878. In 1923 this became part of the Southern Railway, which in turn was nationalised in 1948 to become the Southern Region of British Railways. During all this time there were only incremental changes at Tisbury, but this was to change from 1963. In that year the line was transferred to the Western Region, and the Reshaping of British Railways report was published. The smaller stations were soon closed, and most trains only ran as far as Exeter St Davids, instead of continuing to places such as Ilfracombe, Plymouth and Padstow. Goods traffic was stopped from 18 April 1966 and on 5 February 1967 the signal box was closed, despite having only been opened to replace the original on 12 October 1958. The line was reduced to just a single track on 1 April 1967 and the southern platform sold off to the agricultural suppliers next door. The old station offices still stand, as does the disused signal box which is at the west end of the platform.

The 19-mile (31 km) single-track section from Wilton to Gillingham proved to be too long, and so a loop was reinstated mid-way at Tisbury on 24 March 1986. As the second platform had been sold off, the new £435,000 loop was installed to the east of the station. This means that trains have to wait outside the station when passing; the loop is controlled from Salisbury signal box and is signalled so that trains can run in either direction on each line. A failed (in June 2023) planning application for the development of land once occupied by the second platform and an industrial estate was to include provision for improvements to the station, with land adjacent to the line being safeguarded.

Preceding station	Historical railways	Following station
Dinton	London and South Western Railway; London Waterloo to Devon and Cornwall	Semley

== Services ==
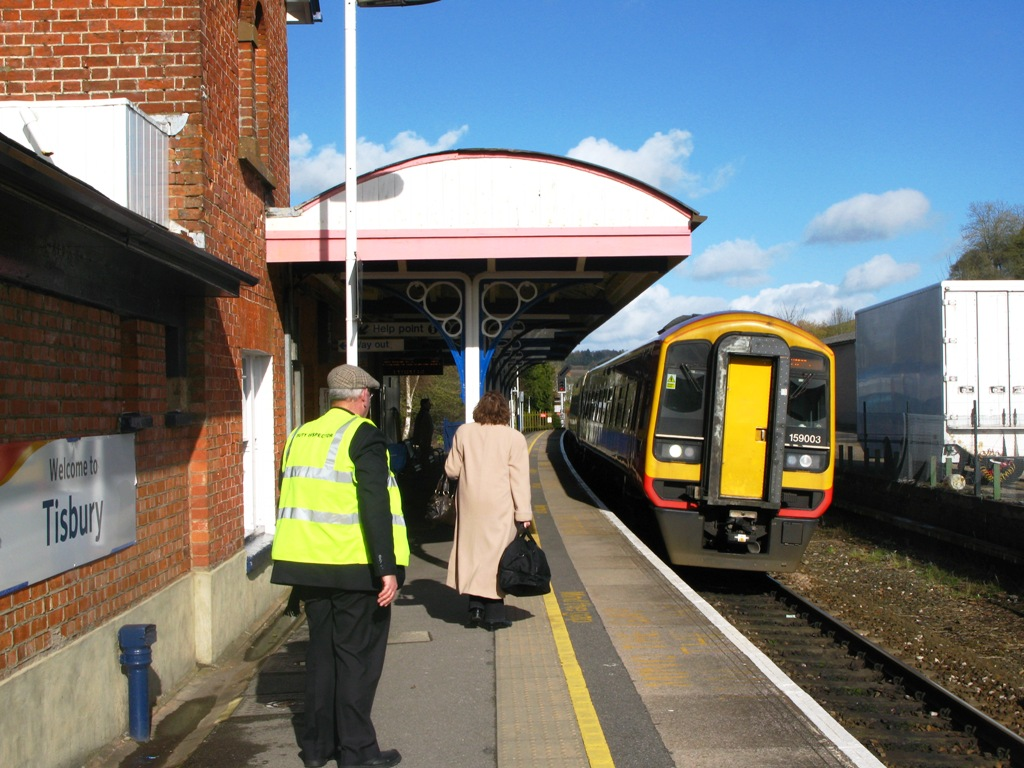
A Class 159 DMU train from London Waterloo to Exeter in February 2010

South Western Railway operate hourly throughout most of the week between Exeter St Davids, Tisbury, Salisbury and London Waterloo station, although extra trains run in peak hours. Trains are timetabled to pass in the loop to the east of the station. Due to the short platform, passengers wishing to alight need to be in the front 3 coaches of the train as the platform can only take 3-car trains.

Preceding station	National Rail	Following station
Salisbury	South Western Railway; West of England Main Line	Gillingham

== See also ==
- Southern Railway routes west of Salisbury
