= Wincanton railway station =

Former railway station in England

Coordinates: 51.0535°N 2.4147°W

Wincanton

General information
- Location: Wincanton, Somerset; England
- Grid reference: ST710282
- Platforms: 2

Other information
- Status: Disused

History
- Original company: Dorset Central Railway
- Pre-grouping: Somerset and Dorset Joint Railway
- Post-grouping: SR and LMSR; Southern Region of British Railways

Key dates
- 3 February 1862: Opened
- 7 March 1966: Closed
Location

Wincanton railway station was a station in the county of Somerset, in England. It was located on the Somerset and Dorset Joint Railway.

Sited on a double line stretch of the S&D, the station had two platforms with a station building. A goods yard, controlled from a signal box on platform one, gave access to sidings for the use of the horses from the local racecourse. The Cow & Gate creamery and dairy products factory had its own sidings, providing access for milk trains.

== History ==
The station was opened on 3 February 1862 by the Dorset Central Railway which later became part of the Somerset and Dorset Joint Railway. Goods Yard closed 5 April 1965. The station was closed when the S&DJR closed on 7 March 1966.

Preceding station	Disused railways	Following station
Templecombe; Line closed, station open	Somerset & Dorset Joint Railway; LSWR and Midland Railways	Cole; Line and station closed
