= Gillingham railway station (Dorset) =

Railway station in Dorset, England

Gillingham
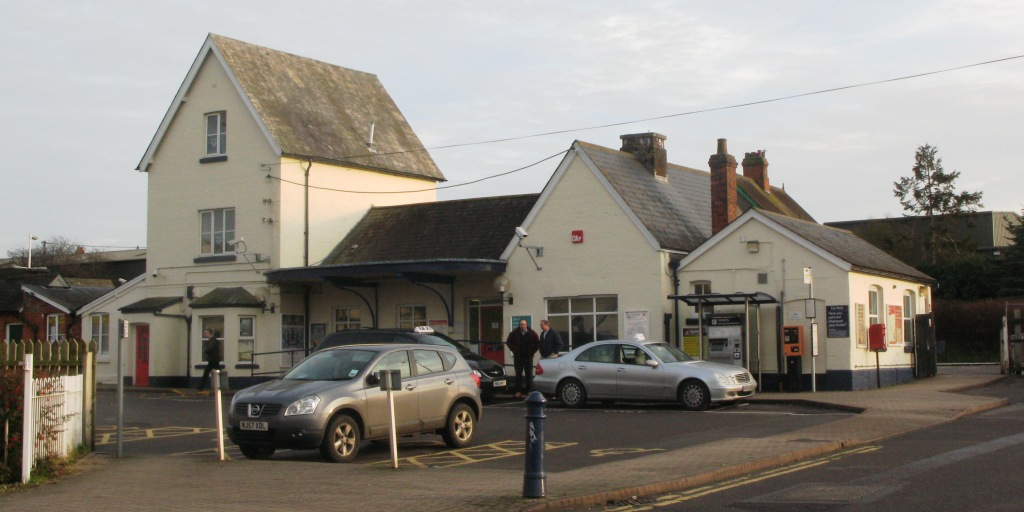

General information
- Location: Gillingham, Dorset; England
- Coordinates: 51.034°N 2.273°W
- Grid reference: ST809261
- Managed by: South Western Railway
- Platforms: 2

Other information
- Station code: GIL
- Classification: DfT category D

History
- Original company: Salisbury and Yeovil Railway
- Pre-grouping: London and South Western Railway
- Post-grouping: Southern Railway

Key dates
- 2 May 1859: Line opened from Salisbury
- 1 June 1860: Line extended westwards
- 1 April 1967: Line singled

Passengers
- 2020/21: ▼82,042
- 2021/22: ▲0.227 million
- 2022/23: ▲0.278 million
- 2023/24: ▲0.302 million
- 2024/25: ▲0.358 million
Location
Notes
- Passenger statistics from the Office of Rail and Road

Gillingham railway station serves the town of Gillingham, Dorset, England. It is on the West of England Main Line, 105 miles 23 chains (169.4 km) down the line from London Waterloo. Today it is managed by South Western Railway. The main offices, designed by Sir William Tite, stand on the north side of the line.

It is commonly suffixed as Gillingham (Dorset) to avoid confusion with a station of the same name in Kent.

== History ==
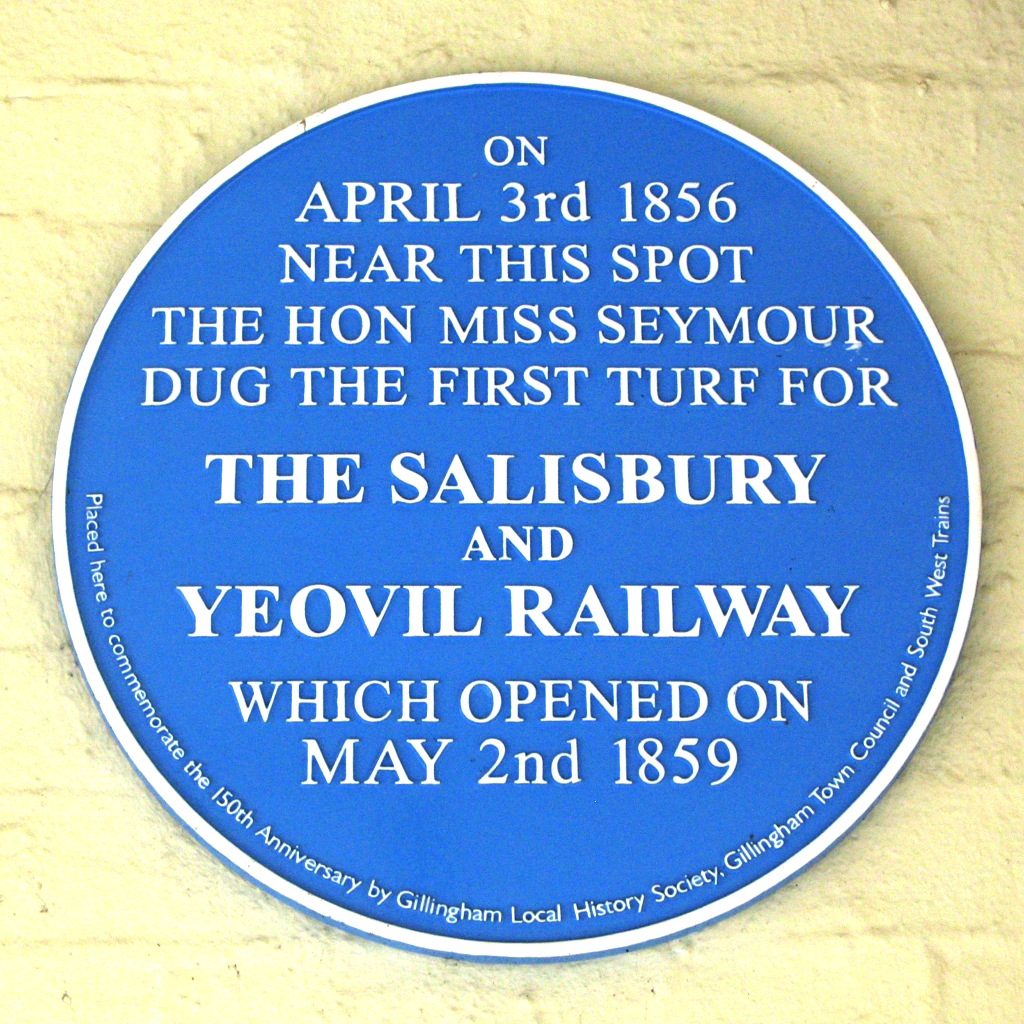
A plaque on the main platform commemorates the 150th anniversary of the Salisbury and Yeovil Railway - photo taken in December 2009

On 3 April 1856 Miss Seymour, sister of the company’s chairman, dug the first ceremonial sod for the Salisbury and Yeovil Railway (S&YR) at Gillingham. Three years later, on 2 May 1859, the railway from Salisbury opened to Gillingham, and was completed to Hendford station at Yeovil on 1 June 1860. The station was close to the town centre. The main offices and goods shed were on the north side of the line, further sidings to serve a brickworks were added on the other side of the line, and a signal box opened in 1875. Trains were provided for the S&YR by the London and South Western Railway (LSWR), which bought out the smaller company in 1878. In the twentieth century the LSWR operated motor bus services from Gillingham station to Mere, Zeals and Shaftesbury.

In 1923 the LSWR became part of the Southern Railway, which in turn was nationalised in 1948 to become the Southern Region of British Railways. A new signal box was opened on 28 April 1957, but on 5 April 1965 public goods services were withdrawn. Three years later a fertiliser distribution depot was opened in the old goods yard (it closed in 1993). The line had been transferred to the Western Region in 1963, and through trains beyond Exeter St Davids were soon diverted along other routes. The line was reduced to just a single track on 1 April 1967 with a passing loop retained at Gillingham. Initially the single-track sections were 7-mile (11 km) westwards to Templecombe and 19-mile (31 km) eastwards to Wilton, but the latter was shortened to 9-mile (14 km) to Tisbury in 1986. The former signal box (now reduced to ground frame status following the 2012 resignalling) is at the west end of the station by the end of this platform.

| Preceding station | Historical railways | Following station |
|---|---|---|
| Semley | London and South Western Railway; London Waterloo to Devon and Cornwall | Templecombe |

== Platform layout ==
The track serving the northern platform is signalled for trains to run in either direction so most trains use this platform unless two need to pass. The southern platform, which is reached by a footbridge, is then used for the westbound train.

== Services ==
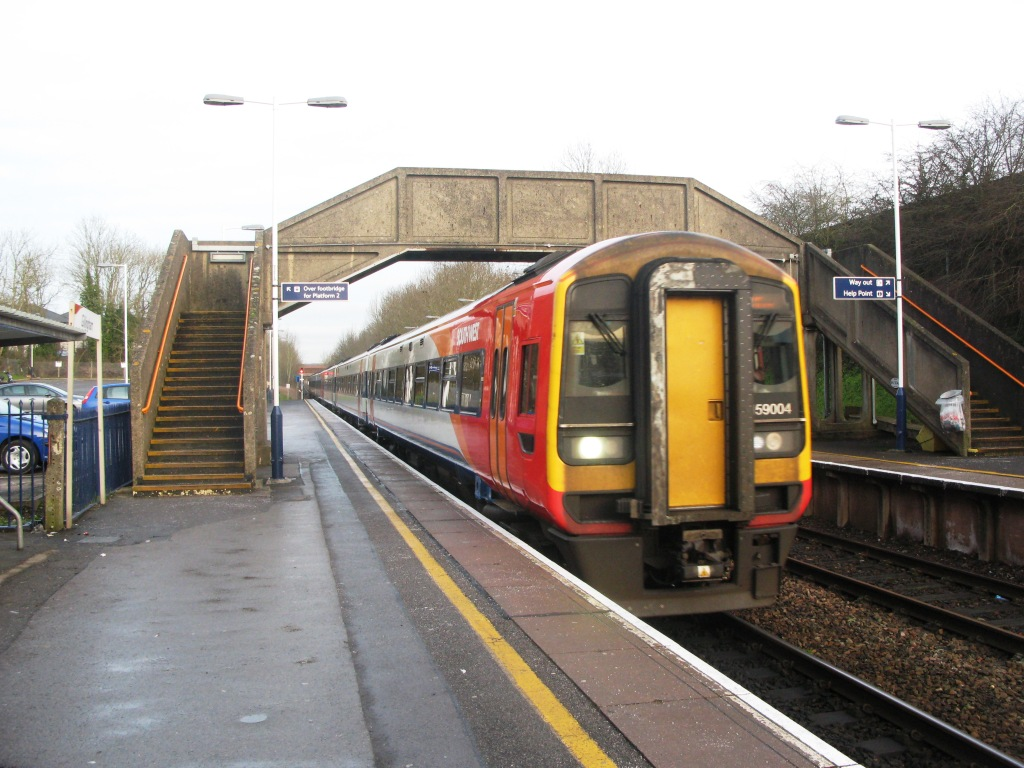
A train arriving from London Waterloo

South Western Railway operate hourly services between London Waterloo and Exeter St Davids.

| Preceding station | National Rail | Following station |
|---|---|---|
| Tisbury | South Western Railway; West of England Main Line | Templecombe |

== See also ==
- Southern Railway routes west of Salisbury
