= Dinton railway station =

Disused railway station in England

Dinton
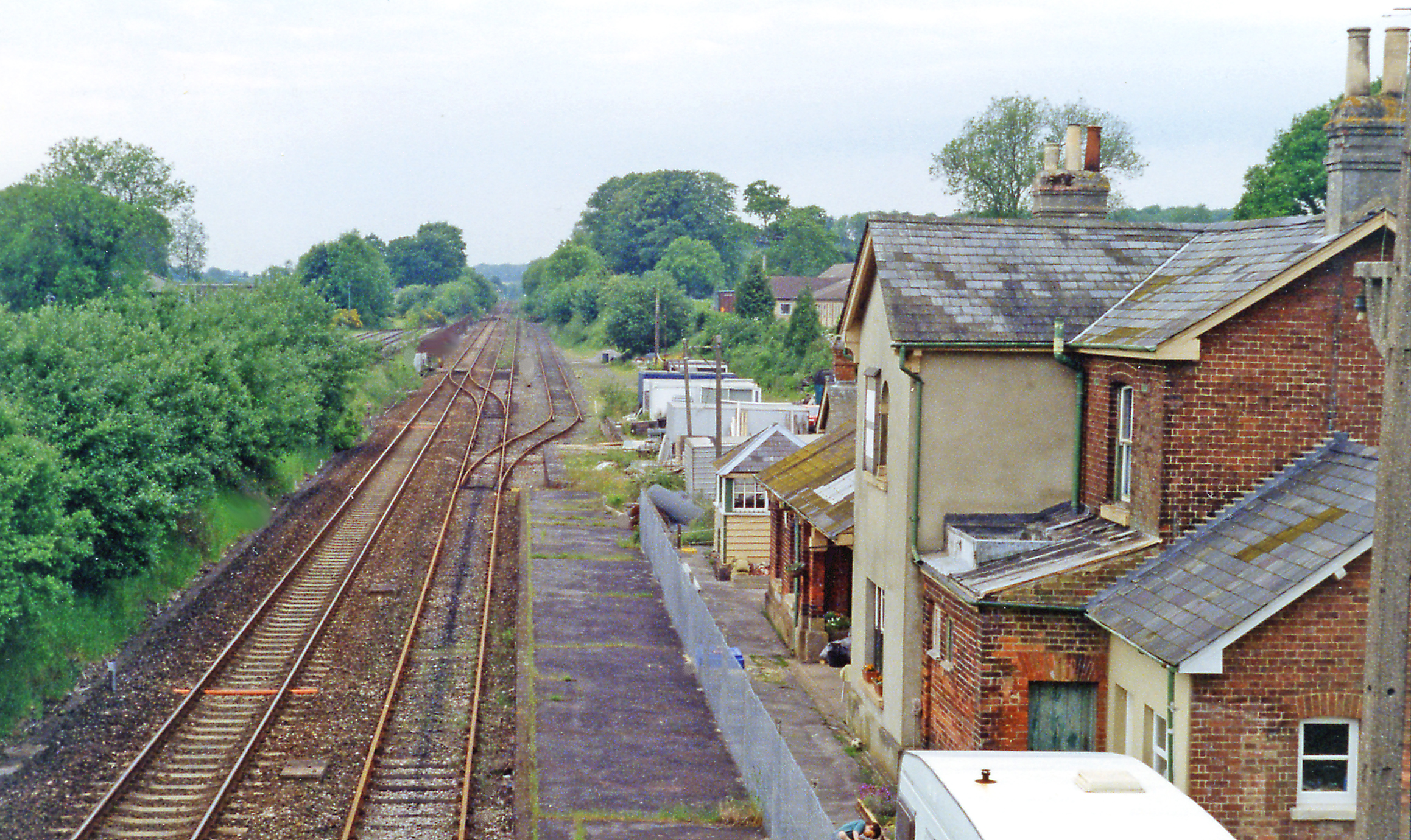
- The station buildings in 1994

General information
- Location: Dinton, Wiltshire; England
- Coordinates: 51.0781°N 1.9876°W
- Platforms: 2

Other information
- Status: Disused

History
- Original company: Salisbury and Yeovil Railway
- Pre-grouping: London and South Western Railway
- Post-grouping: Southern Railway

Key dates
- 1859: Opened
- 7 March 1966: Closed for passengers
- 18 April 1967: Closed completely
Location

Dinton railway station is a disused railway station which formerly served Dinton in Wiltshire, England. It was situated on the West of England Main Line from London Waterloo station to Exeter. It was opened in 1859 and closed to passengers in 1966 and to general goods traffic in 1967. In the First World War, it was the junction for the Fovant Military Railway. The station was about ½ mile from the centre of the village.

== History ==
The station was opened on 2 May 1859 by the Salisbury and Yeovil Railway, which became part of the London and South Western Railway in 1878. In the 1923 grouping the L&SWR became part of the Southern Railway, but in 1948 nationalisation it was transferred to British Railways Southern Region and in 1963 to BR Western Region. BR withdrew local passenger trains and closed the station on 7 March 1966, although goods traffic continued until 18 April 1967.

Following closure, several sidings were retained for access to the various Ministry of Defence depots nearby, together with a section of the former up line westwards to a depot at Chilmark. These were taken out of use in 1994 and most of the track has been removed. The former Up platform remains in existence, complete with the station buildings, which are now a private residence. The Waterloo to Exeter route is now a single line through Dinton, with Tisbury being the nearest station.

== Services ==
The station was served by trains on the London Waterloo to Exeter line.

== Fovant Military Railway ==
During the First World War, several military camps were built to the south of Dinton covering an area from Compton Chamberlayne to Sutton Mandeville, centred on Fovant on the A30 road. In 1915, a railway was built from Dinton station to the camps at Fovant; the line was two and a half miles in length and had a ruling gradient of 1 in 35. It was opened on 15 October 1915. After the War ended the Fovant camps were used as a major demobilization centre and Dinton station handled thousands of soldiers. The demobilization work ended on 16 January 1920, and the branch was handed over to the London and South Western Railway on 26 April 1920. They operated a twice-weekly freight train until the military camps closed on 23 November 1920. The station itself closed on 18 December 1920, although it was re-opened the following year, to assist in the removal of the camps, and was finally closed in 1924.

== Bibliography ==
Notes

References

- Crawford, T. S. (2012). Wiltshire and the great war: Training the Empire's Soldiers. Crowood. ISBN 9781847974471. - Total pages: 208
- Faulkner, J. N.; Williams, Ronald Alfred (1988). The London & South Western Railway in the 20th Century. David & Charles. ISBN 9780715389270. - Total pages: 224

| Preceding station | Historical railways | Following station |
|---|---|---|
| Wilton South | London and South Western Railway; West of England Main Line | Tisbury |
