= Salisbury and Yeovil Railway =

Former railway company in England

Overview
- Locale: England
- Dates of operation: 1859–1878
- Successor: London and South Western Railway

Technical
- Track gauge: 4 ft 8 1/2 in (1,435 mm)
- Length: 40 miles (64 km)

The Salisbury and Yeovil Railway linked Salisbury (Wiltshire), Gillingham (Dorset) and Yeovil (Somerset) in England. Opened in stages in 1859 and 1860, it formed a bridge route between the main London and South Western Railway (LSWR) network and its lines in Devon and Cornwall. Its trains were operated by the LSWR and it was sold to that company in 1878. Apart from a short section in Yeovil it remains open and carries the London Waterloo to Exeter service of South Western Railway.

Despite being founded after the "Railway Mania" of the 1840s, it proved to be one of the most profitable railways in the United Kingdom. This was in part due to carrying all LSWR trains to the south west, and in part due to the very good terms agreed for the LSWR to operate the trains. When the company finally sold out to the LSWR in 1878, it held out for a price which saw the shareholders receive more than the face value of their shares.

== History ==
London and South Western Railway (Salisbury and Yeovil Extension) Act 1848
- Act of Parliament
- Parliament of the United Kingdom
- Long title: An Act to enable the London and South-Western Railway Company to make a Railway from Salisbury to Yeovil, with Branches to Shaftesbury, and to the Exeter, Yeovil, and Dorchester and Wilts, Somerset, and Weymouth Railways.
- Citation: 11 & 12 Vict. c. lxxxvii

Dates
- Royal assent: 22 July 1848

Text of statute as originally enacted

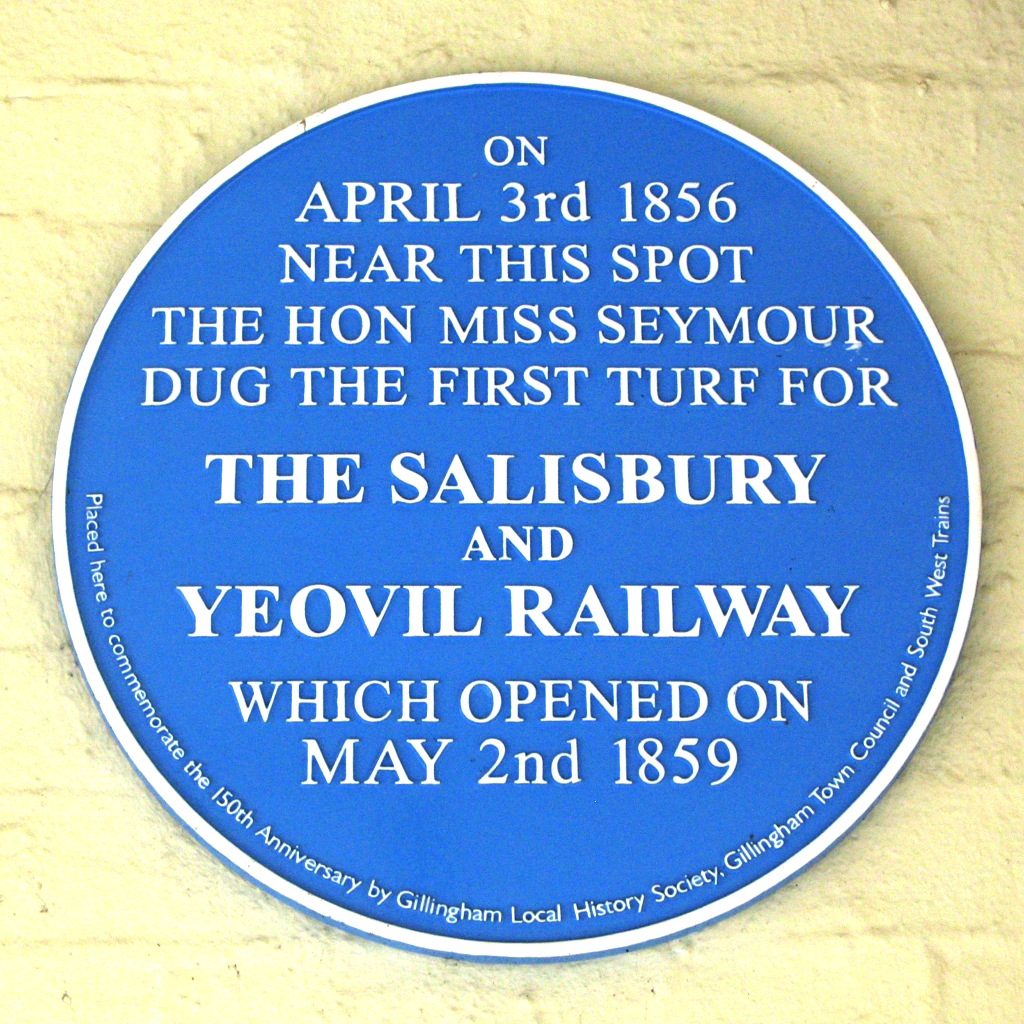
The commemorative plaque at Gillingham

The LSWR was completed to Southampton in 1840 and a branch line was opened in 1848 from Bishopstoke to Milford station in Salisbury. Within a few years efforts started on work to extend from Southampton to Dorchester. A great debate then started within the LSWR about whether to extend further west through Salisbury (the shorter "central route" or through Dorchester (the more populous "coastal route"). The rival Great Western Railway (GWR) was supporting the Wilts, Somerset and Weymouth Railway as an alternative route to Dorchester, which was to be built from the north through Yeovil. It also proposed a connecting line from Yeovil to Exeter which would have been in direct competition with either of the two proposed LSWR routes. Both companies applied for powers to construct new lines in 1846; the LSWR for a line from Basingstoke to Yeovil and both companies for different lines from Yeovil to Exeter. Neither was approved and so new applications were made in 1847, and after a mammoth 50-day hearing it was decided that the LSWR scheme was the better. Both the London and South Western Railway (Salisbury and Yeovil Extension) Act 1848 (11 & 12 Vict. c. lxxxvii) and the Exeter, Yeovil and Dorchester Railway Act 1848 (11 & 12 Vict. c. lxxxv) received royal assent on 22 July 1848.

Salisbury and Yeovil Railway Act 1854
- Act of Parliament
- Parliament of the United Kingdom
- Long title: An Act for making a Railway from the London and South-western Railway at Salisbury to Yeovil, and to form a Junction with the Railways at Yeovil of the Great Western and Bristol and Exeter Railway Companies respectively; and for other Purposes.
- Citation: 17 & 18 Vict. c. ccxv

Dates
- Royal assent: 7 August 1854

Text of statute as originally enacted

The large number of new railway schemes approved at that time caused an economic depression; it proved difficult to raise the money needed for the work and so the powers lapsed. Three years later an independent company tried to raise the money for a Salisbury to Exeter line and the LSWR agreed to take up half the shares, guarantee a 4% return on the shareholders' investment, and operate the trains. However a large faction in the LSWR now preferred the coastal route that could use the already constructed line to Dorchester, while still others opposed westward extension by any route. Another independent company now put forward their own proposals for a Salisbury and Yeovil Railway, and they were rewarded by the Salisbury and Yeovil Railway Act 1854 (17 & 18 Vict. c. ccxv) which was passed on 7 August 1854.

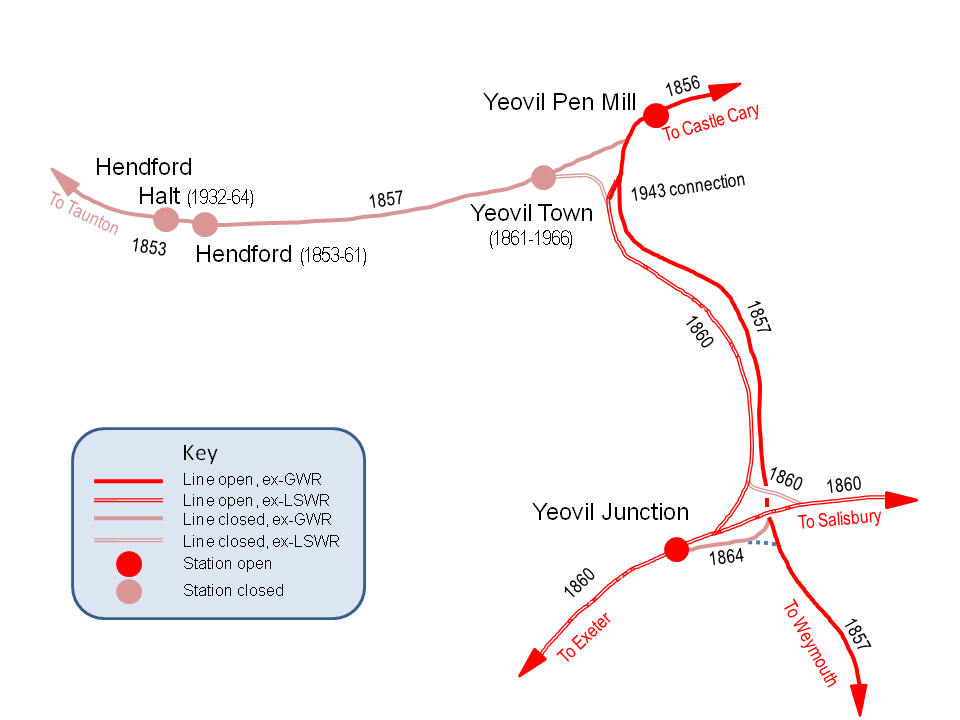
Railways around Yeovil

The LSWR now applied for powers for a direct line from near Basingstoke to Salisbury. This had been proposed in the 1830s, authorised in 1846 but, like the original Salisbury and Yeovil line, had not been constructed. To get these renewed powers the company was forced by Parliament to commit to building the Yeovil to Exeter extension, and so the nominally independent Salisbury and Yeovil would link two otherwise isolated sections of the LSWR. The LSWR therefore agreed to subscribe to the shares, and to work the trains in return for 42.5% of the receipts.

The line opened in three stages. From a new Fisherton station in Salisbury to Gillingham on 1 May 1859; from there to Sherborne on 7 May 1860, and finally to Yeovil on 1 June 1860. It used the Bristol and Exeter Railway's Hendford station until a new joint Yeovil Town railway station was opened on 1 June 1861. In the meantime, the LSWR's line from Bradford Abbas Junction to Exeter Queen Street had opened on 19 July 1860. Although initially just a single track with passing loops at stations, work started in 1861 to double 2 1/2 miles (4 km) westwards from Salisbury, and 4 miles (6 km) east from Sherborne. The whole route was doubled within ten years.

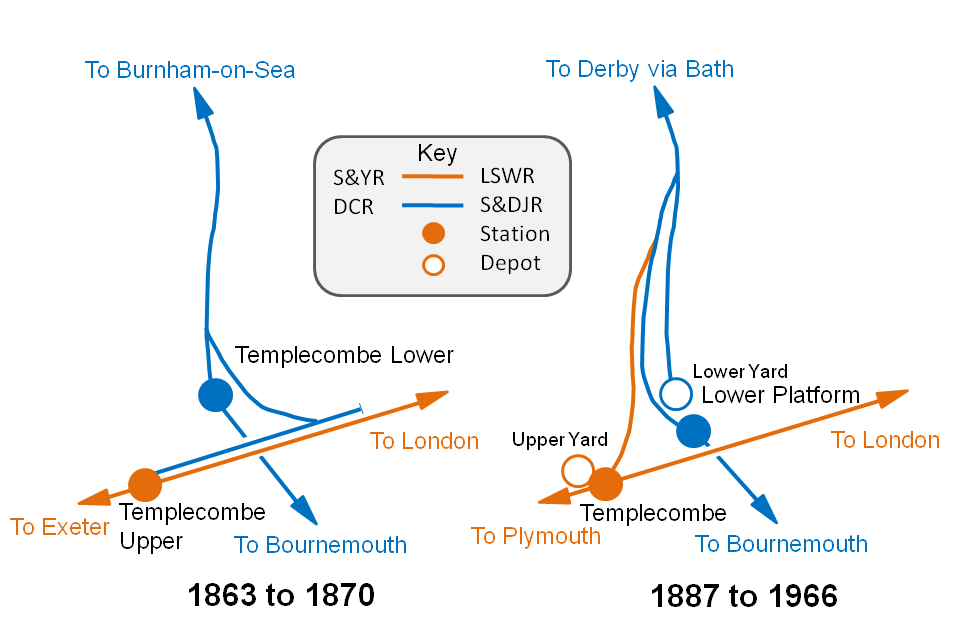
The new junction arrangements at Templecombe

In 1861 the Dorset Central Railway arrived at Templecombe. The station for this line was at a lower level than the S&YR but a junction was established to allow traffic to be exchanged. This was a rather unusual arrangement that entailed Dorset trains reversing into the S&YR station on a line alongside the main line. This space was needed for doubling the Salisbury line in 1870 so a new Templecombe Junction Railway was built by the S&YR that allowed trains from the north to run directly into the main line station. In 1874 the lower line, by now the Somerset and Dorset Joint Railway and part-owned by the LSWR, was extended to Bath Green Park where a connection was made with the Midland Railway. This brought even more traffic onto the S&YR in the form of goods and passengers from the North to the LSWR.

Bradford Abbas Junction was closed on 1 January 1870, after which time all trains to Yeovil had to run via Yeovil Junction. In January 1878 the company was sold to the LSWR.

== Finances ==
Year	Dividend
1861	4.375%
1862	4.25%
1863	4.625%
1864	5%
1865	5.25%
1866	6.5%
1867	6.5%
1868	6.25%
1869	6.25%
1870	6.25%
1871	6.75%
1872	7.25%
1873	8.75%
1874	8.75%
1875	9.75%
1876	11.25%
1877	12.5%

The capital of the railway was divided into £100 shares. An agreement was made with the LSWR, under which that company would provide the locomotives and stock required and operate the trains for 42.5% of the gross receipts. After twenty years this would be converted into a lease at a fixed price to be set once the traffic levels and costs had been determined. The 57.5% remaining with the S&YR was to pay the capital costs including a dividend to the shareholders. This was paid in two annual instalments and was never less than 4.25% per annum; in the last five years it was in excess of 8% (see table, right). The LSWR itself owned 10,000 of the shares; it nominated two directors but had no voting powers at shareholders meetings.

The line cost £500,758 (equivalent to £53 million as of 2025), to construct and when it was completed the LSWR had an option to purchase it for £567,000. In 1872 they offered to exchange £100 of S&YR shares for LSWR preference shares with a market value of £170 which would pay £7 10s dividend; the S&YR shareholders turned this down. In January 1878 they accepted a new offer of £250 of LSWR preference shares. A shareholder who bought a single £100 share at face value when issued and retained it until 1878 would have received £120 5s in dividends. Once it had been exchanged for LSWR shares they could be sold for £347 16s or retained to bring an annual income of £13 in dividends. This has caused modern historians to describe the company as "the most successful of all railways in Southern England".

== Key personnel ==
The chairman of the company was Henry Dandy Seymour. He died in 1877 and was succeeded by John Chapman. The secretary was Mr H Notman, who held the second largest block of voting shares. Another notable shareholder was Louis H Ruegg, who persuaded his fellow shareholders to reject the LSWR buy-out offer of 1872. He was a local journalist and published a history of the company in 1878.

The railway's engineer was Joseph Locke. Once an assistant to Robert Stephenson, he served as engineer to the LSWR until 1849 but left them as he preferred the central route to Exeter rather than the coastal one proposed at the time. Stations were designed by William Tite. The actual construction of the line was contracted to Thomas Brassey, although he sub-contracted the actual work to other people.

== Route ==
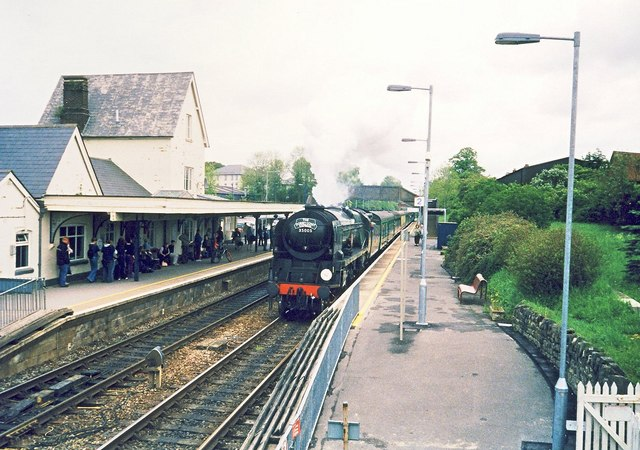
Gillingham station

The railway made an end-on junction with the LSWR at its new Salisbury railway station, which opened on the same day in 1859 as the line to Gillingham and was next door to the existing GWR station. The line ran north-westwards close to the GWR's Salisbury Branch Line almost the whole 2.6 miles (4.2 km) to the first station, Wilton. Here the S&YR turned west towards Dinton (8.4 mi (13.5 km) from Salisbury). The next stations were at Tisbury (12.6 mi (20.3 km)) and then Semley (17.6 mi (28.3 km)), the station for Shaftesbury. To get to here, the summit of the line 260 feet (79 m) above Salisbury, the line had been climbing steadily, mostly at gentle gradients and nowhere steeper than 1 in 120 (0.8%), but from Semley the line dropped down at grades as steep as 1 in 100 (1%) to Gillingham (21.7 mi (34.9 km)).

The line then climbed on similar grades for 2.5 mi (4.0 km) up to Buckhorn Weston Tunnel. This was 742 yards (678 m) long, the only tunnel between Salisbury and Yeovil. It proved difficult to construct, with many problems due to water and soft ground.

The line drops steeply for a couple of miles, followed by a brief level section in the Blackmoor Vale. The junction with the Somerset and Dorset Joint Railway at Templecombe (28.5 mi (45.9 km)) was mid-way up the next climb, which ended shortly before Milborne Port station (30.9 mi (49.7 km)). Apart from one short climb approaching Yeovil, it was now downhill all the way and the steepest gradient on the line is found here, dropping down to Sherborne (34.5 mi (55.5 km)) at 1 in 80 (1.25%).

At Bradford Abbas (38.5 mi (62.0 km)) the Yeovil line parted company with the LSWR main line to Exeter, swinging north-westward to cross over the GWR's Wilts, Somerset and Weymouth line on a bridge, then dropping down alongside this before heading west to the Yeovil Town terminus (40 miles (64 km)). For the first year, until the Town station was completed, the railway continued alongside the Yeovil Branch Line of the Bristol and Exeter Railway to reach that company's Hendford station. This track was retained for goods traffic even after the passenger traffic at Hendford had transferred to Yeovil Town.

=== Surviving features ===
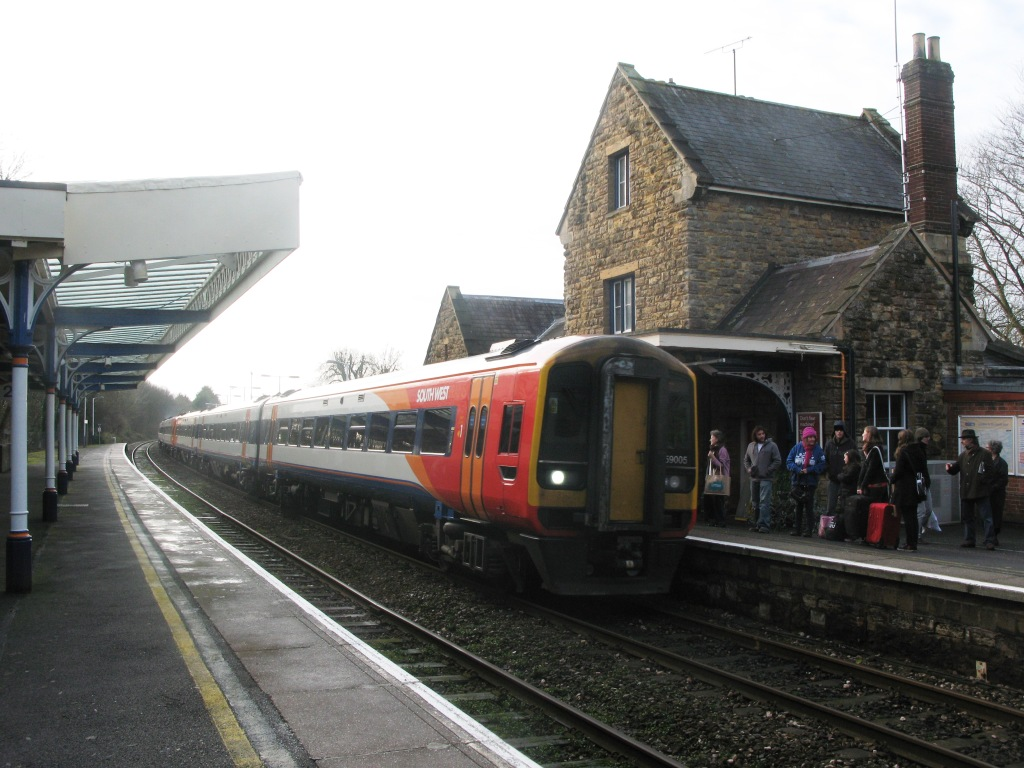
A Class 159 train at Sherborne

Most of the line remains open and carries South Western Railway's hourly services from London Waterloo to Exeter St Davids. The section from Wilton to Templecombe has reverted to single track with passing loops at Tisbury and Gillingham. Of the original eight stations (excluding Salisbury), only those at Tisbury, Gillingham, Templecombe, and Sherborne remain open. Templecombe was closed from 1966 to 1983 and nothing remains of the original station.

== See also ==
- Southern Railway routes west of Salisbury
