= Semley railway station =

Former railway station in England

Semley
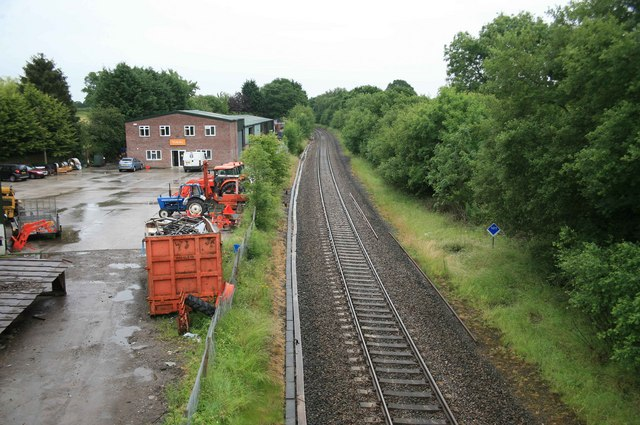
- Semley station site in July 2010

General information
- Location: Semley, Wiltshire; England
- Coordinates: 51.040°N 2.183°W
- Grid reference: ST873267
- Platforms: 2

Other information
- Status: Disused

History
- Original company: Salisbury and Yeovil Railway
- Pre-grouping: London and South Western Railway
- Post-grouping: Southern Railway; Western Region of British Railways

Key dates
- 2 May 1859: Station opened
- 7 March 1966: Station closed
Location

Semley was a railway station in Wiltshire, England. It was served by trains on the West of England Main Line and was the railhead for the town of Shaftesbury, Dorset, 2 1/2 miles (4 km) to the south.

Although several plans were made to give Shaftesbury its own station, the town's position on a hill prevented this. The nearest station to Shaftesbury is now Gillingham.

== History ==
The station was opened on 2 May 1859 by the Salisbury and Yeovil Railway, which became part of the London and South Western Railway in 1878. In the 1923 grouping the L&SWR became part of the Southern Railway, but in the 1948 nationalisation it was transferred to British Railways Southern Region and in 1963 to BR Western Region. BR withdrew local passenger trains and closed the station on 7 March 1966.

== The site today ==
An industrial and commercial estate occupies the site just off the A350 road between Shaftesbury and Warminster. The former station building, goods shed and signal box survive. Trains on the West of England Main Line still use the line through the site.

Preceding station	Disused railways	Following station
Gillingham	London and South Western Railway; West of England Main Line	Tisbury
