= Templecombe railway station =

Railway station in Somerset, England

Templecombe
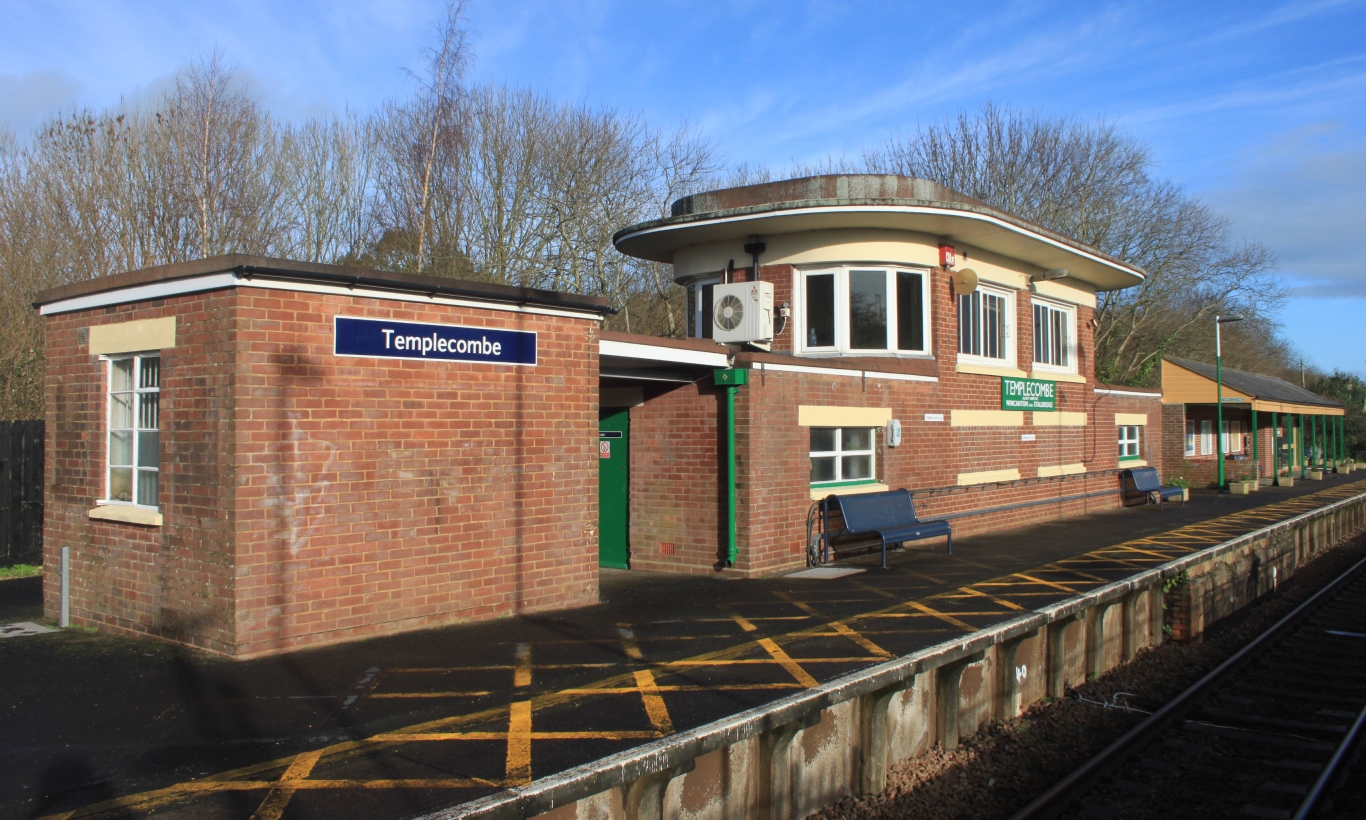
- The old 1938 signal box and waiting room in December 2015

General information
- Location: Templecombe, Somerset; England
- Coordinates: 51.002°N 2.4164°W
- Grid reference: ST707225
- Manager: South Western Railway
- Platforms: 1

Other information
- Station code: TMC
- Classification: DfT category E

History
- Original company: Salisbury and Yeovil Railway
- Pre-grouping: London and South Western Railway
- Post-grouping: Southern Railway

Key dates
- 7 May 1860: Upper station opened
- 3 February 1862: Lower station opened
- 7 March 1966: Closed
- 3 October 1983: Upper station reopened

Passengers
- 2020/21: ▼20,488
- 2021/22: ▲57,088
- 2022/23: ▲68,276
- 2023/24: ▲79,776
- 2024/25: ▲91,732
Location
Notes
- Passenger statistics from the Office of Rail and Road

Templecombe railway station serves the village of Templecombe in Somerset, England. It is situated on the West of England Main Line, 112 miles 2 chains (180.3 km) down the line from London Waterloo. The main station opened in 1860 but a smaller station on the lower line opened in 1862. It was closed in 1966 but was reopened in 1983 following local community pressure. It is currently operated by South Western Railway.

== History ==
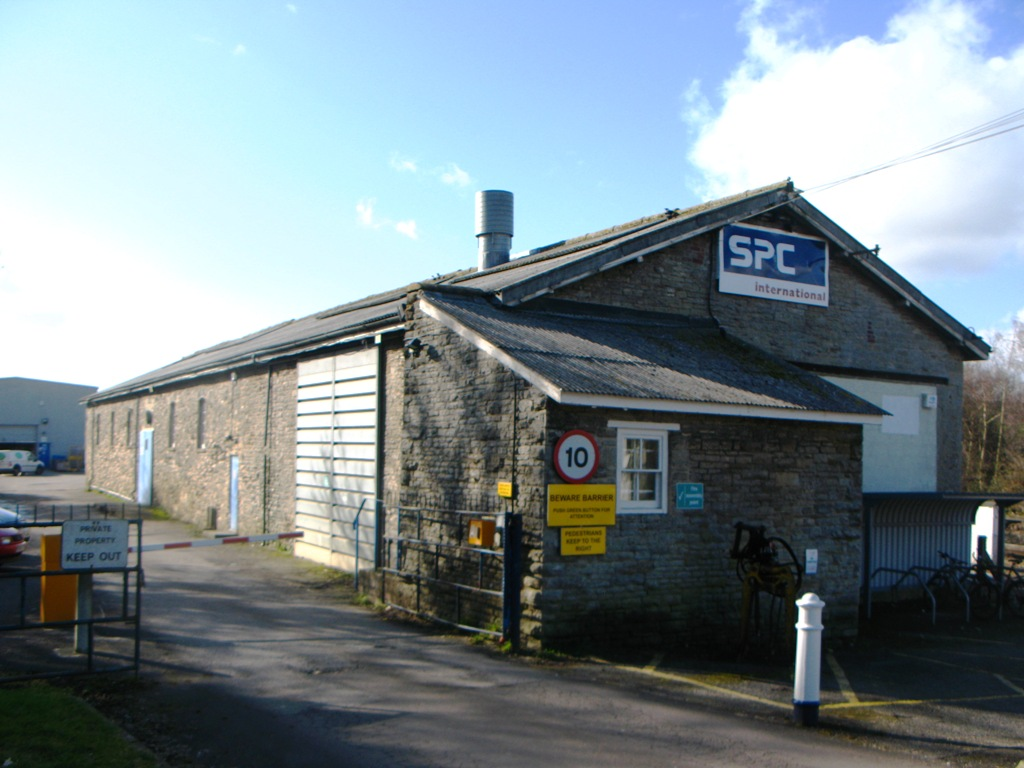
The old railway goods shed at Templecombe station in February 2010

The Salisbury and Yeovil Railway (S&YR) opened the second part of its line on 7 May 1860, extending westwards from Gillingham through Templecombe (the 'Upper' station) to Sherborne. The S&YR never operated any trains, which were provided by the London and South Western Railway (LSWR). On 3 February 1862, the Dorset Central Railway opened its own Templecombe Lower station as the terminus of a line which connected with the Somerset Central Railway's line from Burnham-on-Sea; on 31 August 1863 this was extended beneath the S&YR line to join up with the remainder of that Dorset company's line to Bournemouth. By now the two 'Central' companies had joined as the Somerset and Dorset Railway. From November 1875 this became the Somerset and Dorset Joint Railway (S&DJR), which was partly owned by the LSWR, and in January 1878 the LSWR also bought the S&YR.

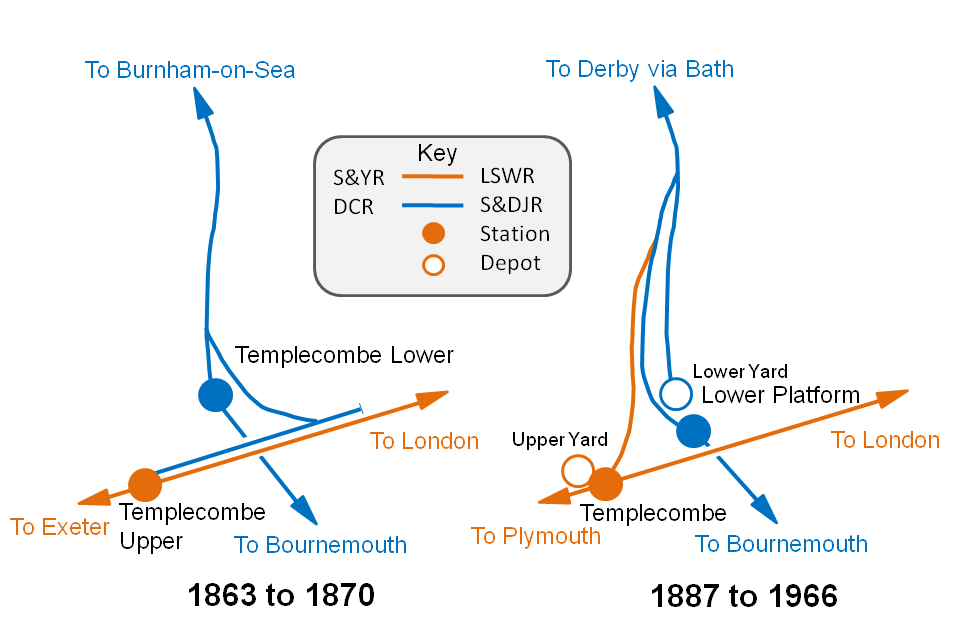
The junction arrangements between the two railway lines changed over the years

The two railway lines were initially linked by a north-to-east curve; trains from the S&DJR reversed and ran along a separate line next to the single-track Templecombe to Gillingham line to reach the Upper station to allow passengers to connect with main line trains. In March 1870 this connection was closed and a new north-to-west curve was opened that brought S&DJR trains directly to a third platform at the Upper station; this allowed the S&YR line to be doubled. A second locomotive was coupled to the back of the train to facilitate the reversals necessary to move the S&DJR trains in and out of the station. In January 1887 the Lower station was closed and replaced by Templecombe Lower Platform a little further south, but since 1867 many S&DJR trains had called only at the Upper station. The original Lower station was absorbed into the goods yard and locomotive depot.

On 20 July 1874 the S&DJR's Bath Extension was opened, connecting it to the Midland Railway at Bath Green Park. This northern connection brought more traffic to Templecombe where interchange could be made with the LSWR network in Wiltshire, Somerset, Devon and Cornwall. A large goods yard was needed to handle this traffic, and it was placed on the north side of the LSWR line to the west of the LSWR (or Upper) station. Goods for the Templecombe area were always handled in a separate goods yard and goods shed on the south side of the line; the main station offices were also on this side of the line.

The LSWR became a part of the Southern Railway in 1923 as a result of the Railways Act 1921. In 1938 the station was modernised, a footbridge replaced the subway and the platforms were extended to cope with trains 14 coaches long. An ambulance train was stationed at Templecombe during World War II and kept in constant readiness to move casualties from ports on the south coast to military hospitals. On 5 September it was needed to treat casualties at Templecombe station itself. Three bombs were dropped while two trains were standing in the station. Five railwaymen and eight passengers were killed, and many more were injured.

Preceding station	Historical railways	Following station
Gillingham line and station open	London and South Western Railway; Salisbury to Exeter line	Milborne Port line open, station closed
Henstridge line and station closed	Somerset & Dorset Joint Railway; LSWR and Midland Railway	Wincanton line and station closed

=== Closure and reopening ===
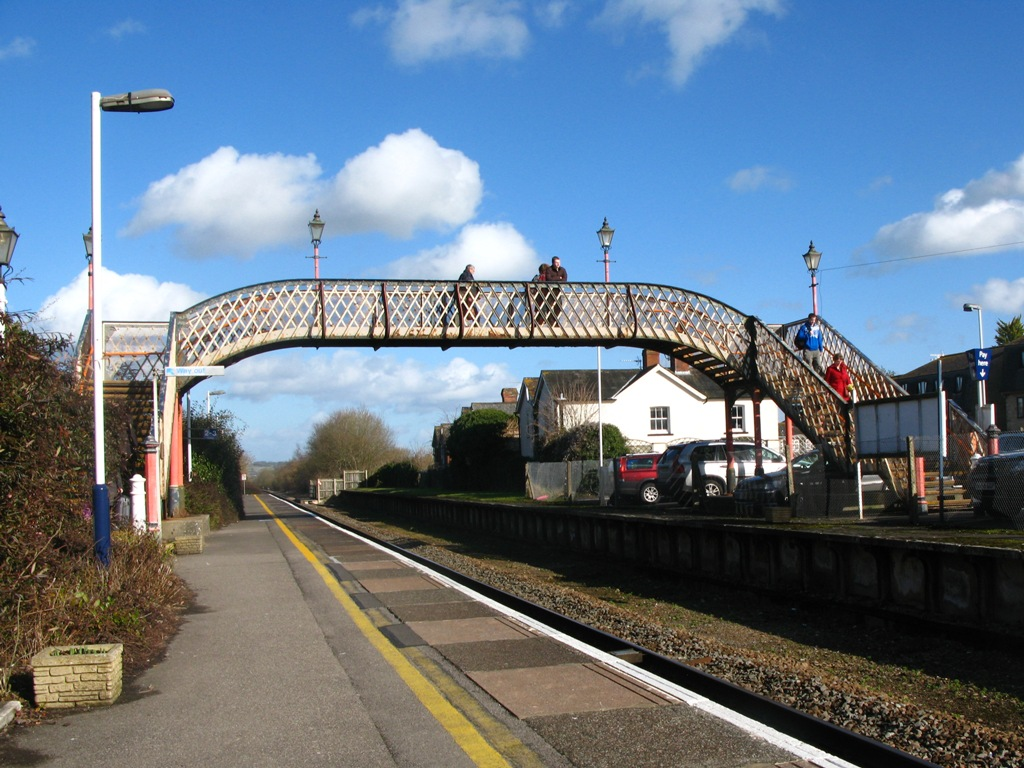
The "new" footbridge which was used from 1983 to 2012 to reach the reopened platform, photo taken in February 2010

In 1948, the Southern Railway was nationalised to become the Southern Region of British Railways. Two years later, the former goods and locomotive facilities were rationalised. All locomotives were concentrated in the Lower yard, and goods traffic was exclusively handled in the Upper yard. 1958 saw the S&DJR line north of Templecombe transferred to the Western Region, and in 1963 all lines west of Wilton South followed. Following these changes, most trains were transferred to other routes. Goods traffic at Templecombe ceased on 5 April 1965 and the Lower Platform was closed on 3 January 1966. The S&DJR route was closed on 7 March 1966 along with the Upper station. The station buildings were demolished in 1968, but the signal box was retained, and from April 1967, the line from Templecombe to Gillingham reverted to a single track.

The first suggestion of reopening the station came in 1975, and Somerset County Council carried out a survey of people living in and around the village to establish whether such a move would be supported by area residents. The results were encouraging, and an approach was later made to British Rail. In 1978, the council stated that £12,000 a year would be needed to subsidise the service, a figure that it could not then afford. The local community formed the Templecombe Station Working Committee (TSWC) to campaign for the reopening. On 5 September 1982, the TSWC arranged for a train to Paignton to call to test the demand for a service, and 270 passengers bought tickets. More trains were called on an experimental basis, and tickets were sold for a total of 2,273 passengers. Each time a train called at the station, it had to be staffed by members of the TSWC, and temporary lighting had to be provided if they called when it was dark.

It was finally agreed that the station could be reopened on a three-year trial. The cost of works was kept to just £9,200 by TSWC members carrying out much of the work themselves. Reopening came on 3 October 1983. The services proved so successful that a new waiting shelter was provided in 1988, and an extension with toilets was added two years later. A 'new' footbridge was erected to connect the platform with the car park; it had originally been erected in 1893 at Buxted. The signal box doubles as a ticket office, and for many years the station was staffed full-time because of the need for a member of staff to operate the points and signals for the double track west of the station. After the commissioning of a new signalling system, controlled from Basingstoke, in March 2012, ticket office staffing hours were reduced. However, because the platform was only accessible by crossing the track, staff were still required to operate a level crossing for wheelchair users and other passengers unable to use the footbridge. To resolve this, the disused platform on the south side, where there is level access to the car park and streets beyond, was extended out across the disused trackbed up to the active set of tracks, and was provided with a basic shelter and lighting, an automatic ticket machine, and information boards.

=== Signal boxes ===
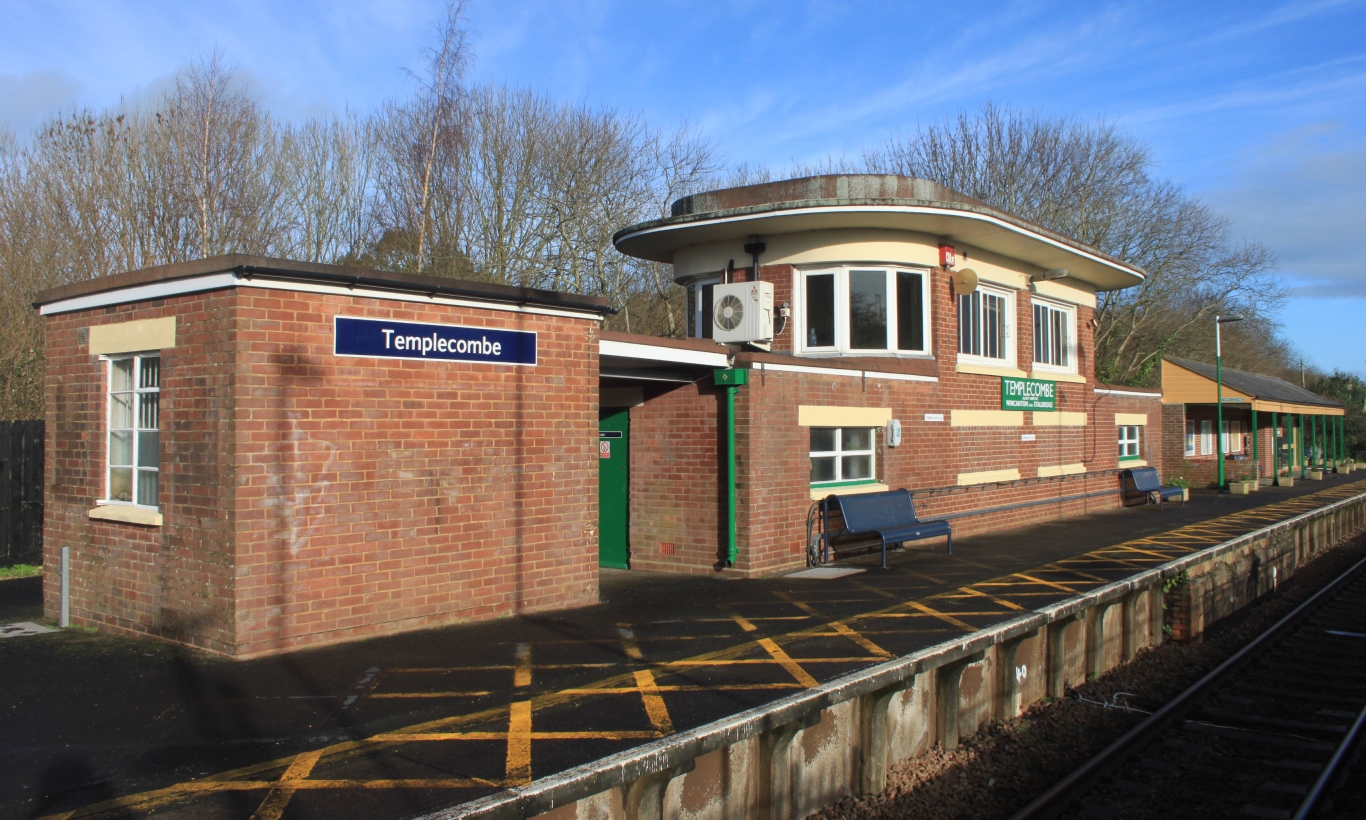
The signal box used from May 1938 until March 2012, photo taken in December 2015

Points and signals were initially controlled from the trackside, but eventually five signal boxes controlled movements:

- Templecombe A – Upper station L&SWR opened in 1875
- Templecombe B – Upper station S&DJR
- Templecombe No 3 Junction — junction between the original S&DJR main line to the north and the new 1870 spur to the Upper station
- Templecombe No 2 Junction — junction between the new spur to the Upper station and a link back down to the S&DJR main line
- Templecombe No 1 Junction – junction between the link line from No 2 Junction and the S&DJR main line and the south.

The No 1 Junction box was closed in 1887 and after that the former S&DJR main line between it and No 3 Junction became a dead-end, accessed only from No 3 Junction and serving the S&DJR loco shed and lower yard. In 1933, the B box was closed and the frame in the A box was altered (and possibly extended) to control the S&DJR movements. In the same year the No 3 Junction box was closed and its functions transferred to the No 2 Junction box, in which the lever-frame was extended.

A new 60-lever signal box was provided a few years later at the Upper station as part of the station modernisation, opening on 15 May 1938. It was situated at the west end of the Up platform where the signalman had a good view of the goods yards and the junction between the S&DJR platform and the main lines. When the station was closed the box was retained, and from 1967 it controlled the end-on junction between the single track to Gillingham, and the double track to Yeovil Junction, with its lever-frame being shortened to just 16 levers. When the station reopened a part of the box was modified to act as a ticket office with a single member of staff acting as both signal operator and ticket office clerk. Signalling on the line between Salisbury and Exeter was modernised in 2011/12 and a system for controlling the line remotely at the main Basingstoke Rail Operating Centre was installed. This was commissioned in February and March 2012 and the line's redundant signal boxes were decommissioned.

=== Locomotive sheds ===
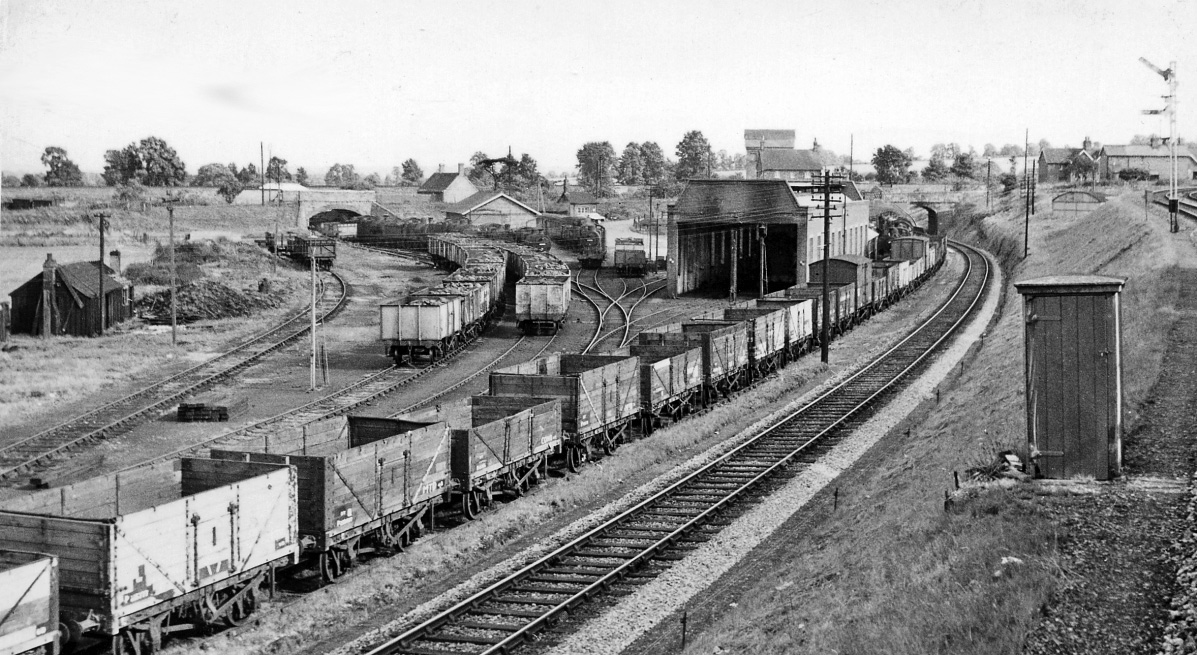
S&DJR locomotive shed in July 1962

The first locomotive shed was opened by the Dorset Central Railway by the Lower station in 1863. This was also used by the LSWR until they opened their own shed in the Upper yard in 1867. The LSWR shed had been demolished by 1936 but locomotives were still kept here until 1950, out based from Yeovil Town. The S&DJR shed had in the meantime been enlarged and took over responsibility for all locomotives in the area until it too closed in 1966.

The S&DJR shed had a 50 feet (15 m) turntable. Its allocation was typically about 15 locomotives, with an 82G shed code in Western Region days.

== Description and facilities ==
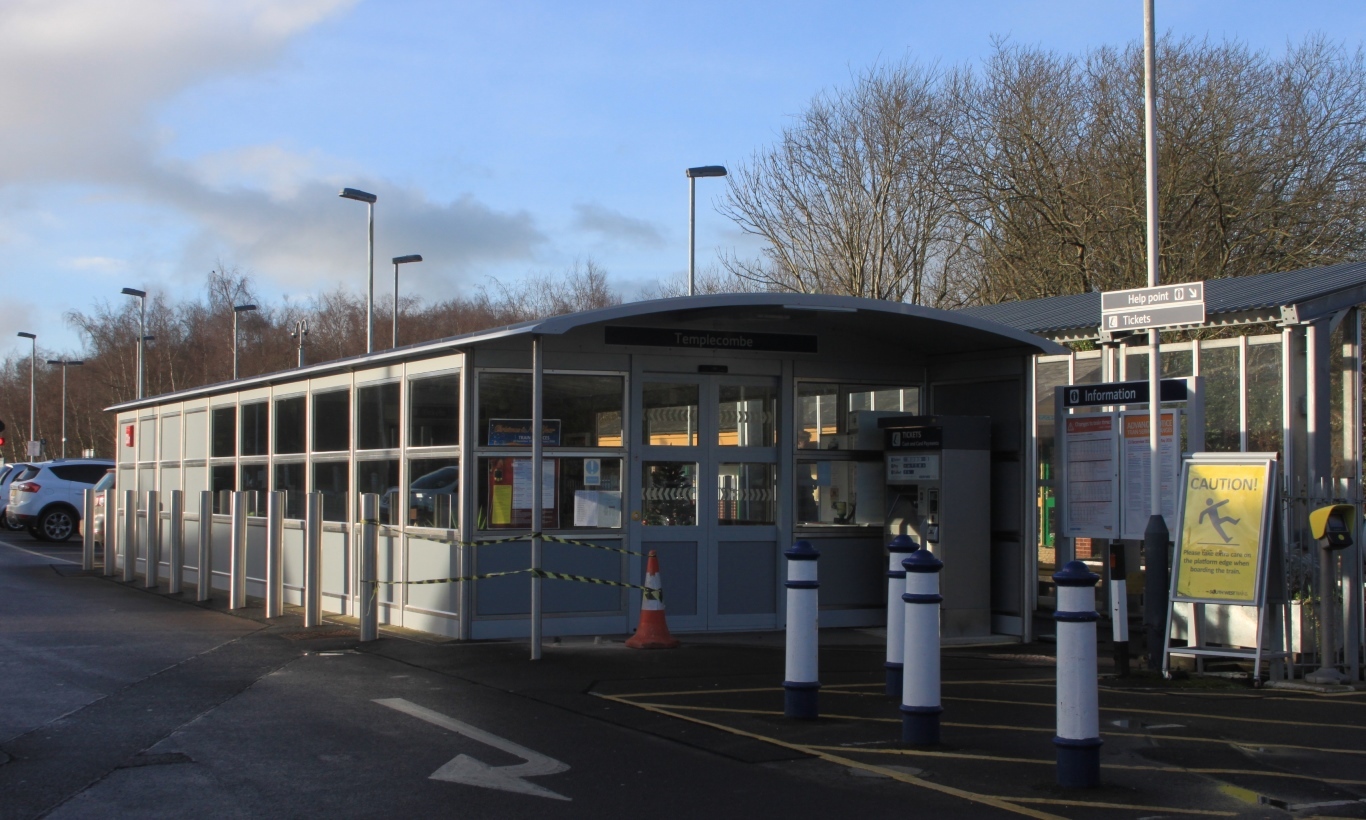
The ticket office built in 2012, photo taken in December 2015

The station has two platforms, one on each side of a single track, but only the platform on the south side of the line is open to passengers. The platform on the north side of the line is no longer in use for passengers. A footbridge connects the two platforms but has a locked gate to prevent public access. The opposite side of this platform is where the S&DJR trains to Bath and Bournemouth used to reverse after connecting with trains on the Exeter to London line. The area once occupied by the large Upper Yard beyond the signal box is now overgrown by trees.

The platform on the south side, which is still in use for passengers, has a ticket office and a shelter and is adjacent to the car park.

== Services ==
South Western Railway operate hourly services to London Waterloo and Exeter St Davids.

Preceding station	National Rail	Following station
Gillingham	South Western Railway; West of England Main Line	Sherborne

== Locomotives named Templecombe ==
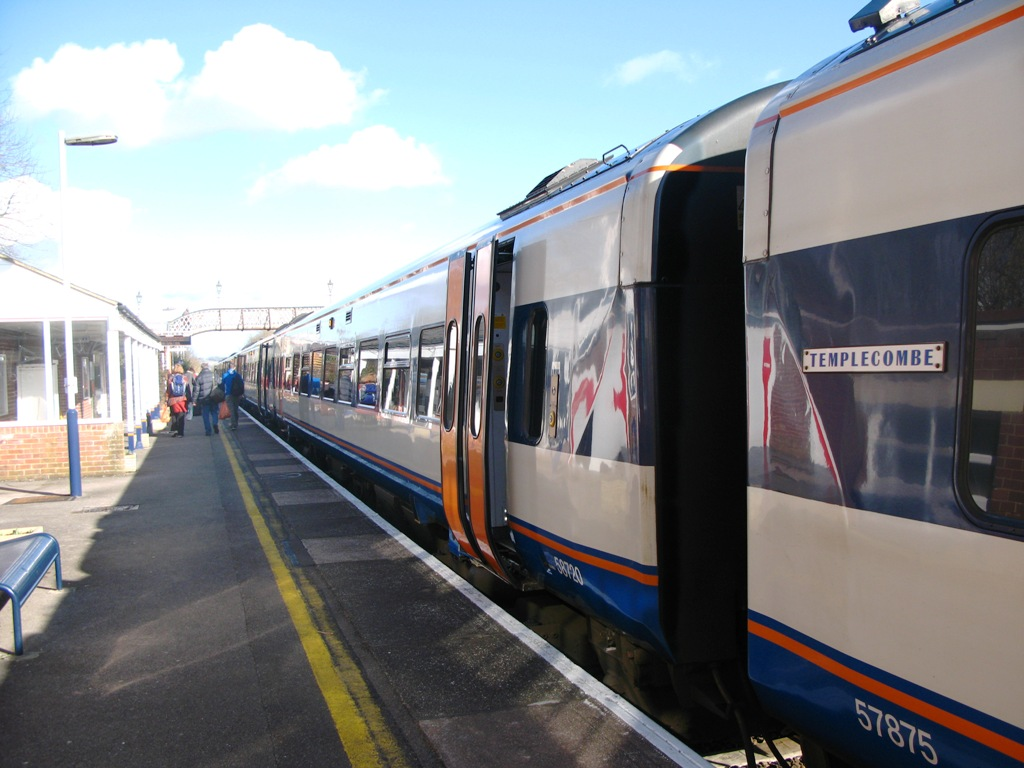
159003 Templecombe calls at Templecombe station in February 2010

The first locomotive to carry the Templecombe name was a West Country Class 4-6-2 steam locomotive number 34098. It was built at Brighton in 1949 but, despite its West Country name, spent most of its early years working from Brighton or Ramsgate. In later years it was allocated to Exmouth Junction and would have been seen regularly on trains through its named town. It was withdrawn in June 1967.

The next locomotive to receive the name was Class 33 Bo-Bo diesel-electric number 33112. This was named at Templecombe on 17 October 1987. The name was then transferred to Class 47 Co-Co number 47708 in June 1991. Both these locomotives worked passenger trains on the line.

When locomotive-hauled trains were replaced by Class 159 three-car diesel multiple units new Templecombe nameplates were fitted to 57875, the centre car of unit 159003, in a ceremony at the station on 3 October 1993.

== See also ==
- Southern Railway routes west of Salisbury

== Bibliography ==
- "Templecombe is Best Station". RAIL. No. 90. EMAP National Publications. 12 February – 8 March 1989. p. 6. ISSN 0953-4563. OCLC 49953699.
