= Wilton South railway station =

Former railway station in England

Wilton South
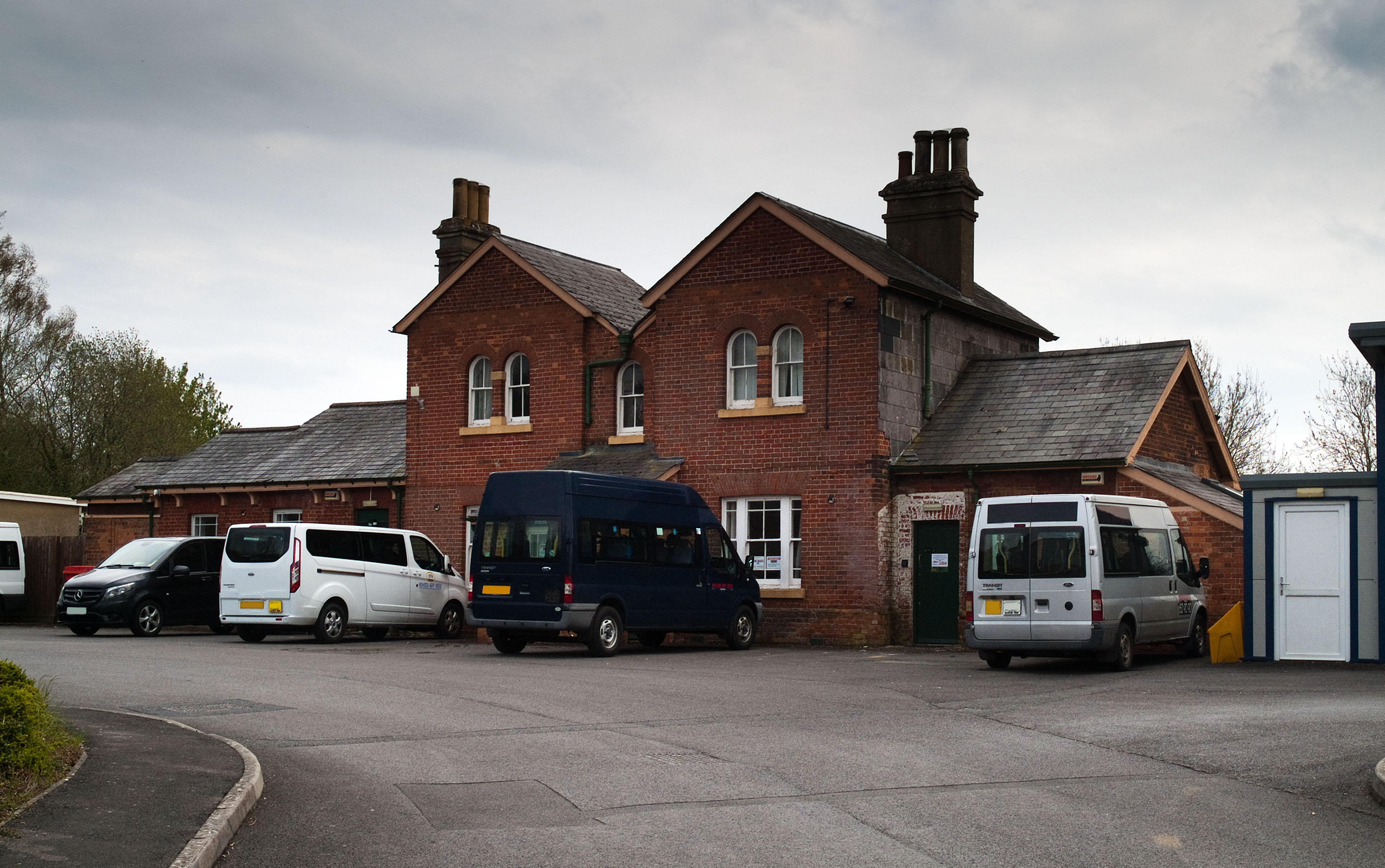
- Former station building in 2023

General information
- Location: Wilton, Wiltshire; England
- Coordinates: 51.08529°N 1.85827°W
- Grid reference: SU100317
- Platforms: 2

Other information
- Status: Disused

History
- Original company: Salisbury and Yeovil Railway
- Pre-grouping: London and South Western Railway
- Post-grouping: Southern Railway

Key dates
- 1859: Opened
- 1966: Closed
Location

Wilton South railway station is a disused railway station which served Wilton in Wiltshire, England, on the West of England line from London Waterloo to Exeter.

It was opened in 1859 as Wilton railway station. The Great Western Railway opened a station nearby in 1856 on its Salisbury branch from Westbury, and in 1949 the stations were renamed Wilton South and Wilton North respectively.

The station closed in 1966 although the line remains open.

== History ==
Wilton station was opened with the first section of the Salisbury and Yeovil Railway on 2 May 1859. At first just used for passenger traffic, goods were also handled from 1 September the next year. The Salisbury and Yeovil Railway was amalgamated into the London and South Western Railway (LSWR) in 1878. In 1923 the LSWR became part of the Southern Railway, which in turn was nationalised in 1948 to become the Southern Region of British Railways.

This was the second station in Wilton, the Great Western Railway (GWR) having opened one on their adjacent route in 1856. To avoid confusion between the two, this station became 'Wilton South' in September 1949, and at the same time the former GWR station became "Wilton North". The North station closed to passengers in 1955 but goods continued to be handled there until 1965. In the meantime, at the South station goods traffic ceased on 6 July 1964 and passenger services were withdrawn on 7 March 1966. The station was used for passengers a few times in the 1970s during engineering works.

Fast expresses such as the Devon Belle that were not scheduled to stop at nearby Salisbury sometimes changed locomotives here so as to avoid congestion at Salisbury. The stop was not advertised in the timetables and passengers could not join or alight from trains at Wilton.

== Signalling ==
A signal box was provided at the east end of the eastbound platform, and was kept in use after the station closed as the line westwards was single. Alterations saw control of the area transferred to Salisbury signal box and later to Basingstoke ASC. Now redundant, the box was taken down and rebuilt at Medstead and Four Marks on the Mid Hants Railway.

== Description ==
The main station buildings, including a house for the station master and the signal box, were on what was the northern platform, which was served by trains towards Salisbury and London. A footbridge linked this with the now demolished westbound platform where there was a smaller shelter for passengers. A goods yard was on the north side of the line at the Salisbury end of the station.

== Services ==
The station was served by trains on the London Waterloo to Exeter line.

Preceding station	Historical railways	Following station
Salisbury	London and South Western Railway; West of England Main Line	Dinton

== See also ==
- Southern Railway routes west of Salisbury
