= Southern Railway routes west of Salisbury =

The Southern Railway routes west of Salisbury were built by the London and South Western Railway (LSWR) and allied companies, which all became part of the Southern Railway in 1923. The railway arrived at Salisbury in 1847 but was extended westwards through the counties of Somerset, Devon and Cornwall and established an alternative to the route from London to the west built by the Great Western Railway (GWR) and its associated companies.

== Network ==
The first route to Salisbury was from Southampton in 1847. By 1857 there was a direct line from London Waterloo, 84 miles away, and in 1859 this extended towards Yeovil via the GWR station in Fisherton.

From Salisbury the main line continued broadly west, passing no major population centre until reaching Exeter. The difficult terrain, with numerous hills and valleys crossing the direction of the route, made selection of the alignment difficult, and several medium-sized towns were passed at a distance of a few miles. Many of these towns had to accept a horse omnibus connection from a remote station on the main line; later, some of them—Yeovil, Chard, Lyme Regis, Seaton, Sidmouth and Exmouth—gained their own branch line.

At Exeter, the LSWR had its own station, Queen Street, more conveniently situated than the St Davids station of the Bristol & Exeter Railway (B&ER), but its elevated location made onward extension into west Devon difficult. When it eventually did so, it descended by a steep and curved connection into the B&ER station, running a few miles northward on that line and then diverging to the west, to Crediton. The line onward led into several main line branches: to Barnstaple and Bideford (and later Ilfracombe); to Halwill and Holsworthy, with Halwill itself becoming a junction later; and to Plymouth, reached at first over part of the route of the rival broad gauge interest.

== Securing territory ==
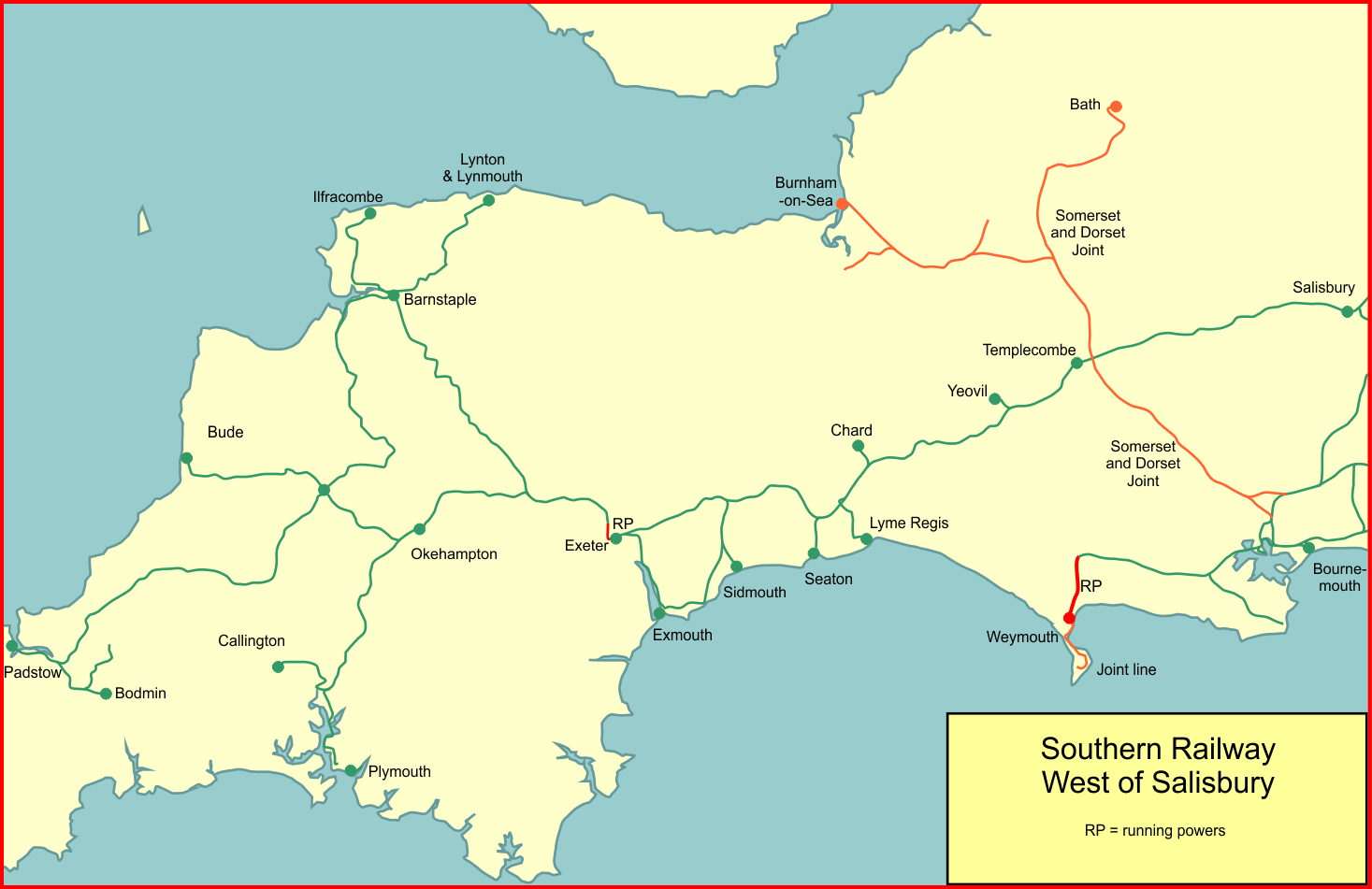
Map of the Southern Railway routes in the West of England

The London and South Western Railway (LSWR) was formed from the London and Southampton Railway, one of the earliest long-distance lines, which opened from 1838. The first line was successful, and the company then extended its network, at first by building branch lines from the original main line, and then by building new lines. Securing territory, by building a route to "capture" an area quickly became an objective as a part of growing the company's business, and it was a natural consequence that this developed into a competitive battle with companies whose territory lay adjacent.

This competition developed especially fiercely with the Great Western Railway (GWR). This company had opened its main line from London to Bristol in 1838, and developed alliances that extended its influence to Exeter. Most of the railways being built at that time used the standard track gauge (the spacing between the rails) of 1,435 mm (4 ft 8 1/2 in), but the GWR used a broad gauge of 7 ft (2,134 mm). (Note: GWER broad gauge lines were converted to standard gauge by 1892.)

Often new railways in a locality were promoted by local interests, often wishing their line to be worked, or purchased, by one of the larger companies. Operation would be inconvenient if it were built to the gauge used by the rival, and the choice of gauge had to be made when seeking parliamentary authority for the construction. That choice implied—perhaps forced—alignment to one or other of the larger prospective parents. This led to the competition being characterised as the "gauge war".

As the territory in the counties near London became saturated, thoughts of expansion turned to the relatively undeveloped west of England. The GWR and the Bristol & Exeter Railway working in partnership had formed a through route from London to Exeter in 1844, and with the South Devon Railway was to reach Plymouth (Note: Temporarily at Laira until a permanent station was opened a year later.) in 1848; the three companies formed the powerful "broad gauge alliance".

The broad gauge route to Exeter ran via Bristol, leaving much territory as yet unsecured, and despite the agreement, the LSWR determined to build a line to Exeter. But although it had reached Salisbury, this was a branch line from Bishopstoke (Eastleigh), and Exeter was 88 miles away.

== Development of LSWR routes ==
=== Salisbury first ===
On 17 January 1847, the first LSWR goods train, headed by the locomotive Rhinoceros entered the Salisbury station, at Milford at the south-eastern edge of the city. This event was hugely significant to the city, bringing the possibility of industrial development, so that "Salisbury might become the Manchester of the South".

Under the guidance of W J Chaplin, Company Chairman from 1843, the LSWR had been dealing with the demands of Southampton and Portsmouth, and it had neglected the clamour for railway connection from towns and cities to the west. An energetic solicitor from Wimborne, A L Castleman, had developed a scheme for a railway from Southampton to Dorchester, with the possibility of extending westward from Dorchester to Exeter and beyond. His line was so full of curves and diversions that it was called "the water snake" or "Castleman's Corkscrew". His discussions with the LSWR were so forceful that the company rebuffed him, and he turned to the GWR as an ally. The GWR welcomed him and agreed to lease the line, when built, on good terms, as it would give the GWR access to Southampton.

Meanwhile, there were competing attempts by the GWR and the LSWR to reach Newbury, and this led to a determination by a Board of Trade committee in favour of the GWR route. But an agreement was forged between the GWR and the LSWR: the GWR would relinquish any encouragement of Castleman's line, in return for which the LSWR agreed not to promote any competing lines westward of Salisbury or Dorchester; the agreement was signed on 16 January 1845.

Castleman got his company, called the Southampton and Dorchester Railway, incorporated and the line between Southampton and Dorchester via Ringwood and Wimborne opened on 1 June 1847. The Southampton and Dorchester was amalgamated with the LSWR by Act of 22 July 1848, effective on 11 October 1848.

Now the Railway Mania was in full spate, with a frenzied promotion of railways everywhere, and three schemes to reach Exeter were presented in Parliament in 1847. Two were approved, including the LSWR scheme which would have provided a direct line between Basingstoke and Salisbury as well as reaching westwards, but suddenly the financial bubble had burst, and the LSWR and its competitors found that money was too scarce to permit building new railways. It was not until 1 May 1857 that the direct line from Basingstoke to Salisbury was opened, also to the Milford station: a connection from there to the present-day Salisbury station, involving a tunnel, followed on 2 May 1859.

=== Salisbury to Yeovil ===
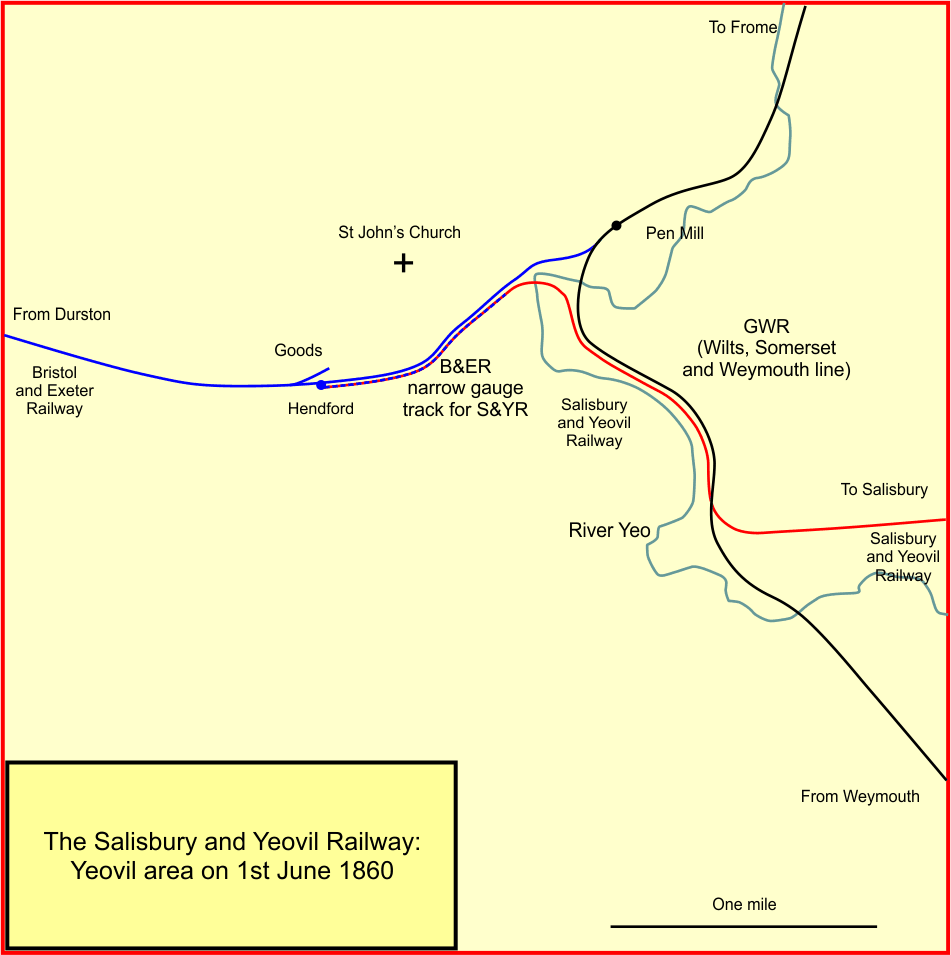
The Salisbury and Yeovil Railway arrives at Hendford

The truce created by the agreement over the Southampton and Dorchester line required the LSWR not to promote a line westward of that line. This agreement proved to be much regretted: now the GWR promoted the Wilts, Somerset and Weymouth Railway, already by 1851 reaching Salisbury and Frome, and building onwards to Dorchester and Weymouth.

In 1853 the directors of the company proposed a scheme to extend from Dorchester to Exeter, having been encouraged by declarations from the military that communications across the country without a break of gauge were strategically important; but at a special meeting of the proprietors on 15 November 1853, the proposals were rejected.

In 1854, the independent Salisbury and Yeovil Railway (S&YR) company got its Act of Parliament (on 7 August) to build from Salisbury to join the GWR and B&ER, both of which were already in Yeovil. It was not until 21 July 1856 that the LSWR Coastal Scheme (reaching Exeter via Dorchester) was dropped.

The first section of the S&YR opened from Salisbury to Gillingham on 2 May 1859. The Salisbury station was a new construction at Fisherton Street, opened the same day, immediately south of the GWR station that had opened on 20 June 1856 to serve the line from Westbury. On the same day the LSWR opened connecting lines from the Bishopstoke and Basingstoke lines to Fisherton Street, and closed the Milford station to passengers.

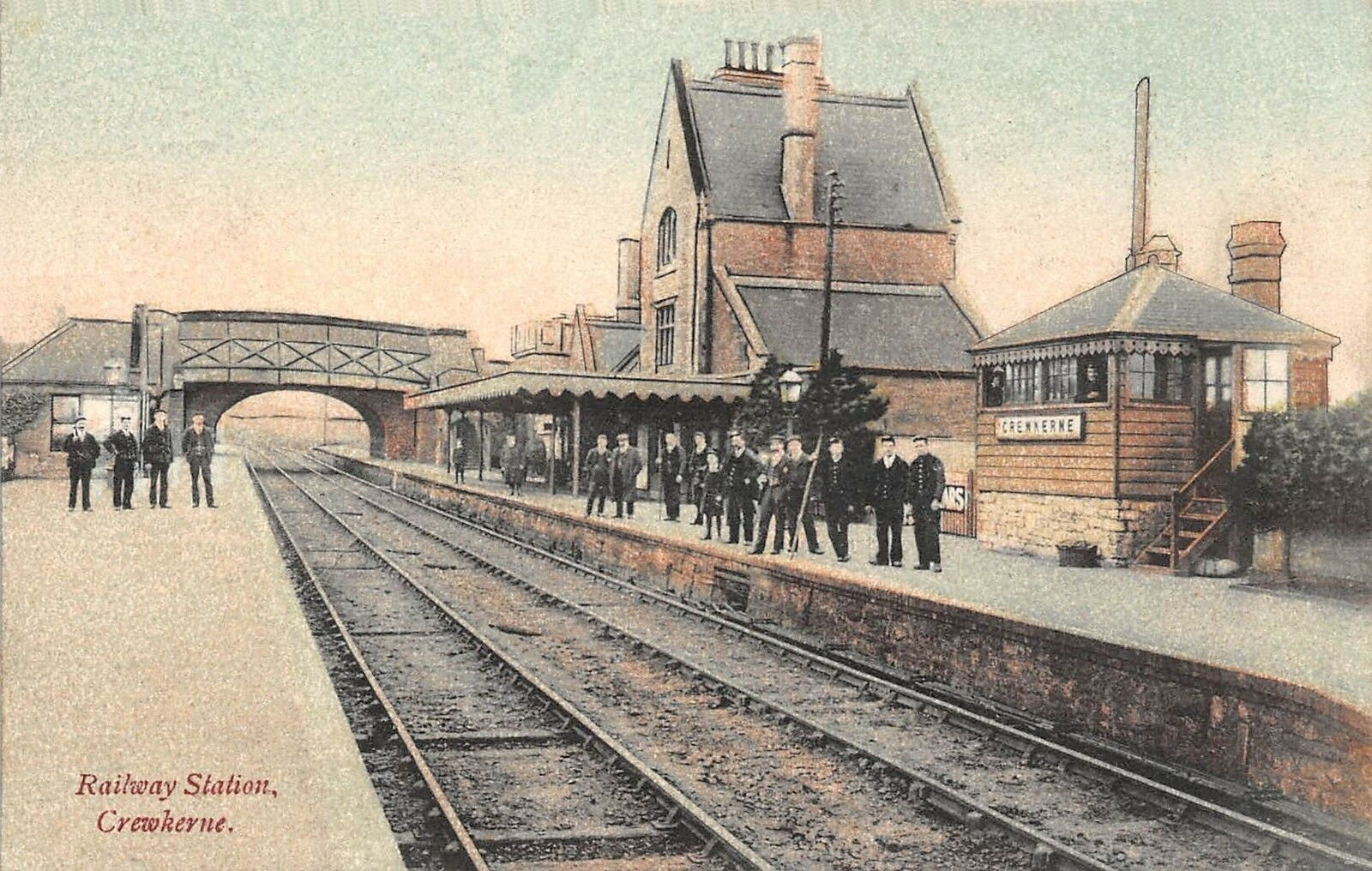
Crewkerne railway station, about 1905

The Salisbury & Yeovil company extended its line to Sherborne on 7 May 1860, and from there to Yeovil on 1 June 1860 (to passengers; goods on 1 September). The Yeovil station was the Bristol and Exeter Railway station at Hendford, up until then the terminus of their line from Durston. The two companies planned a joint station which became Yeovil Town, and the B&ER made a separate narrow gauge track from the point of junction to Hendford, providing mixed gauge track in their goods yard there.

== From Yeovil to Exeter ==
When the S&YR had been authorised and the Coastal Scheme abandoned, the course of the LSWR route to Exeter was clear, and they now easily got an Act for the line on 21 July 1856. Construction was swift, and the line opened throughout from Yeovil to Exeter Queen Street on 19 July 1860—seven weeks after the opening of the S&YR. The Bristol & Exeter Railway, a broad gauge company, had reached Exeter 16 years previously.

The LSWR line made a junction with the S&YR—in reality simply a continuation of the main line—at Bradford Abbas, and built a station called Yeovil Junction, and a connecting line from the Hendford line, forming a triangle. The LSWR worked the S&YR line from the outset. (Note: The LSWR acquired the SYR in July 1878) The main line from Salisbury to Exeter Queen Street was single throughout, with intermediate crossing stations at Wilton, Dinton, Tisbury, Semley, Gillingham, Templecombe, Milborne Port, Sherborne, Yeovil Junction, Sutton Bingham, Crewkerne, Chard Road, Axminster, Colyton, Honiton, Feniton, Whimple, and Broad Clyst.

The route traversed difficult terrain, with most river valleys running transverse to its direction, so that gradients were significant, 1 in 80 being typical. Nonetheless only three tunnels were needed: Buckhorn Weston (sometimes known as Gillingham Tunnel, 742 yards long, two miles west of Gillingham; Crewkerne (206 yards, a mile west of Crewkerne station) and Honiton (at 1,345 yards the longest on the LSWR system, two miles west of Honiton). Due to the difficulty of the landscape, the line passed by most of the important towns in the area, and this led to the eventual construction of several branch lines to bring railways to the towns.

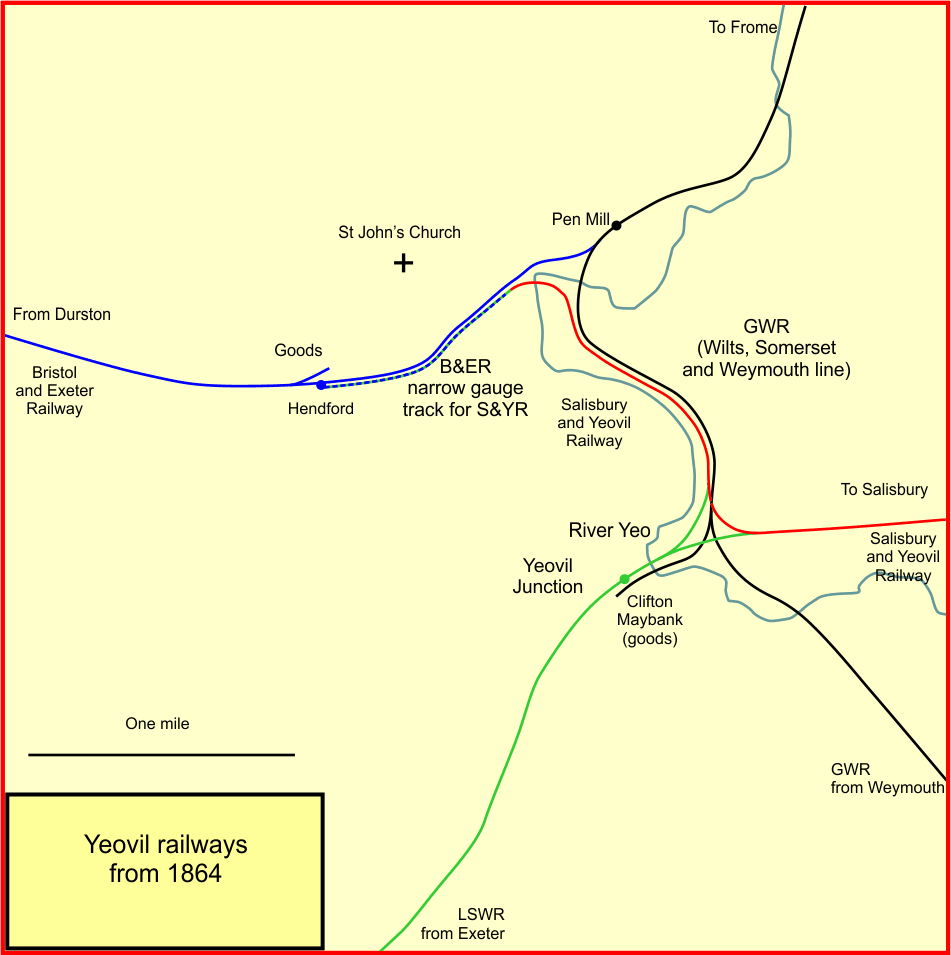
Yeovil after the opening of the LSWR

Yeovil Town station opened on 1 June 1861, and LSWR passenger trains ceased to run on to Hendford; goods trains continued to use the yard there. In 1860 there were four passenger trains each way between Salisbury and Exeter, and at least one each way ran via Hendford, using the Bradford Abbas curve between the Salisbury line and Hendford, with others having a connecting shuttle from the Junction station.

The siding accommodation at Hendford was very cramped, and to facilitate goods exchange traffic, the GWR built a short goods branch line to Yeovil Junction from the Weymouth line. This was officially referred to as the Clifton Maybank Siding and opened on 13 June 1864. It was broad gauge and there was no common siding accommodation; the exchange was by transhipping the goods.

The east curve was closed on 1 January 1870, after which trains from Salisbury to Yeovil Town reversed at Yeovil Junction. On 1 July 1870, the entire line between Salisbury and Exeter was doubled.

== Exeter and North Devon ==
The LSWR was building a line to a station central to the city, at Queen Street, but westward extension seemed to be blocked by the Bristol and Exeter Railway (B&ER) and South Devon Railway (SDR) line, which ran north–south on the low-lying ground below it. However an agreement was made with the broad gauge companies on 14 March 1860 to extend the line from Queen Street down to the St Davids station; the B&ER would lay mixed gauge at the station and on to Cowley Bridge Junction, where the Crediton line diverged. The B&ER agreed to facilitate the operation of LSWR trains with minimal restrictions, but there was a provision that the LSWR had to stop every passenger train at St Davids station.

The line descended to St Davids at the exceptionally steep gradient of 1 in 37, with a 184-yard tunnel, and special precautions were taken in operation on this incline. The connecting line cost £19,550 and it was opened on 1 February 1862.

Long before this, seeing a strategic advantage in developing territory in Devon, the LSWR took a great interest in local railways being promoted between Exeter and North Devon. When the Taw Vale Extension Railway (TVER) was promoted and obtained its Act of Parliament for construction in 1846, the LSWR bought shares in the adjacent Exeter and Crediton Railway (E&CR), and in 1847 the LSWR concluded a lease of the TVER which itself leased the E&CR. When the lines finally opened on 1 August 1854 the LSWR had control of a railway from Exeter to Fremington, just beyond Barnstaple. However, these had been required by the Board of Trade to be on the broad gauge, and the LSWR did not have broad gauge rolling stock, so for some time the Company had to arrange for the Bristol & Exeter Railway to work its trains for it. After the LSWR reached Exeter, an arbitration award required the Bristol & Exeter to lay mixed gauge track from Exeter St Davids to Cowley Bridge Junction: the point of divergence of the North Devon lines from the B&ER main line. This permitted the LSWR to run standard gauge trains to Crediton from 1862, and throughout to Fremington from 1863.

The Bideford Extension Railway built a line from Fremington to Bideford, opened in 1855, worked by the LSWR on the broad gauge with B&ER trains until 1863.

The LSWR extended the Bideford line to Torrington, after local pressure to fulfil an earlier undertaking, opening in 1872.

Extension of the line from Barnstaple to Ilfracombe took place in 1874. The route was very difficult and involved steep gradients and sharp curves.

== Into Cornwall and to Plymouth ==
Seeking further westward expansion, the LSWR encouraged an independent company, the Devon and Cornwall Railway, to promote a line from Coleford Junction, north-west of Crediton, to Lydford (at first spelt Lidford,) round the northern edge of Dartmoor. At Lydford the line made a junction with the South Devon & Tavistock Railway, a broad gauge company that had reached there in 1865, and running powers were obtained to continue to Plymouth. The D&CR line was opened slowly in stages between 1865 and 1874, and the completion was accompanied by the opening of the LSWR's own terminus station at Devonport; its trains ran through Plymouth from Tavistock Junction, making a Plymouth call at Mutley station and later North Road station, then continuing to the Devonport station. Goods traffic was dealt with at Friary station, on the south-east side of Plymouth.

This reliance on a competing company's line—one which had never been intended as a main line—was unsatisfactory, and the LSWR encouraged the formation of an independent company, the Plymouth, Devonport and South Western Junction Railway (PD&SWJR), which was formed to build an independent line from Lydford to Plymouth. The PD&SWJR obtained its authorising Act on 25 August 1883 for a line from Lydford passing to the west of Tavistock, then down the valley of the River Tamar to reach Plymouth. In 1889 the idea of a central station in Plymouth was abandoned in favour of running to Devonport and converting Friary to a passenger terminus. The PD&SWJR line opened on 2 June 1890 and this changed Devonport into a through station. A new curve allowing trains from Devonport to run directly to Friary was brought into use on 1 April 1891, and Friary became the Plymouth passenger terminal for the LSWR. Trains to London started from Friary and ran through Plymouth from east to west, calling at North Road, and continuing westwards through Devonport before heading north alongside the Tamar.

The Lydford line enabled the LSWR to launch a railway to Holsworthy, an important market town, in 1879, extending that line to the Cornish harbour town of Bude in 1898.

== Branch Lines between Salisbury and Exeter ==
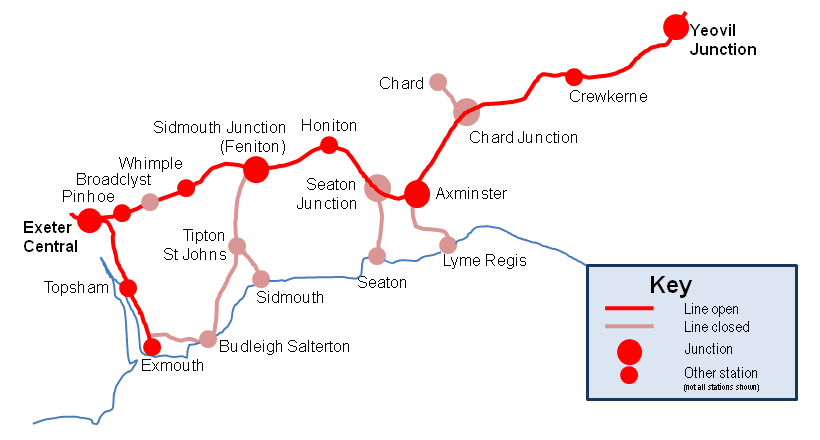
Map of the branch lines

The challenging terrain between Salisbury and Exeter made it difficult for the main line as constructed to serve several important towns near its path. This resulted in several important branch lines being constructed to serve them, in many cases promoted by local interests. Most of the branch lines made a junction with the main line at a place other than a town, reducing the commercial effectiveness of the route.

Even the Salisbury and Yeovil Railway served Yeovil itself by a branch from Bradford Abbas, a fact which lost it much initial support in Yeovil when it became known at the promotion stage.

When the Yeovil branch opened, on the same day as the S&YR main line on 1 June 1860, the Yeovil station was not ready and the trains continued on the Bristol & Exeter line to Hendford, the B&ER station on the western limits of the town. The B&ER laid mixed gauge track for the purpose, having reached there in 1857 connecting with the GWR at Pen Mill. The magnificent Yeovil joint station opened on 1 June 1861, jointly operated by the B&ER, the GWR and the LSWR, and the LSWR trains ceased running through to Hendford.

Chard was served by a railway promoted by the Chard Railway company; when construction was partly complete the LSWR purchased the railway on 1 January 1863 and the line opened on 8 May 1863, from Chard Road to Chard Town. When the Bristol & Exeter Railway reached Chard from Taunton in 1866, the LSWR line was extended, by-passing the original station and running to a new Joint station, called New Chard or "Chard Joint", opened on 26 November 1866. The original station remained open, but was reduced to goods-only status in 1917.

Lyme Regis was the last of the intermediate branches to be built after several earlier schemes from 1864 failed; the Lyme Regis branch line ran from Axminster station with 1 in 40 gradients and sharp curves, opening on 24 August 1903. Constructed and worked by the Axminster and Lyme Regis Light Railway, it was absorbed by the LSWR on 1 January 1907. Although a southwards branch, it ran from the up (north) side of Axminster station and crossed over the main line. There was a spur to the down sidings at Axminster station.

The Seaton branch was constructed by the Seaton and Beer Railway; it opened on 16 March 1868 from Colyton Junction (later Seaton Junction) with intermediate stations at Colyton Town, Colyford and Seaton. The line was leased by the LSWR from 1 January 1880 and absorbed by it on 1 January 1888.

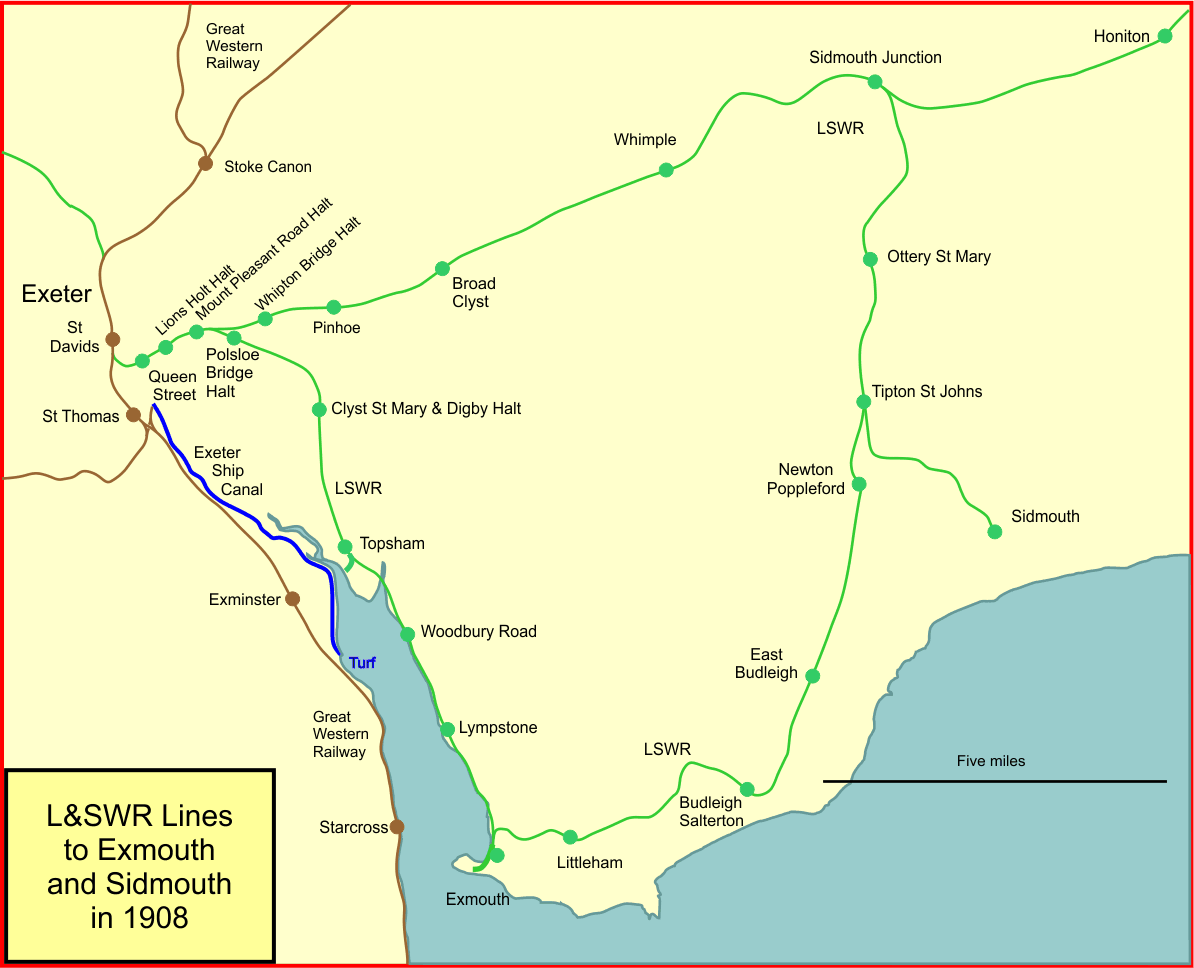
Exmouth and Sidmouth branches in 1908

The Sidmouth Railway got its Act of Parliament on 29 June 1871 and opened its line on 6 July 1874 from Feniton, with intermediate stations at Tipton and Ottery St Mary. The Sidmouth station was somewhat short of the town itself. Feniton had been renamed Ottery Road in 1861, but was renamed Sidmouth Junction when the Sidmouth line opened. (After closure of the branch line it reverted to Feniton in 1971).

A light railway called the Budleigh Salterton Railway got its Act on 20 July 1894 and opened its line in 1897 from Tipton St Johns (the earlier Tipton station, renamed in 1881) to Salterton, with an intermediate station at Budleigh. In 1898 it renamed Salterton to be called Budleigh Salterton; Budleigh was renamed East Budleigh, and a new station was opened at Newton Poppleford.

The LSWR already operated an Exmouth branch, and it filled in the gap by opening its Exmouth & Salterton Railway from Budleigh Salterton to Exmouth, with an intermediate station at Littleham, on 1 June 1903.

Much earlier, the Exeter & Exmouth Railway had opened its line from the LSWR at Exmouth Junction on 1 May 1861; it was worked from the outset by the LSWR.

== Independent railways ==
There were three other lines in Devon and Cornwall that were associated with the LSWR or its successor the Southern Railway.

The Plymouth, Devonport and South Western Junction Railway (PD&SWJR) was responsible for the construction of the line between Lydford and Devonport; on completion, it leased that line to the LSWR and took no role in its operation. However, it also constructed a branch line from Bere Alston to Callington, partly constructed over the earlier East Cornwall Mineral Railway line. The branch line was operated by the Company, which remained independent until nationalisation of the railways under the Transport Act 1947.

The Lynton and Barnstaple Railway was a narrow gauge line joining the coast resort of Lynton to the market town of Barnstaple. It opened in May 1898, using the track gauge of 1 ft 11½ in (597 mm). It was not commercially successful; it was absorbed into the Southern Railway group at the grouping of the railways in 1923, but it closed in September 1935.

The North Devon and Cornwall Junction Light Railway opened on 27 July 1925, after narrow gauge mineral tramways built to serve the china clay industry were upgraded. The line remained independent until the nationalisation of the railways in 1948.

=== The Somerset & Dorset Joint Railway ===
The Somerset & Dorset Joint Railway (S&DR) formed a most important connecting line for the LSWR, intersecting at Templecombe. The line had originally been promoted by a local line, the Dorset Central Railway, which started from the LSWR's Southampton–Dorchester line at Wimborne and had made a connection with the LSWR at Templecombe in 1862. At the same time, the line amalgamated with the Somerset Central Railway to form the Somerset & Dorset Railway, at this stage only aspiring to connect the port of Poole with Burnham-on-Sea on the Bristol Channel. However, the little company completed its extension to Bath Green Park in 1874, there connecting with the Midland Railway, and instantly forming an important through route to the Midlands and the North, avoiding dependence on the Great Western Railway.

However the capital expenditure in building the Bath extension ruined the S&DR, and it leased its line to the LSWR and Midland Railway companies in 1876; they operated the line as the Somerset & Dorset Joint Railway, with the Midland company providing the engine power and rolling stock, and the LSWR providing infrastructure and operations staff.

The Joint line connected with other LSWR routes at Poole and Bournemouth, and that was the most important passenger flow, with a lower usage of the Templecombe connection with the Salisbury–Exeter line. Freight traffic interchange at Templecombe was considerable, however.

== Grouping of the railways ==
In the nineteenth century and the first two decades of the twentieth, Parliament had fostered competition between railway companies, seeing most cooperative alliances as anti-competitive. However the demands of the First World War, in which the railways had been directed by Government, and had been unable to renew and maintain their systems normally, coupled with the general external competitive situation, had led to a situation in which continued competition was unsustainable, and the Government enacted the Railways Act 1921 which compelled the major railway companies of Great Britain to combine into four groups—the so-called "Big Four". This took effect on 1 January 1923, when the LSWR was absorbed into the new Southern Railway along with its southerly neighbour, the London, Brighton and South Coast Railway and the South Eastern and Chatham Railway. The GWR formed a group of its own (combining with a large number of smaller lines). Competition to the south, to Portsmouth and Epsom ceased, but critically, competition in the West with the GWR was unaffected. The Somerset & Dorset remained a joint railway, owned by the Southern and the London, Midland and Scottish Railway, new owners of the Midland Railway, who also remained fiercely competitive with the GWR.
