= Rousdon =

Village in Devon, England

Coordinates: 50.71671°N 2.99868°W

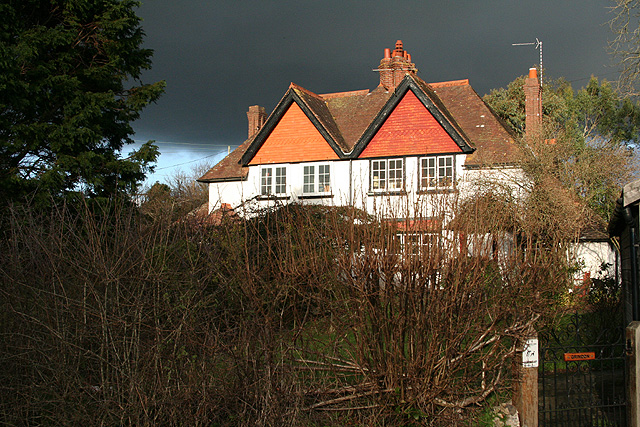
- Combpyne Rousdon, house at Rousdon

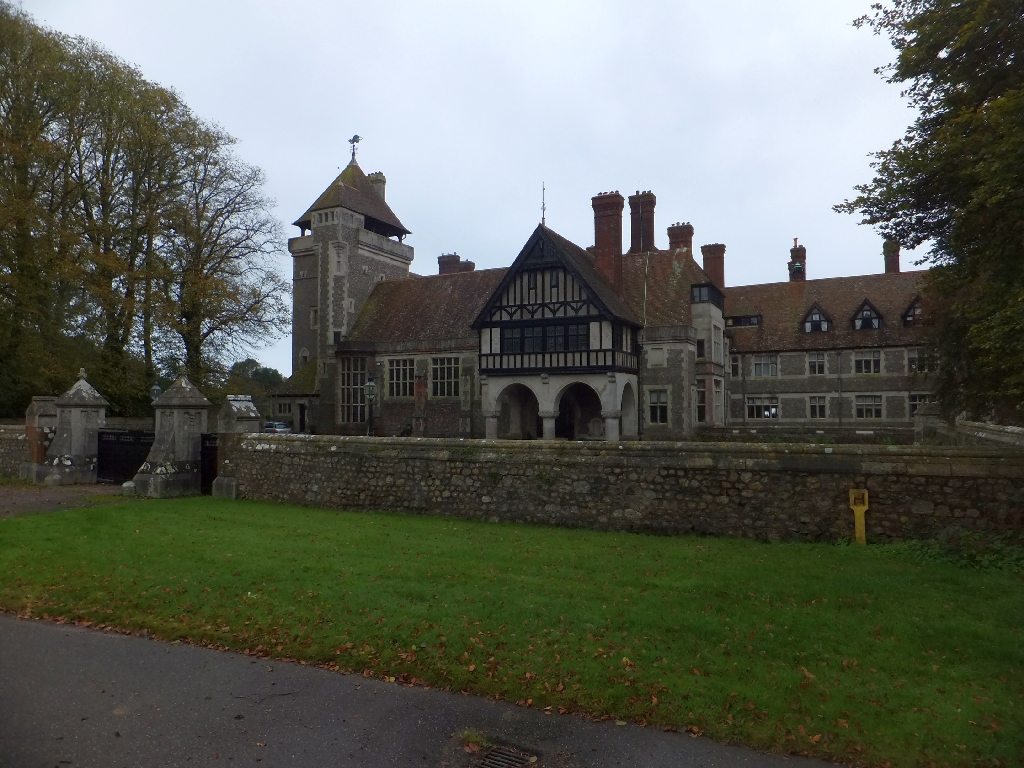
- Peek House, Rousdon

- Location within Devon
- OS grid reference: SY294912
- Civil parish: Combpyne Rousdon
- District: East Devon
- Shire county: Devon
- Region: South West
- Country: England
- Sovereign state: United Kingdom
- Post town: LYME REGIS
- Postcode district: DT7
- Dialling code: 01297
- Police: Devon and Cornwall
- Fire: Devon and Somerset
- Ambulance: South Western
- UK Parliament: Honiton and Sidmouth

Rousdon is a village and former civil parish, now in the parish of Combpyne Rousdon, in the East Devon district, in the county of Devon, England. It is off the A3052 road between Colyford and Lyme Regis in Dorset. In 1931 the parish had a population of 41. On 1 April 1939 the parish was abolished to form "Combpyne Rousdon".

The clifftop but well set back village developed as the main settlement, within its ecclesiastical parish Combpyne, which otherwise has only a few houses by its church and scattered farms. It did so north of Sir Henry Peek's grand house, billiard house and separate stable courtyard chiefly in the early 19th century. A boarding school called Allhallows moved there from Honiton in 1937 and closed in 1998.

Adjoining the small fields to the south are the coastal cliffs which lie above the Axmouth to Lyme Regis Undercliff Nature Reserve that forms part of the Jurassic Coast World Heritage Site. It is a green wilderness littoral forest strip with many rugged parts and ruins of farmhouses formed largely from a landslip (major cliff erosion) in 1839. The South West Coast Path crosses it for some miles. No public right of way links Rousdon directly, nor any adjacent area, to the path below along Charton Bay which links the foot of the Axe estuary south of Axmouth (at the western edge of Seaton Seaton to Ware), immediately south-west of Lyme Regis, on the Dorset border.

== Layout ==
Rousdon is a small linear hamlet laid out to the north of the A3052. The village comprises a small number of dwellings arranged around the A3052 and a private lane, School Lane, a short distance further to the north of Peek Hall (now the Rousdon Village Hall and Social Club). The village also has a number of business within it such as the Rousdon Village Bakery and several car repair garages.

Between these is a new build development on the site of a former water tower which forms holiday rental accommodation. Five fields at the heart of the village, south of the main street and around the touring park to the north are lined with mature trees, but surrounding land is intensively agricultural and has modest or narrow hedgerows around most fields. The Undercliff has most of the trees of the south of the parish, in the northern end, Pynecomb copses grow increasingly towards the north. Horton near Uplyme to the far north-east is still well-forested.

== History ==
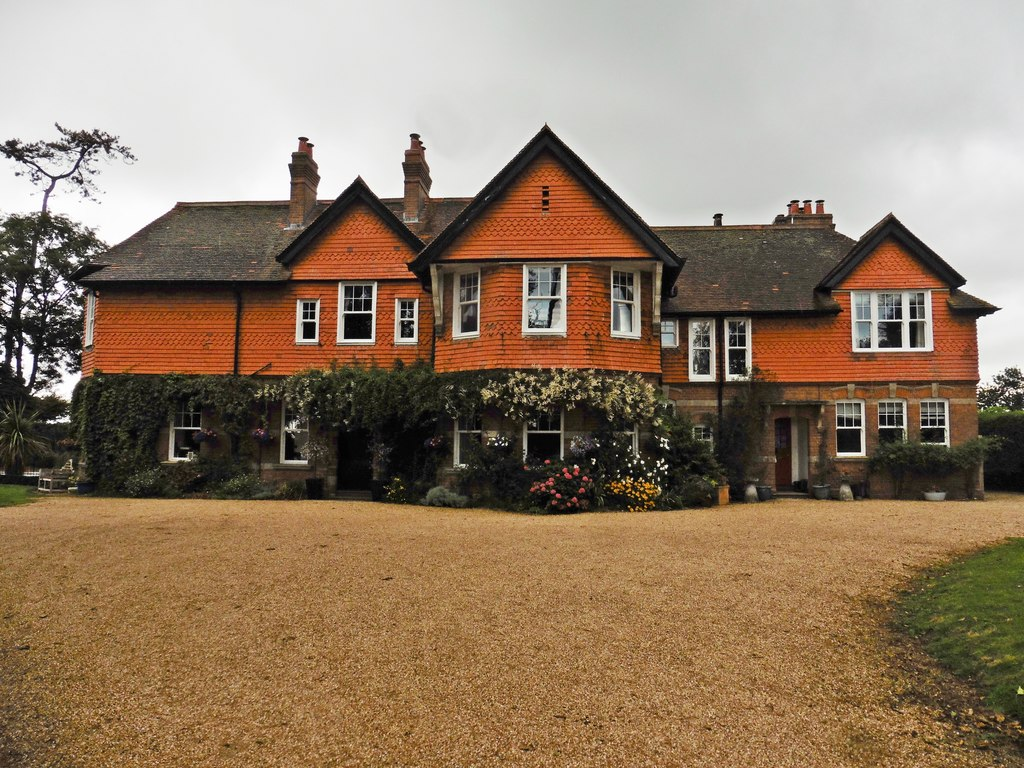
The Dower House Hotel was among Sir Henry's Peek legacy to Rousdon, such as the smaller gate house standing in the village. This building is now also a hotel-guesthouse.

The parish and manor were anciently known over time as: Dona (per the Domesday Book of 1086, noting to orthodox Norman-schooled scribes a combination of 'un' may have been the sound denoted which was banned from writing as would appear the same as "m" see Middle English orthography) but later Dune, la Dune, Doune, Rawesdon, Doune Rauf, Doune Rafe, Downraff, Rowston in Axmouth, Rowston alias Downe Ralfe, Rowsedown, etc. The Devon historian Risdon called it Rowsedown, whilst his contemporary Pole called it Doune Raph. All of these suggest a person name (such as Ralph, which was seen among Norman and Norse-ancestry chieftains including Ralph the Timid, Earl of Hereford before his 1057 death), with the later addition of a Saxon possessive "s" and down being as the word does mean in English for place name endings i.e. its celtic sense dūn, hill.
