= Pinhay =

Hamlet in Devon, England

Coordinates: 50.719069°N 2.963219°W

- Location within Devon
- OS grid reference: SY3209991492
- Civil parish: Combpyne Rousdon
- District: East Devon
- Shire county: Devon
- Region: South West
- Country: England
- Sovereign state: United Kingdom
- Post town: LYME REGIS
- Postcode district: DT7 3R
- Dialling code: 01395
- Police: Devon and Cornwall
- Fire: Devon and Somerset
- Ambulance: South Western
- UK Parliament: Honiton and Sidmouth

Pinhay is a hamlet in the civil parish of Combpyne Rousdon in the East Devon district of Devon, England. The hamlet lies approximately 1.5 miles (2.4 km) south-west from Lyme Regis, its nearest town.

Pinhay is home to Pinhay Bay, a large face of cliffs which lies along the Jurassic Coast. To the eastern side of Pinhay Bay are the Ware Cliffs, which is also named after its its hamlet.
