= Monmouth Beach, Lyme Regis =

Beach in Dorset, England

- Beach
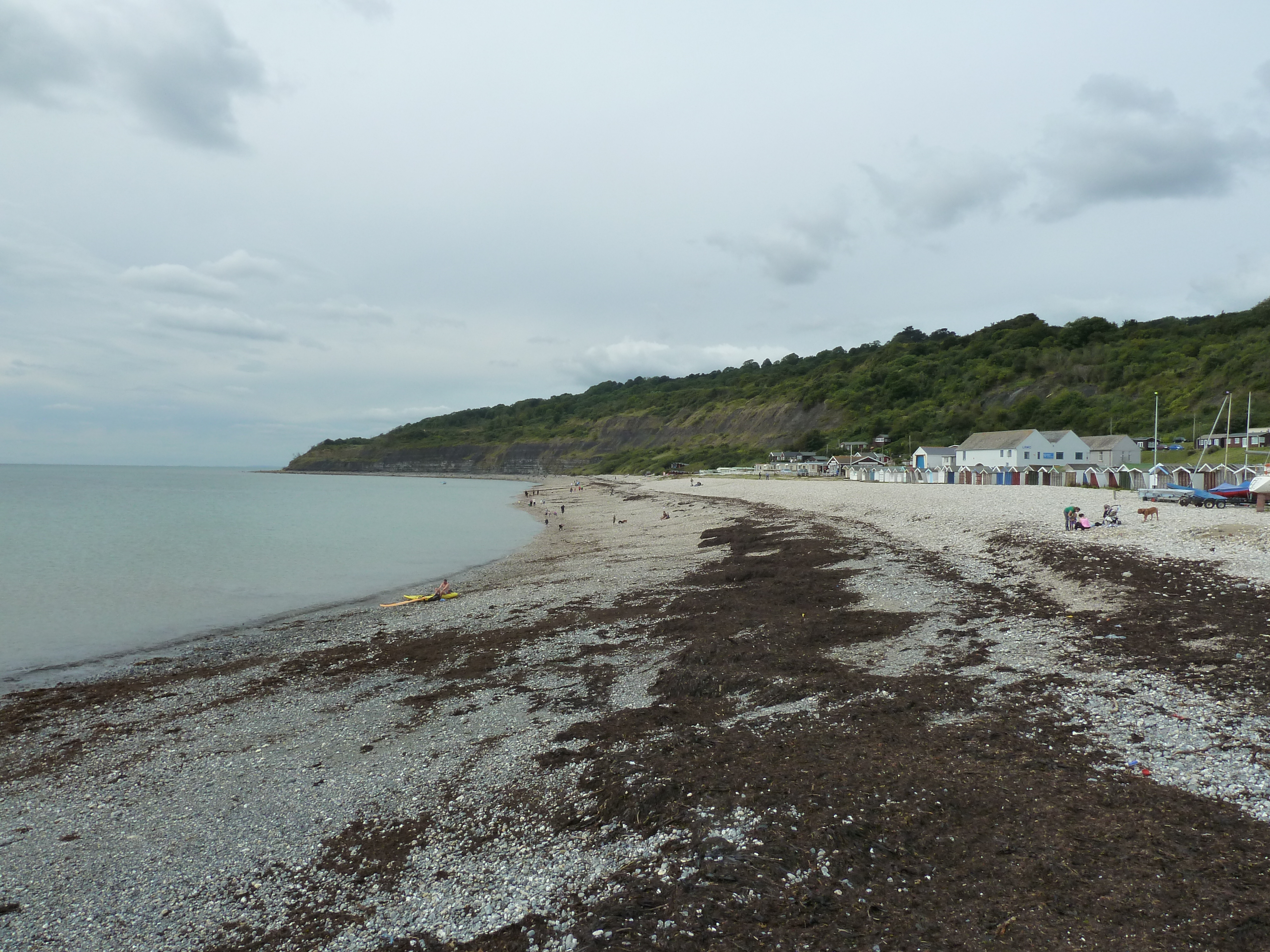
- Monmouth Beach from near the Cobb at Lyme Regis

- Coordinates: 50.718227°N 2.94837°W
- Location: Dorset, England

Monmouth Beach is a pebble and rock beach stretching approximately 1 mile (1.6 km) westwards from the harbour at Lyme Regis, Dorset to Pinhay Bay, East Devon. It is part of the Jurassic Coast, situated below Ware Cliffs, and includes Poker's Pool, Virtle Rock and Chippel Bay. Virtle Rock is the furthest islet from the coast in Poker's Pool.

The name derives from the landing here of Duke of Monmouth in 1685 during his attempt to take the crown from King James II. Following the defeat of the Duke of Monmouth, twelve locals were hanged on the beach on the order of the notorious "Hanging Judge" Jeffreys.

== Fossils ==
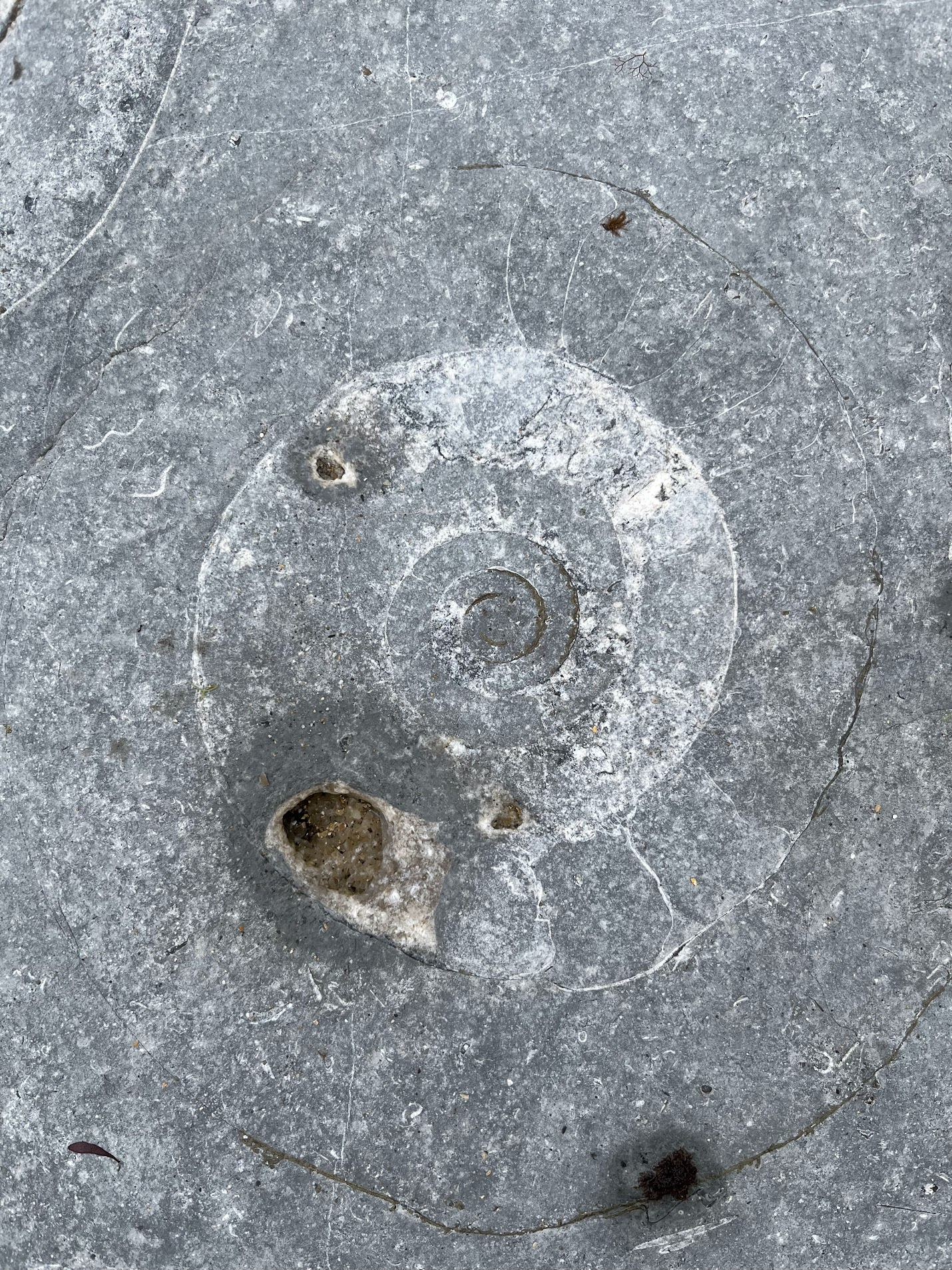
Ammonite fossil from the ammonite pavement at Monmouth beach

Monmouth Beach is now owned by the National Trust, and is very popular with fossil hunters, as ammonites, belemnites, plant fossils and even a few remains of Ichthyosaur vertebrae fossils have been found here. The cliffs are estimated to be 199-189 million years old.

The "ammonite pavement" or "ammonite graveyard" at Monmouth beach is a limestone layer with many ammonite fossils, including large specimens 0.5-1 meter in diameter. Coroniceras features prominently. Most ammonite fossils include the ammonite's outer coil, but the middle parts are often crushed. Crinoids and the bivalve Gryphaea ("devil's toenail") are also present. The pavement is part of the Blue Lias formation In 2017, several sections of the ammonite slab broke off in a storm, and these were moved off of the beach for further study and preservation.
