= Combpyne =

Hamlet in Devon, England

Coordinates: 50.72575°N 3.00727°W

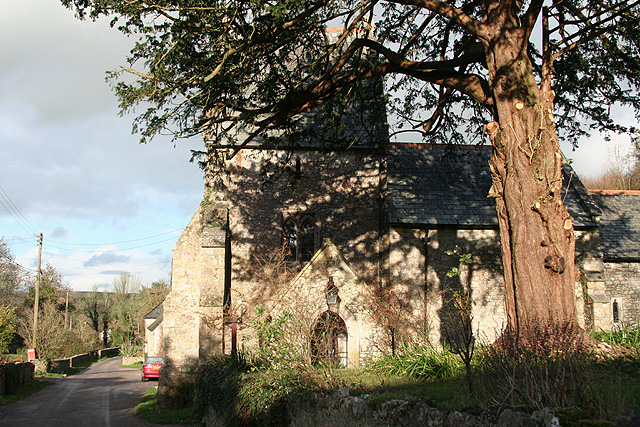
- St Mary the Virgin, Combpyne Rousdon

- Location within Devon
- OS grid reference: SY289922
- Civil parish: Combpyne Rousdon
- District: East Devon
- Shire county: Devon
- Region: South West
- Country: England
- Sovereign state: United Kingdom
- Post town: AXMINSTER
- Postcode district: EX13
- Police: Devon and Cornwall
- Fire: Devon and Somerset
- Ambulance: South Western
- UK Parliament: Honiton and Sidmouth

Combpyne is a village and former civil parish, now in the parish of Combpyne Rousdon, in the East Devon district, in the county of Devon, England. It is off the A3052 road between Colyford and Lyme Regis in Dorset. In 1931 the parish had a population of 83. On 1 April 1939 the parish was abolished to form "Combpyne Rousdon".

Combpyne is situated within a remote Devon combe, and features a medieval manor house, a 12th-century church housing wall paintings and ancient bells and a village pond known as 'The Harbour'. It is in a parish that also includes the village of Rousdon to the south.

The former railway station at Combpyne was a part of the Lyme Regis branch line and closed in 1965, along with many other small branch lines across the county. Traces of the dismantled railway, including the large Cannington Viaduct, can be seen nearby. The former stationmaster's house is now a private residence.
