= Combpyne railway station =

Closed railway station in Lyme Regis, East Devon, England

Coordinates: 50.7259°N 2.9927°W

Combpyne

General information
- Location: Lyme Regis, East Devon; England
- Platforms: 1

Other information
- Status: Disused

History
- Original company: Axminster and Lyme Regis Railway
- Pre-grouping: London and South Western Railway
- Post-grouping: Southern Railway

Key dates
- 24 August 1903: Station opens
- 29 November 1965: Station closes
Location

Combpyne railway station was the intermediate station on the Lyme Regis branch line in East Devon, England. Serving the village of Combpyne, it was sited high on the sharp bend that changed the course of the line from south to an easterly direction.

== History ==
Opened on 24 August 1903 by the Axminster and Lyme Regis Railway, which was authorised under the Light Railways Act 1896, it was operated from the start by the London and South Western Railway then by the Southern Railway. The line then passed on to the Southern Region of British Railways on nationalisation in 1948. A camping coach was positioned here by the Southern Region from 1954 to 1963. The line was transferred to the Western Region of British Railways in January 1963. It was then closed by the British Railways Board on 29 November 1965.

Preceding station	Disused railways	Following station
Axminster; Line closed, station open	Western Region of British Railways; Lyme Regis branch line	Lyme Regis; Line and station closed

== Buildings ==
A station consisted of a single short platform with a station house on a nearby road.

== The site today ==
The former station house still exists.
