= Lyme Regis railway station =

Former railway station in Dorset, England

Coordinates: 50.7292°N 2.9455°W

Lyme Regis

General information
- Location: Lyme Regis, Dorset; England
- Platforms: 1

Other information
- Status: Disused

History
- Original company: Axminster and Lyme Regis Railway
- Pre-grouping: London and South Western Railway
- Post-grouping: Southern Railway

Key dates
- 24 August 1903: Station opened
- 29 November 1965: Station closed
Location

Lyme Regis railway station was the terminus of the Lyme Regis branch line, in the English county of Dorset. Serving the coastal resort town of Lyme Regis, it was sited high above the town centre as a result of the hilly nature of the local area. The line straddled the county boundary so that, although the terminus was in Dorset, most of the line lay in the neighbouring county of Devon.

== History ==
Opened under the Light Railways Act 1896, it was operated from the start by the London and South Western Railway.

A small wooden building served the single platform. The station also had a signal box, an engine shed and a small goods shed.

The line passed on to the Southern Railway in 1923 and the Southern Region of British Railways on nationalisation in 1948. It was then transferred to the Western Region in 1963.

The branch line and the station were closed by the British Railways Board in November 1965.

Preceding station	Disused railways	Following station
Combpyne; Line and station closed	Western Region of British Railways; Lyme Regis branch line	Terminus

== The site today ==
The former site is now used by a builders' merchant and a small industrial estate. The station building was moved to Alresford, on the Watercress Line, a heritage line in nearby Hampshire. No trace of the station remains.
