= Pinhay Bay =

Bay on the south coast of Devon, England

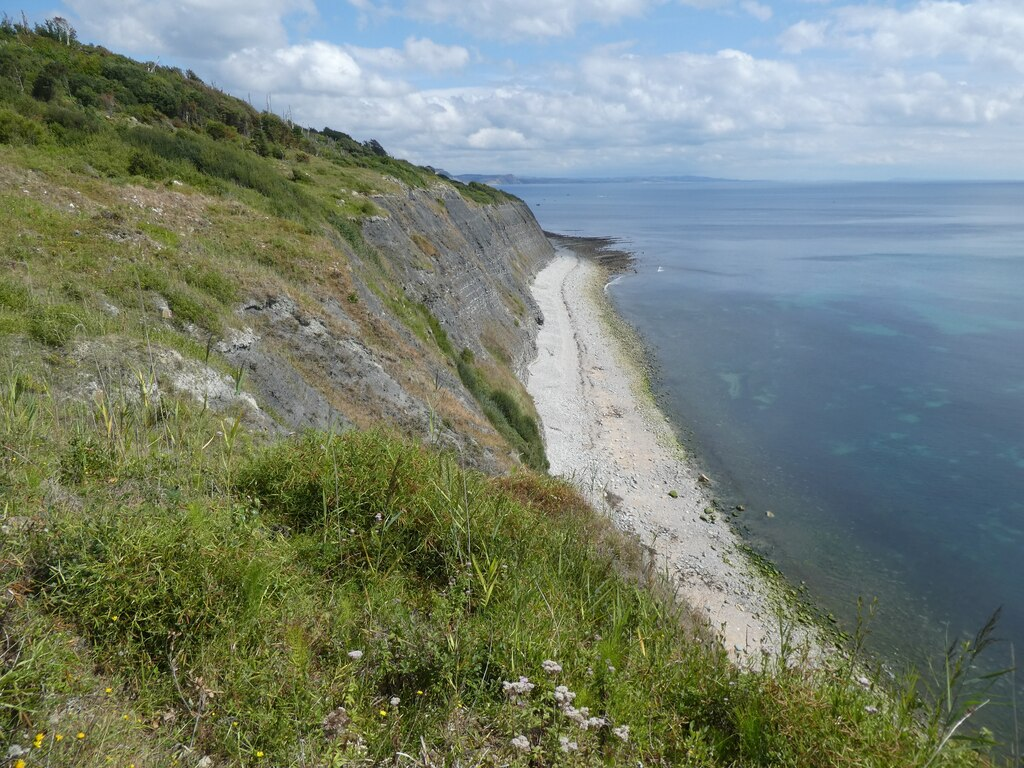
- Pinhay Bay cliffs
- Location: Devon, England
- Coordinates: 50.7119°N 2.9655°W

Location
- Interactive map of Pinhay Bay

Pinhay Bay is a bay in Devon, on the south coast of England, about 2 kilometres (1.2 mi) southwest of Lyme Regis and about 6 kilometres (3.7 mi) east of Seaton. The bay receives its name from the hamlet of Pinhay which is situated slightly inland.

== Geography ==
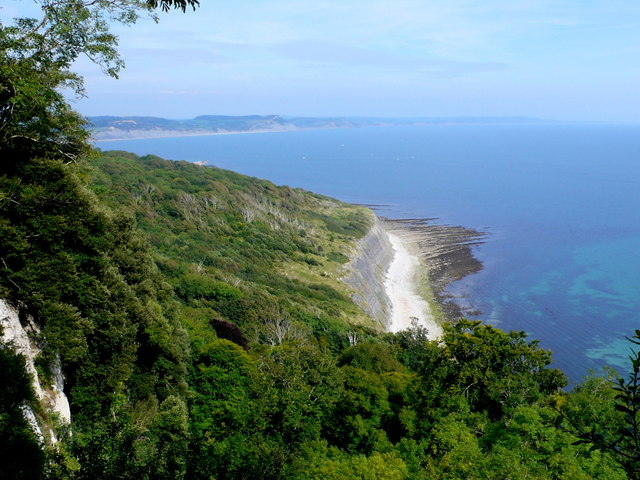
Pinhay Bay from The Crimean Seat

Approximately 2 kilometres (1.2 mi) further west, toward Axmouth and Seaton, lies Charton Bay, with a wider expanse of shingle beach than Pinhay Bay and the Axmouth to Lyme Regis Undercliff stretching in a large terraces inland. This is accessible from Charton Goyle at the top of the cliff via a slightly arduous and worn path with many flights of wooden steps. This route was once popular but is long since abandoned after the demise of the village earlier in the 20th century.

The surrounding terrain is rugged. To the west are Pinhay Cliffs and to the east Ware Cliffs.

Pinhay Bay is part of the Jurassic Coast.
