= Georgina Castle Smith =

English children's writer (1845–1933)

Georgina Castle Smith (née Georgina Meyrick, pseudonym Brenda, 9 May 1845 – 27 December 1933) was a popular, productive English writer of didactic children's books. Some of her books highlighted the social needs of "street arabs" (homeless children) and encouraged people to donate clothing and food to them.

== Background ==
Georgina was the fourth child of a solicitor, William Meyrick (1809 or 1810–1898), in Bayswater, London, and his wife Eliza (née James, born 1817 or 1818). She suffered as a child from hay fever and asthma, which encouraged her to be bookish. Having appeared as the tenant of various premises in Bayswater, her father can no longer be traced after 1872. He may be the person of that name declared bankrupt in 1874. He appears to have deserted his family and died abroad.

== Work ==
All Georgina's books appeared under the pseudonym Brenda. The first, Nothing to Nobody (1873) predates the collapse to the family's finances. It tells of poverty and advocates practical philanthropy through the story of a Sunday school teacher reforming an orphan known as Daddy Long Legs. This was also published in the United States in an undated edition, probably from 1874.

The success of Nothing to Nobody encouraged "Brenda" to write a second, similarly didactic story, about two orphan boys in East London, of whom the younger dies: Froggy's Little Brother (c. 1875). This sold steadily for fifty years and was a frequent choice as a prize book awarded to children. A film appeared in 1921.

The illustrations for the second book were the work of a solicitor, Castle Smith (1849–1936). He and Georgina married shortly afterwards and settled in St John's Wood. They had five children.

"Brenda" published 13 children's books over the next 15 years. A further eight appeared between 1890 and 1932, including a sequel to Froggy's Little Brother in 1914. Five Little Partridges, or, The Pilot's House deals with the seaside stay of a middle-class family and may refer to her own children. The Secret Terror (1909) is set in high society, partly in India, and was one of the two works of hers aimed at adult readers.

== Retirement ==
The family retired to Lyme Regis in Dorset, where she died at her home, Corner Cottage, on 27 December 1933 and was buried in the cemetery there. The town community appears in The Earl's Granddaughter (1895), which describes how an upper-class girl is converted to good works.
