= Conger cuddling =

Event in which a dead eel is thrown

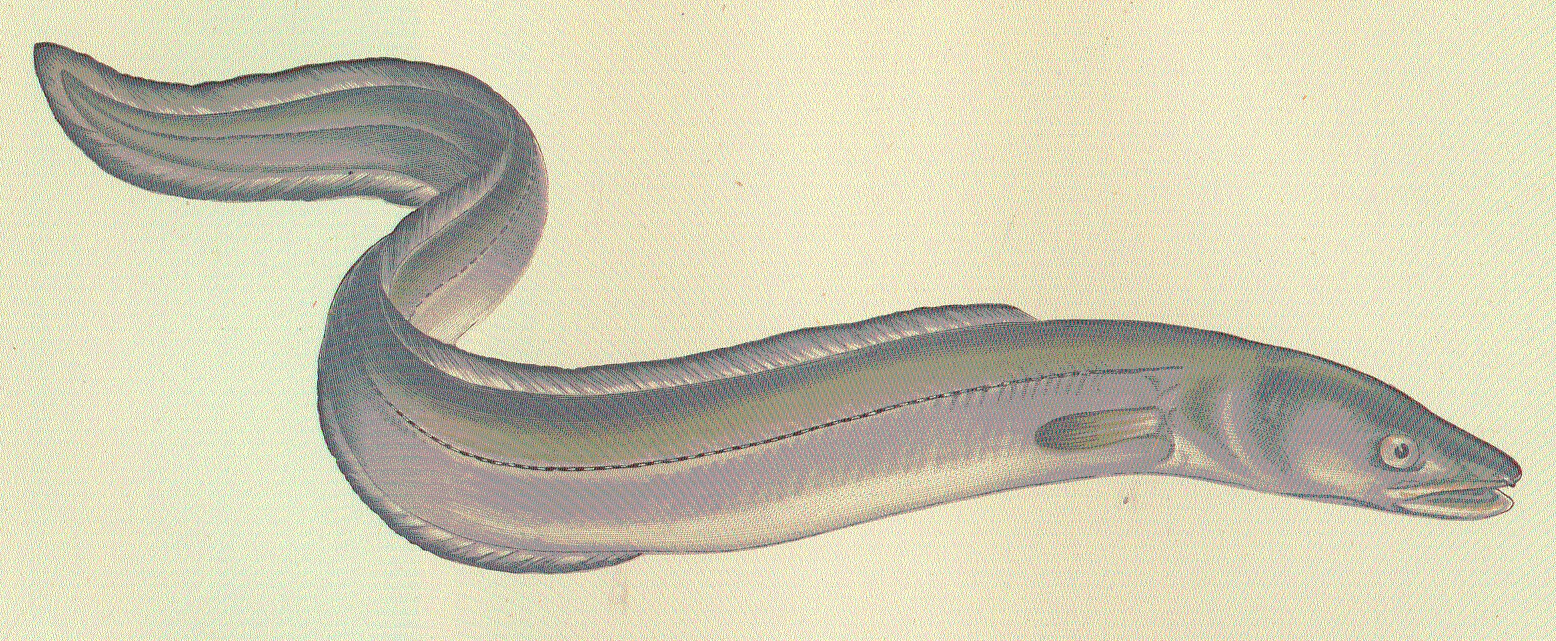
The event uses a dead conger eel

Conger cuddling is a traditional event in Lyme Regis, Dorset, England, in which a dead conger eel is thrown at members of the Royal National Lifeboat Institution (RNLI). The practice was stopped in 2006 when animal rights activists threatened to launch a campaign against it.

== Event ==
Part of the town's "Lifeboat Week", the eel is attached to a rope and thrown at nine people standing on flowerpots in a manner similar to skittles. There are two teams involved in a last man standing competition.

The event, which attracted around 3,000 people annually between the 1970s and 1990s, was used to raise funds for the RNLI. It has been called the "most fun a person could have with a dead fish". The event would generally raise around £5,600 (equivalent to £10,234 in 2023) for the RNLI.

== History ==
The event started in the early 1970s when Richard Fox, a retired publican, organised the first event. It became a tradition of the town, drawing numerous spectators. Fishermen would catch the eels in their nets accidentally, freeze them and defrost them for the competition.

In 2006 the RNLI made the decision that the event was "inappropriate" after a complaint was made that it was 'disrespecting fish'. The complaint was made by an animal rights activist who threatened to film the event and launch a campaign against it. A spokesman says that "We decided that it really wasn't worth upsetting anybody by going ahead with using a dead conger, but it's a dead conger, for Pete's sake. I shouldn't think the conger could care one way or another." For that year's event the eel was replaced by a plastic buoy, and there were plans made for a plastic eel to be made in time for a 2007 contest.

The game was planned for a return in 2012 with a real dead eel, but not as part of Lifeboat Week, instead as a game in the "Lyme Lympics", a set of unusual local games. The Lympics were to be filmed for Rory McGrath's television series Great British Adventure, with McGrath joining in himself, however the event was cancelled on the day.
