= Ware Cliffs =

UK geological feature

- Cliffs
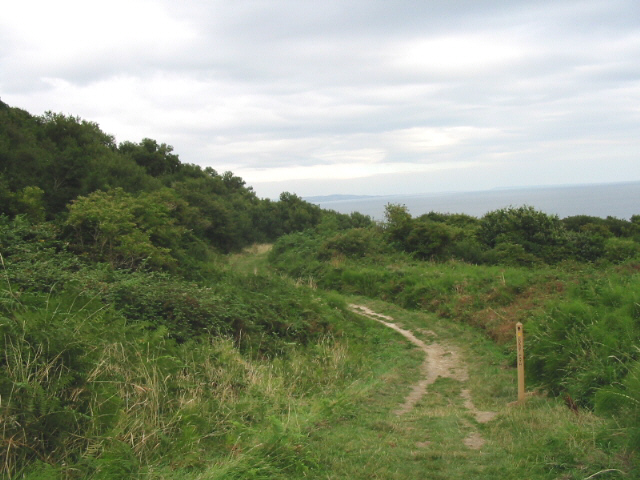
- Coast path from Ware Cliffs down to Lyme Regis

- Coordinates: 50.715591°N 2.953005°W
- Location: Dorset, England

Ware Cliffs are a set of long cliffs which stretch westwards from the town of Lyme Regis in Dorset to the Ware hamlet in the East Devon district of Devon, England. They are situated near Pinhay Bay and their highest point is the Black Ven, which reaches a height of approximately 137 metres (449 ft).

The exposed rock formation dates to the early Jurassic period around 199-189 million years ago and many fossils have been found along the beaches.
