= Lyme Regis Cemetery =

Principal cemetery in Lyme Regis, Dorset, England

Coordinates: 50.7303°N 2.9317°W

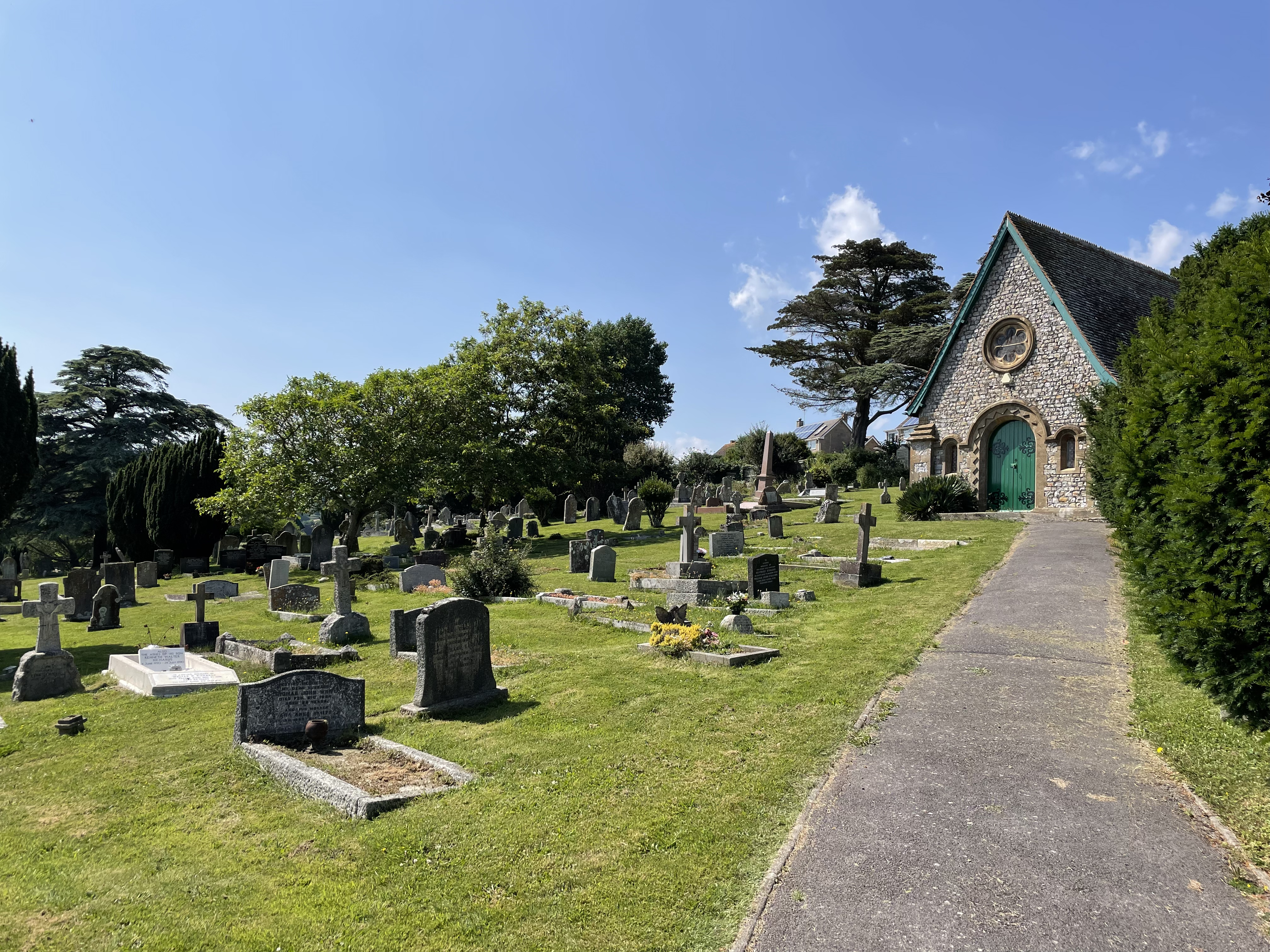
- The cemetery in 2021

Details
- Established: 1856
- Location: Charmouth Road, Lyme Regis, Dorset
- Country: England
- No. of graves: ~2,400
- No. of interments: Estimated 3,570–5,000+
- Find a Grave: Lyme Regis Cemetery

Lyme Regis Cemetery is the principal cemetery in the English town of Lyme Regis, Dorset. Estimates for the number of burials in the cemetery range from 3,570 to over 5,000, nearly half of which may today be unmarked. It was opened on 16 November 1856 as a replacement for the graveyard surrounding St Michael the Archangel – Lyme Regis' parish church – which had long suffered from erosion due to its close proximity to the sea.

== History ==
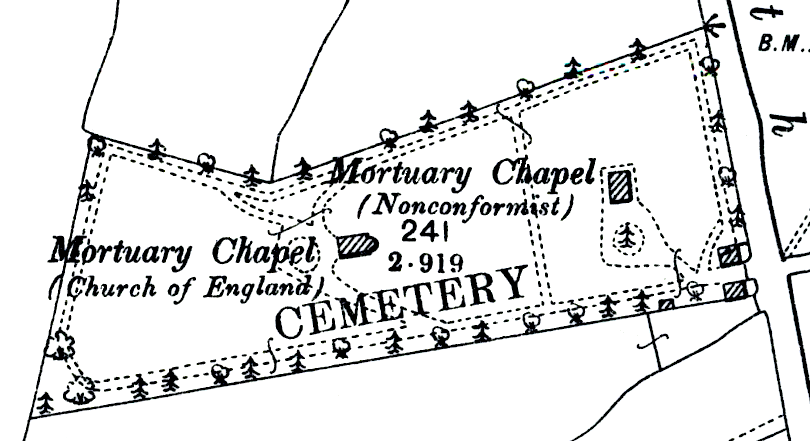
Lyme Regis Cemetery depicted on an Ordnance Survey map from 1903.

Initially, the principal place of burial was in the churchyard of St Michael the Archangel, Lyme Regis' parish church. However, due to its close proximity to the sea, the churchyard had started to erode away, losing many burials to the sea. Because of this, in the 1850s it was decided that a cemetery should be constructed elsewhere in the town.

Once the newly formed Lyme Regis Burial Board had identified three potential sites, one at Charmouth Road and two at Sidmouth Road, a vestry meeting voted to seek the assistance of a government inspector in choosing one. This was undertaken in June 1855, when Mr. Holland inspected the three sites with members of the Burial Board, and the Charmouth Road site was chosen and formally approved by the inspector under the Burials Act.

A vestry meeting held on 2 August 1855 then determined to purchase three acres of the selected site. It was originally intended to enclose two acres and keep the remaining one in reserve for future expansion, but a vestry meeting on 22 November 1855, held at the request of the Burial Board, decided that all three acres should be enclosed.

The cemetery was laid out in 1856, after builder John Jerrard of Lyme Regis was given the contract for constructing the walls and two mortuary chapels in January 1856. One chapel was for Church of England services and the other for Dissenters (Nonconformists); only the Church of England chapel is still open for services today. At the entrance, a lodge for the keeper and a waiting room were built. The lodge was later extended for use as a mortuary and post-mortem room, and is now used for storage, whereas the waiting room was demolished in the 1930s.

The Bishop of Salisbury, Walter Kerr Hamilton, consecrated the Church of England section of the cemetery and its associated chapel on 1 November 1856, and the first burial took place on 16 November.

The cemetery's original plans were revised in 1870 to allow for more burials. Shrubs and trees were also planted. Another expansion was required to the west side, which was consecrated by the Bishop of Sherborne in 1935. In 2020, the council closed the entrances via King's Way and Elizabeth Close in order to stop the cemetery being used as a public thoroughfare.

== Notable burials ==
The cemetery allows anyone regardless of connection to Lyme Regis to be buried, however non-residents pay higher fees. Notable burials include:

- Elizabeth Philpot, fossil collector, known for her collaborations with Mary Anning
- Georgina Castle Smith, children's writer

The cemetery also contains the war graves of 17 Commonwealth service personnel, 10 of which are from World War I and 7 from World War II.
