= Axmouth to Lyme Regis Undercliffs =

Landslip induced landscape on the English south coast

- Site of Special Scientific Interest
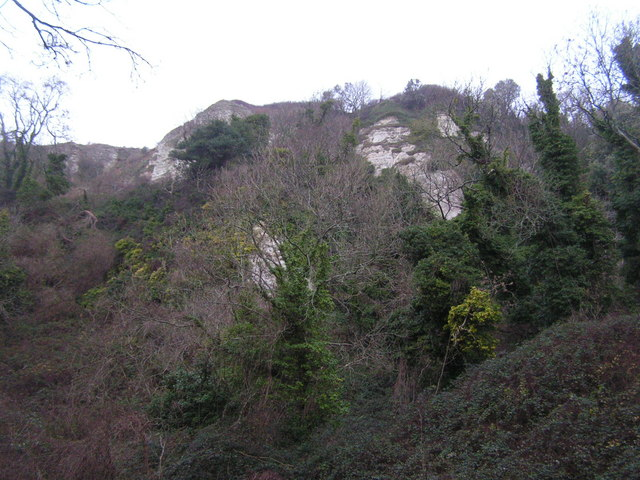
- Chalk cliffs in the undercliff

- Location within Devon
- Location of Axmouth to Lyme Regis Undercliffs.
- Area of search: Devon
- Coordinates: 50°42′09″N 3°01′11″W
- Interest: Biological/Geological
- Notification date: 1952

The Axmouth to Lyme Regis Undercliffs, also often referred to in the singular as the Undercliff, is a 5-mile (8.0 km) long landscape feature, National Nature Reserve and Site of Special Scientific Interest that connects Seaton and Axmouth with Lyme Regis on the south-west coast of England. Like its namesake on the Isle of Wight, this feature arose as a result of landslips, where a slump of harder strata over softer clay gave rise to irregular landscapes of peaks, gullies and slipped blocks. Because of the resulting difficulty of access and change of land use, the undercliff has become densely vegetated, and has become a rare and unusual habitat for plants and birds.

From west to east, the undercliff forms part of the civil parishes of Axmouth, Combpyne Rousdon and Uplyme, all in the county of Devon. At its eastern end, it also stretches a short way into the town of Lyme Regis, in the county of Dorset. It forms part of the Jurassic Coast World Heritage Site and the South West Coast Path runs through it. The footpath stretches for 7 – 8 miles (13 km) and is not accessible except at each end. It is not permitted to leave the path due to the nature reserve status and the dangerous terrain.

Some of the landslips that created the undercliff took place within historical record. Recorded slips took place in 1775, 1828, 1839 (the Great Slip) and 1840. The 1839 slip was especially well-documented since the geologists William Buckland and William Daniel Conybeare were in the area to survey it. A large tract of land below Bindon Manor and Dowlands Farm slipped, creating the features now called Goat Island and the Chasm. It took with it an area of sown wheatfield which remained sufficiently undamaged for the wheat to be harvested in 1840, when the slip was a popular visitor attraction.

The undercliff was formerly open rough pasture, grazed by sheep and rabbits, including features such as Donkey Green (an area of turf used for picnics and sports), Landslip Cottage (which used to sell teas to visitors), and Chapel Rock (where, according to tradition, Tudor religious dissenters met). However, it became heavily overgrown in the 20th century following the cessation of sheep farming and the decline in rabbits due to myxomatosis, and access is now difficult, the terrain being treacherous due to its unstable cliffs, deep gullies and dense undergrowth.

Sabine Baring-Gould's 1900 novel Winefred, a story of the chalk cliffs is set in the Undercliff area, with the Great Slip as its climax. The undercliff was also one of the settings for the novel The French Lieutenant's Woman and a location for its film adaptation.
