= Combpyne Rousdon =

Civil parish

Coordinates: 50.72°N 3°W

Combpyne Rousdon is a civil parish in the East Devon district of the county of Devon in England. As well as the villages of Combpyne and Rousdon, it contains the hamlet of Pinhay. In the 2001 UK census its population was recorded as 231 persons, living in 88 households, increasing to 362 in the 2011 Census.
