= Ware, Devon =

Hamlet in Devon, England

Coordinates: 50.721635°N 2.954485°W

Ware
- Location within Devon
- OS grid reference: SY3271991769
- Civil parish: Uplyme
- District: East Devon
- Shire county: Devon
- Region: South West
- Country: England
- Sovereign state: United Kingdom
- Post town: LYME REGIS
- Postcode district: DT7 3
- Dialling code: 01395
- Police: Devon and Cornwall
- Fire: Devon and Somerset
- Ambulance: South Western
- UK Parliament: Honiton and Sidmouth

Ware is a hamlet in the East Devon district of Devon, England. The hamlet lies approximately 0.8 miles (1.3 km) south-west from Lyme Regis, just off the Jurassic Coast.
