= Lyme Regis branch line =

Defunct railway line in Dorset and Devon, England

The Lyme Regis branch line was a railway branch line connecting the seaside town of Lyme Regis with the main line railway network at Axminster, running through picturesque rural countryside on the Dorset - Devon border.

It opened in 1903; penetrating difficult topography, the line was very steeply graded and sharply curved; on summer weekends high passenger levels were carried, with through carriages from London on many services. The line was of great interest to railway enthusiasts in later years due to the three LSWR 415 class tank engines in use there; these units survived long after the rest were replaced on the London suburbs.

With the decline in usage of rural lines, the branch closed in 1965.

== Origins ==
In earlier times Lyme Regis had been a busy sea port, but as larger vessels came into use, its business declined. In the nineteenth century, railway travel gained importance, and a number of schemes to construct a railway were promoted; these included a line from Bridgwater (on the Bristol Channel) to Lyme Regis, and another connecting Bridport and Axminster or Chard Junction, serving Lyme Regis en route.

On 19 July 1860, the London and South Western Railway (LSWR) opened its main line between Yeovil and Exeter, giving the area rail transport to London; a horse-drawn omnibus operated between Lyme Regis and Axminster. Over the following years, a Lyme Regis Railway Company got as far as cutting the first sod on 29 September 1874, but got no further due to lack of funds.

The hilly terrain and sparse population militated against the financial viability of these projects, and a petition in 1898 with 1,630 names inviting the LSWR to build a branch line to Lyme Regis prompted no result.

The Light Railways Act 1896 came into force in 1896, encouraging the development of more modest—and cheaper—railway schemes, and on 15 June 1899 local promoters, now encouraged by the LSWR obtained a light railway order, the Lyme Regis branch line#Axminster and Lyme Regis Light Railway Order 1899, and Arthur C. Pain was appointed engineer of the new company, called the Axminster and Lyme Regis Light Railway.

The act authorised a share capital of £55,000, supplemented by £24,000 in loans. A contract for the construction of the railway was let to Baldrey and Yerburgh of Westminster, for a tender price of £36,542; Arthur C. Pain was appointed the company's engineer.

The LSWR subscribed £25,000 to the cost of the construction, and agreed to manage and work the line in perpetuity. It was to take up to 55% of receipts for expenses, plus 4% on the cost of works it provided; the owning company would take the balance unless that proved inadequate to pay 4% on the shareholders' £55,000, in which case the LSWR would rebate 10% on through traffic.

Construction began on 19 June 1900. The line generally followed contours, and there was only one major structure, the Cannington Viaduct. During its construction the west abutment and the adjacent pier slipped badly, delaying the opening. Other difficulties during construction resulted in delay and an extension of twelve months was authorised, and an application had to be made to the Board of Trade for an additional £10,000 in share capital and £3,000 in loans.

A special train was run on 22 January 1903 with VIP passengers to inspect the nearly-complete line, but difficulties with the Cannington Viaduct prevented the planned opening at Whitsun. The LSWR arranged a horse-drawn omnibus connection from Axminster to Lyme Regis in the intervening period.

The line eventually opened on 24 August 1903; the first train left Lyme Regis at 9.40 a.m., and at 12.25 p.m. a special train for dignitaries left Lyme, also carrying 200 children whose fare had been paid for by public subscription; the train returned at 1.15 p.m.

The railway was operated from the outset by the London and South Western Railway, and was well-used but financially unsuccessful, and the owning company asked the LSW to take it over, which it did, effective on 1 January 1907.

== The route ==
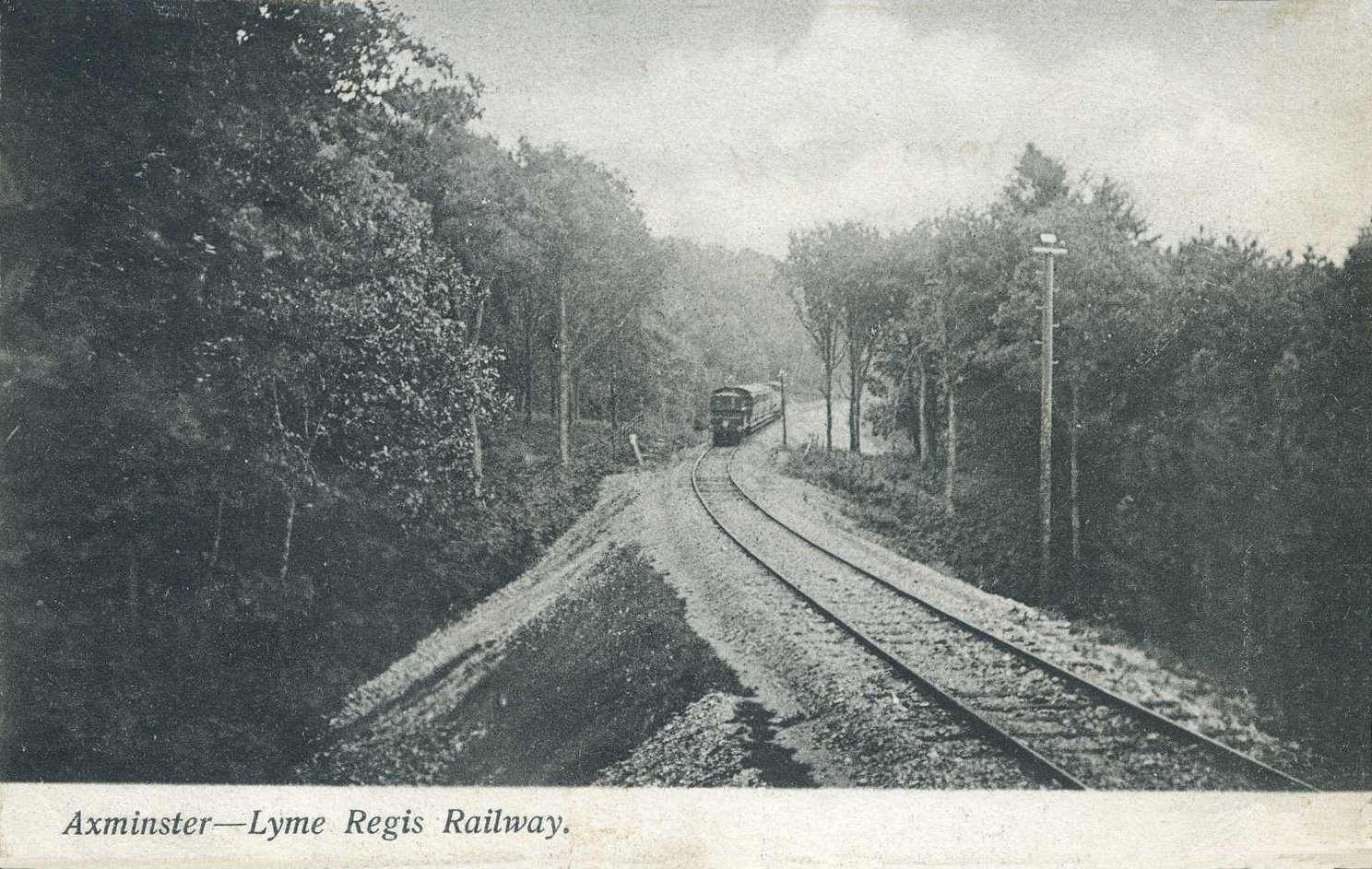
A train on the Lyme Regis branch line

The line was 6 miles 45.6 chains (10.57 km) long. (Note: Mitchell and Smith, and Phillips and Pryer quote 6¾ miles (10.86 km), but Williams quotes this slightly shorter distance to decimals of a chain) Starting from Axminster station, at the level of the River Axe there, it climbed, running broadly southerly to Combpyne, where the only intermediate station was sited. Turning broadly east, it now descended to Lyme Regis, crossing an arm of the River Lim on Cannington Viaduct, and passing through the village of Uplyme: the gradient was too steep to permit a station there. The station at Lyme Regis was inconveniently located on the northern margin of the town, because immediately beyond the line's buffer stops the land falls steeply towards the sea.

The ruling gradient was 1 in 40 (2.5%) in each direction. It was single throughout, with a passing loop at Combpyne. At Axminster passenger trains were accommodated on the Up (north) side of the station in a bay platform, and the line swung south across the main line by a bridge. However the goods yard there was on the down side, and at first there was a goods line access to the branch line on that side, controlled by two ground frames, one at the yard exit and one at the connection on to the single line, higher up. This required departing goods trains to stop and restart on the steep gradient twice while the ground frame was operated, and this difficult arrangement was taken out of use on 5 September 1915, after which down goods trains shunted to the Up side at Axminster and used the branch line itself.

Phillips states that at first the line was operated on the "one engine in steam" principle, with the run-round and yard points at Lyme Regis being operated by a key on the train staff; and that in 1906 Tyers no. 6 instruments were installed, enabling electric train token working, with two sections meeting at Combpyne.

Mitchell and Smith say that Combpyne "originally"—this probably means "after 1906"—had a passing loop, and a fourteen lever signal box. They say that only four levers were ever used, (confirmed by Maggs, suggesting an absence of running signals, implying that the loop was for shunting goods trains off the running line; however the same authors refer to the station having had two platform faces, implying passenger use. Phillips refers to four specific signals operated from the signal box—there were fixed distant signals. The 1910 public timetable reproduced by Mitchell and Smith shows no passenger trains crossing at Combpyne; nor does the July 1922 public timetable.

== Locomotives ==
The LSWR operated the branch from the beginning; the permanent way was very light and permissible axle loads limited, at 12 tons. The locomotives used at first were nos. 734 and 735, Terrier (A1) class 0-6-0T engines; they formerly belonged to the London, Brighton and South Coast Railway (LBSCR) for suburban work. However they were not entirely successful due to their limited power. From 1906, the LSWR’s own O2 class were employed; these were more powerful 0-4-4T locomotives, but they were not permitted to run with the engine water tanks more than half full to remain within the axle load limit, (Note: Mitchell and Smith imply that this refers to the O2s, but Phillips and Pryer attribute it to the Terriers) and they suffered badly from twisted frames and other wear defects due to the sharp line curvature.

From 1913, William Adams' design of unsuperheated 4-4-2T engine, the 415 class, usually referred to as "radial tanks" was brought in. The class had been employed on suburban work in London, and two members of the class were allocated to work on the branch. The trailing axle was designed to move laterally in guides that also rotated it (seen from above) so as to accommodate the curvature of the track. (Note: Mitchell and Smith state that they 'were nicknamed the "Radials" because of their unusual bogie linkage' but this appears to be a mistake; it was the trailing axle that was "radial".)

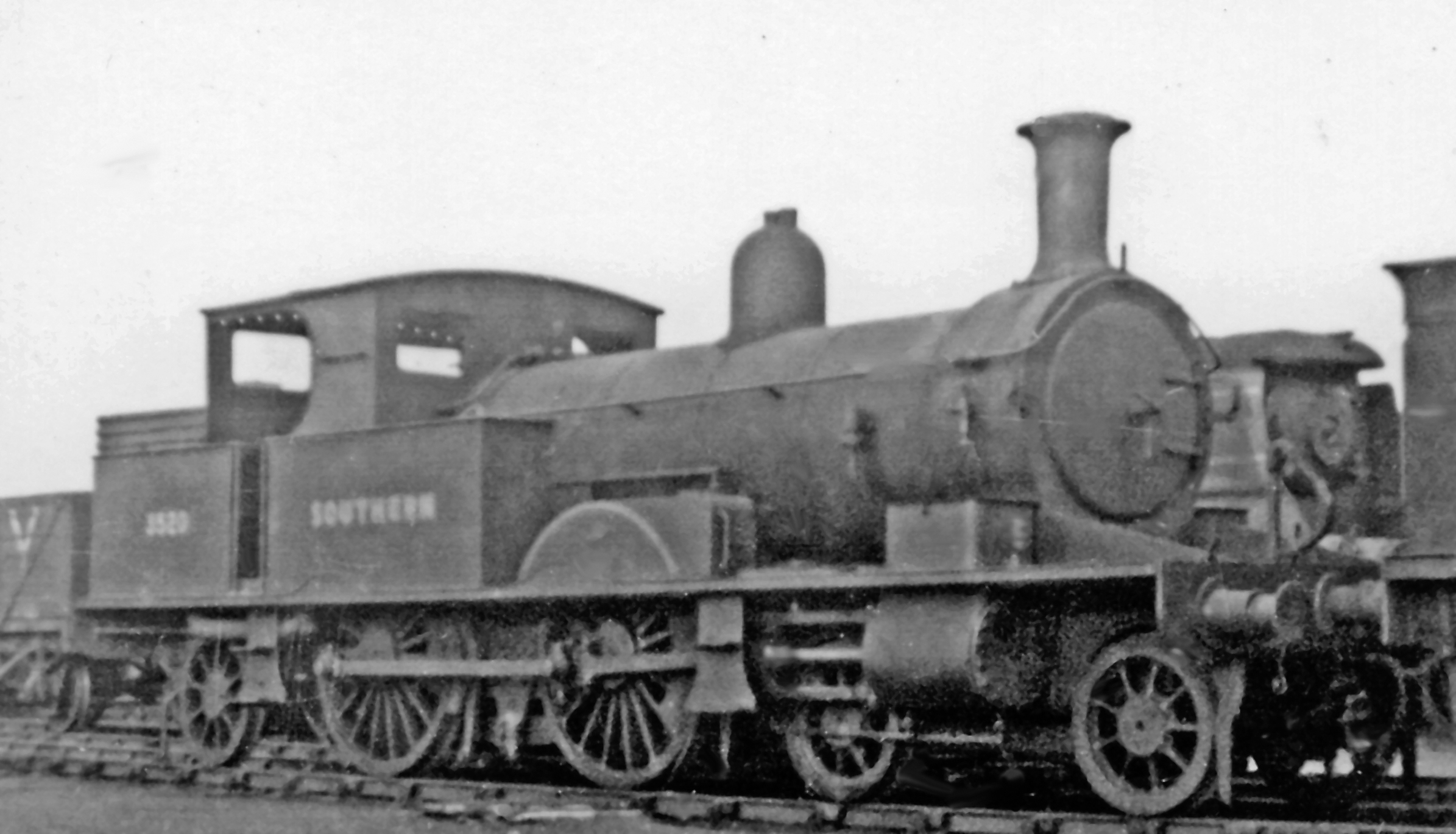
Adams 415 class engine

With a modification to reduce the water capacity to 800 gallons to reduce axle loads, (Note: Mitchell and Smith state that the trailing axle was modified) the locomotives, built in 1885, proved surprisingly successful. Trials in the 1920s with former LBSCR D1 class 0-4-2Ts and an ex South Eastern and Chatham Railway P class 0-6-0T were unsuccessful, and the Adams tanks soldiered on. As other members of the class were scrapped because of age and obsolescence, the Radial Tanks became inextricably identified with the Lyme Regis line.

The two locomotives operated all the passenger and goods services on the line, and both were required to be operational except at the quietest times. In 1946 there was concern that overhaul of them was pressing, and a third locomotive of the class was procured. The LSWR had sold this engine to the East Kent Light Railway (then still independent); the Southern Railway (as successor to the LSWR) purchased it back for £800.

In British Railways days, there was again concern about the age and maintainability of the now elderly locomotives, and a former Great Western Railway 14XX 0-4-2T no. 1462 was trialled on the branch, but it was underpowered for the demands of the line.

In 1959, certain sections of track were renewed and some of the sharpest curves were eased, and the following year a former London, Midland and Scottish Railway 2-6-2T no 41297 was tried on the line (on 18 September 1960), and showed itself to be able to negotiate the curved line. Sister locomotive 41308 visited on 13 November 1960 and was tested with gradually increasing train loads up to six coaches, which it achieved successfully. Having enough power to obviate double-heading of the heaviest trains on the branch, engines of this class took over the work from 1960-1961.

Regular steam operation ceased in November 1963 when diesel multiple units took over, although there was a brief return of steam during a shortage of serviceable diesel units: 41291 and a Hawksworth auto-trailer operated the line in February 1965. The following month single-car diesel multiple units arrived and took over until closure of the line on 29 November.

== Operations ==
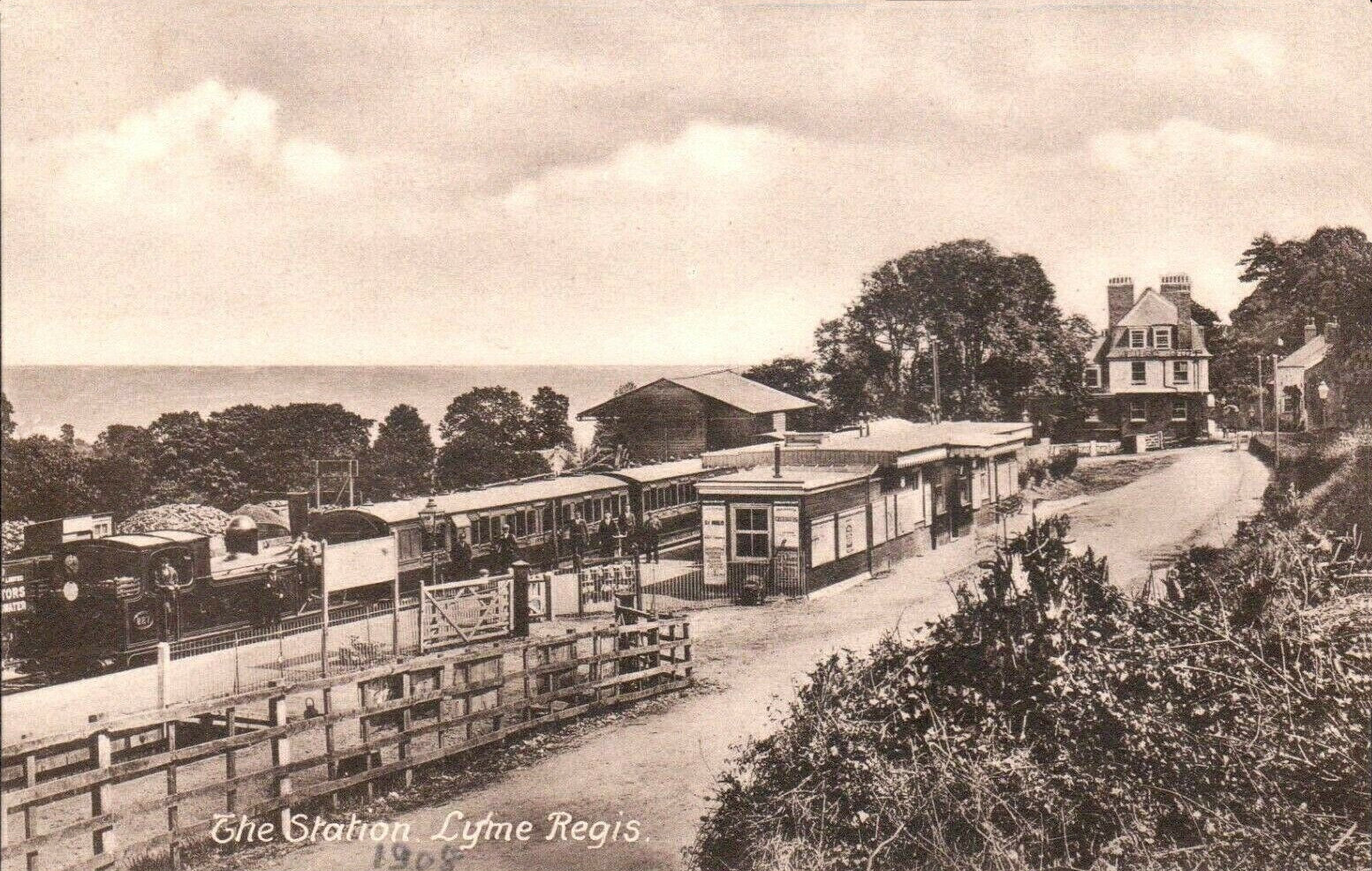
Train at Lyme Regis station

When the branch opened there were six return journeys every weekday—eight from 1907; in 1908 there were nine, of which two were goods trains and one was mixed. Summer Sunday trains were put on from 1930, and this peaked at eleven in 1938. The winter Sunday service was discontinued in 1951.

During the post-war years, the branch engines alternated, returning to and from Exmouth Junction locomotive shed (near Exeter) piloting a scheduled main line passenger or goods train. At the weekend in summer, the second engine arrived in time to assist with the heavy traffic. Through carriages from and to London trains were marshalled at Axminster, and both locomotives operated heavier trains—up to six coaches—over the branch itself.

As mentioned above, Combpyne was provided with a signal box from July 1906; Phillips refers to the station having a single platform, but also a passing loop. The signal box was closed—actually reduced to ground frame status—from 12 August 1921 and the loop became a siding.

Maggs says that this took place on 17 June 1930 and Mitchell and Smith say that the signal box and the northern points were removed in 1930 and the loop became single ended.

On 27 March 1960, the signalling system on the line reverted to "one engine in steam", with the Lyme Regis signal box being reduced to ground frame status.

== Cannington Viaduct ==
Cannington Viaduct is the only significant structure on the branch; it is 203 yards (186 m) long (Note: Williams states 182 yards (166 m) long) with ten elliptical arches of 50 feet (15 m) span, 92 feet (28 m) high. It was constructed of mass concrete with pre-cast concrete voussoirs; it was one of the earliest major structures of the type in England, and the second highest of the type. Cement was brought to the Cobb harbour at Lyme Regis, then to the construction site by a 1,000 foot (300 m) cableway. Crushed flint from locally excavated material was used for the aggregate. It was designed by A C Pain and built by Baldry and Yerbergh (Note: Spelling according to Otter; Maggs, Williams and Phillips have Yerburgh) of Westminster.

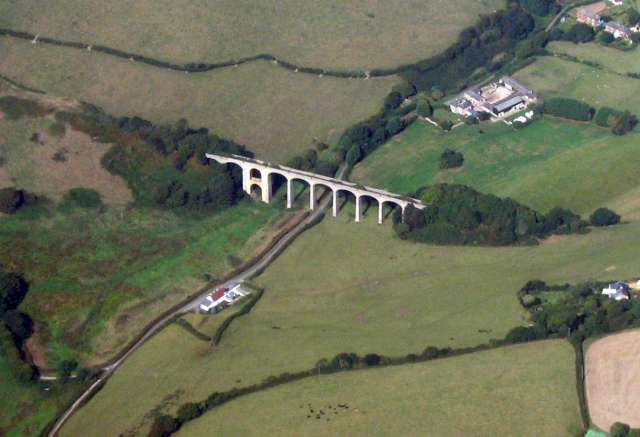
Cannington Viaduct

During its construction the west abutment and the adjacent pier slipped during the process of tipping fill material behind it, and it and the first pier settled significantly, distorting the first arch crown to rise, delaying the opening. The displaced foundations were stabilised and the third arch was strengthened by means of a diaphragm wall and a jack arch; the distorted first arch was given a brick arch ring. The line of the viaduct parapet shows a very significant drop at this end, but the structure had been stabilised and did not move further.

== Track ==
When the line was constructed, the track had been light, using flat bottom rails spiked directly to the sleepers. The very sharp curves led to gauge spreading, even under the short wheelbase of the Terrier locomotives, and in 1910 the track was relaid in bullhead material. A second renewal took place later, in Southern Railway days, and a further time in association with easing and recanting of the most difficult curves in 1959.

== Closure ==
Passenger use declined in the years following the Second World War, and only summer weekends remained busy. When the report The Reshaping of British Railways (often referred to as the "Beeching Axe") was produced, the line was included for closure, and this was implemented on 29 November 1965.

The main station building at Lyme Regis was wooden, and after closure it was dismantled and re-erected at Alresford station, on the Watercress Line in Hampshire. The imposing Cannington Viaduct is a Grade II listed structure.

There is a proposal to build a narrow gauge line between Axminster and a park and ride on the coastal road to Seaton, part of which would use part of the trackbed of the former Lyme Regis branch.

In January 2019, Campaign for Better Transport released a report identifying the line was listed as Priority 2 for reopening. Priority 2 is for those lines which require further development or a change in circumstances (such as housing developments).

== Gallery ==
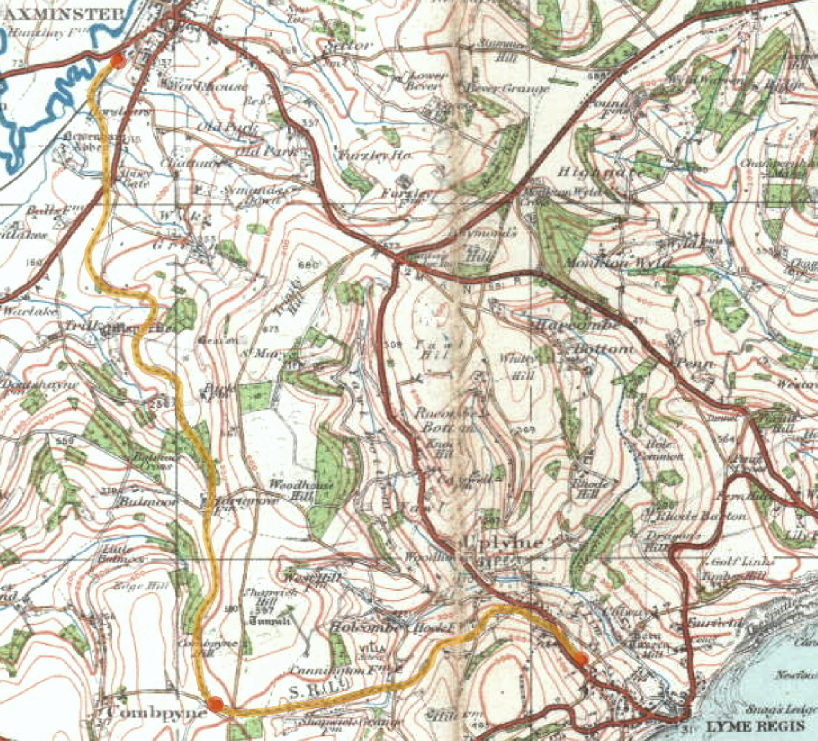
Map of line in 1919, showing sharp curves (grid squares of 2 mi (3.2 km), contours 50 ft (15 m))

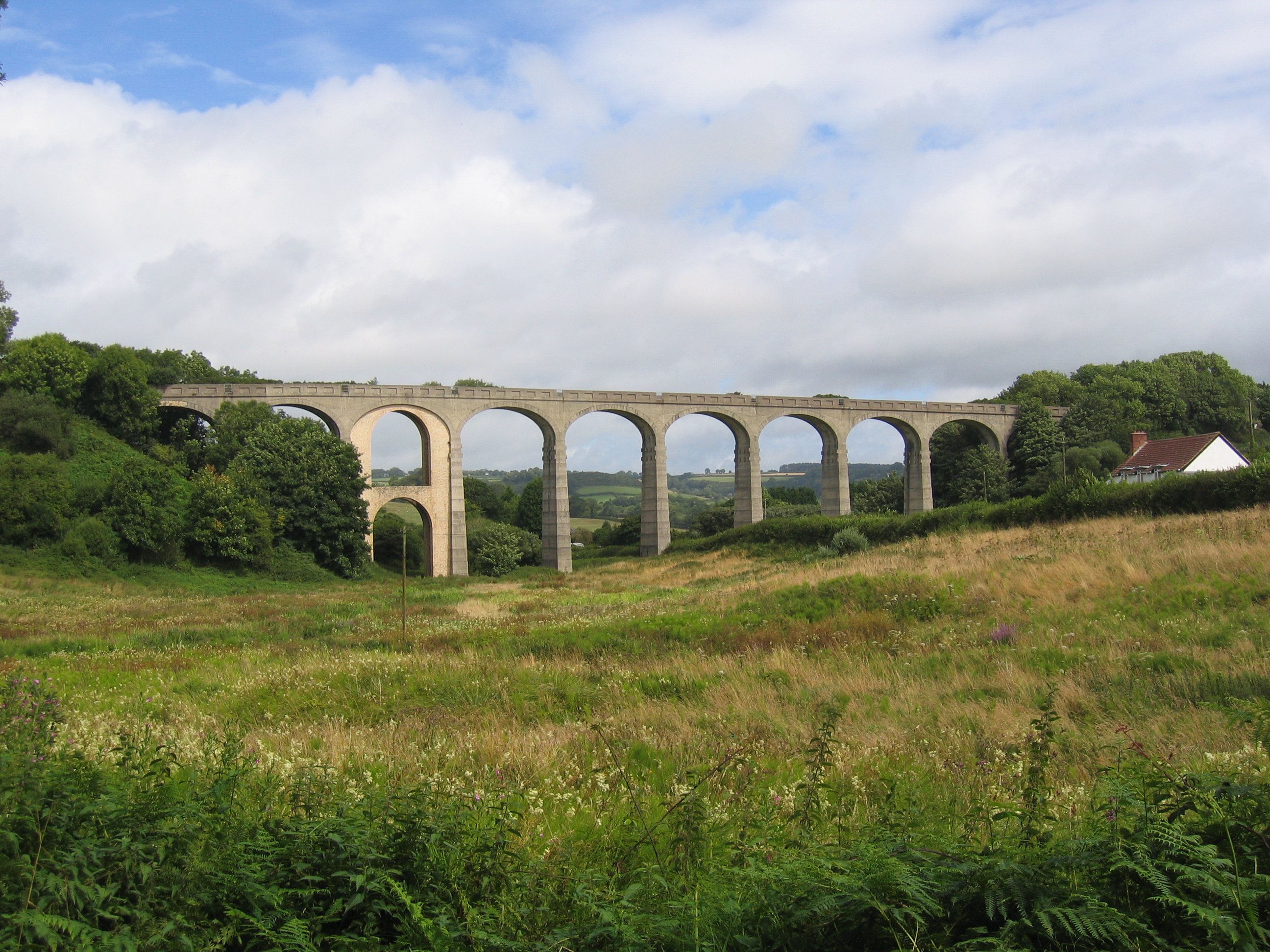
Cannington viaduct, near Uplyme, showing brick reinforcing arch after subsidence

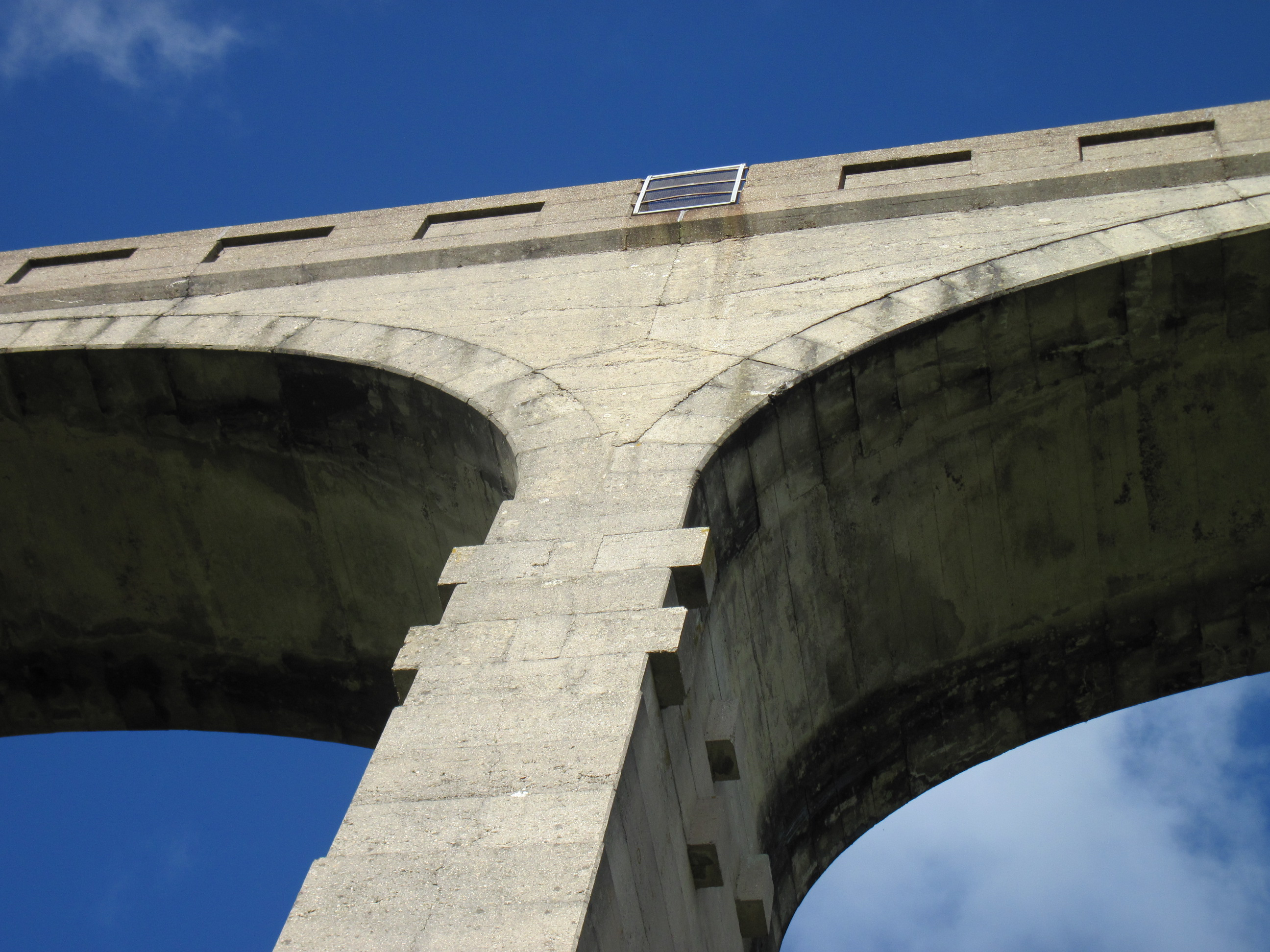
Cannington Viaduct close up of arch

== See also ==
- Southern Railway routes west of Salisbury
