= Lyme Regis =

Coastal town in Dorset, England

Coordinates: 50°43′30″N 2°56′07″W

Lyme Regis: Lyme
- View of Lyme Regis over the Victoria pier

- Coat of arms of Lyme Regis

- Location within Dorset
- Population: 3,742 (2021 census)
- OS grid reference: SY337922
  - London: 135 miles (217 km) ENE
- Civil parish: Lyme Regis
- Unitary authority: Dorset
- Ceremonial county: Dorset
- Region: South West
- Country: England
- Sovereign state: United Kingdom
- Post town: Lyme Regis
- Postcode district: DT7
- Dialling code: 01297
- Police: Dorset
- Fire: Dorset and Wiltshire
- Ambulance: South Western
- UK Parliament: West Dorset
- Website: Love Lyme Regis

Lyme Regis (/ˌlaɪm ˈriːdʒɪs/ LYME REE-jiss) is a seaside town in west Dorset, England, 25 miles (40 km) west of Dorchester and east of Exeter. Sometimes dubbed the "Pearl of Dorset", it lies by the English Channel at the Dorset–Devon border. It has noted fossils in cliffs and beaches on the Jurassic Coast, a World Heritage Site and heritage coast. The harbour wall, known as The Cobb, appears in Jane Austen's novel Persuasion, the John Fowles novel The French Lieutenant's Woman and the 1981 film of that name, partly shot in the town.

A former mayor and MP was Admiral Sir George Somers, who founded the English colonial settlement of Somers Isles, now Bermuda, where Lyme Regis is twinned with St George's. In July 2015, Lyme Regis joined Jamestown, Virginia, in a Historic Atlantic Triangle with St George's. The 2021 census gave the town a population of 3,742.

== History ==
In Saxon times, the abbots of Sherborne Abbey had salt-boiling rights on land adjacent to the River Lym, and the abbey once owned part of the town. Lyme is mentioned in the Domesday Book of 1086. In the 13th century, it developed as one of the major British ports. A royal charter was granted by King Edward I in 1284 when "Regis" was added to the town's name. The charter was confirmed by Queen Elizabeth I in 1591.

John Leland visited in the 16th century and described Lyme as "a praty market town set in the rootes of an high rokky hille down to the hard shore. There cummith a shalow broke from the hilles about a three miles by north, and cummith fleting on great stones through a stone bridge in the bottom."

In 1644, during the English Civil War, Parliamentarians withstood an eight-week siege of the town by Royalist forces under Prince Maurice. The Duke of Monmouth landed at Lyme Regis at the start of the Monmouth Rebellion in 1685.

Lyme grew in size as a result of seaside tourism in the 18th century bought about by new purported health benefits of the sea air/taking the waters, and the establishment of the turnpike road system. The town then benefited at the expense of continental destinations during the Napoleonic Wars when wealthy tourists were unable to travel abroad. This led notable people including Jane Austen to visit, who set part of her final novel Persuasion in the town; and quoted the place as her "happiest spot for watching the flow of the tide."

The population was 3,376 by the time of the 1841 census.

Between 1811 and her death in 1847 Mary Anning, a geological pioneer, found and identified Jurassic marine reptile fossils in cliffs to the east of Lyme Regis.

On New Year's Day, 1915, HMS Formidable was torpedoed, the first major U-boat kill of World War I. A local lifeboat delivered bodies to the Pilot Boat Inn in Bridge Street. Lassie, the owner's dog, licked the face of Seaman Cowan, who was believed dead, and seemingly brought him back to life. The namesake of this cross-breed became a legend of books, radio, film and television.

In 1965, the town's railway station was closed under the Beeching Axe. The station was dismantled and rebuilt at Alresford, on the Mid Hants Watercress Railway in Hampshire. The route to Lyme Regis was notable for being operated by aged Victorian locomotives. One of these Adams Radial Tank engines is now preserved on the Bluebell Railway in Sussex. A West Country Class steam locomotive No. 34009 was named "Lyme Regis" after the town.

In 2005, one event to mark the bicentenary of Admiral Nelson's victory at the Battle of Trafalgar was a re-enactment of the arrival of the news aboard the Bermuda sloop HMS Pickle.

== Geography ==
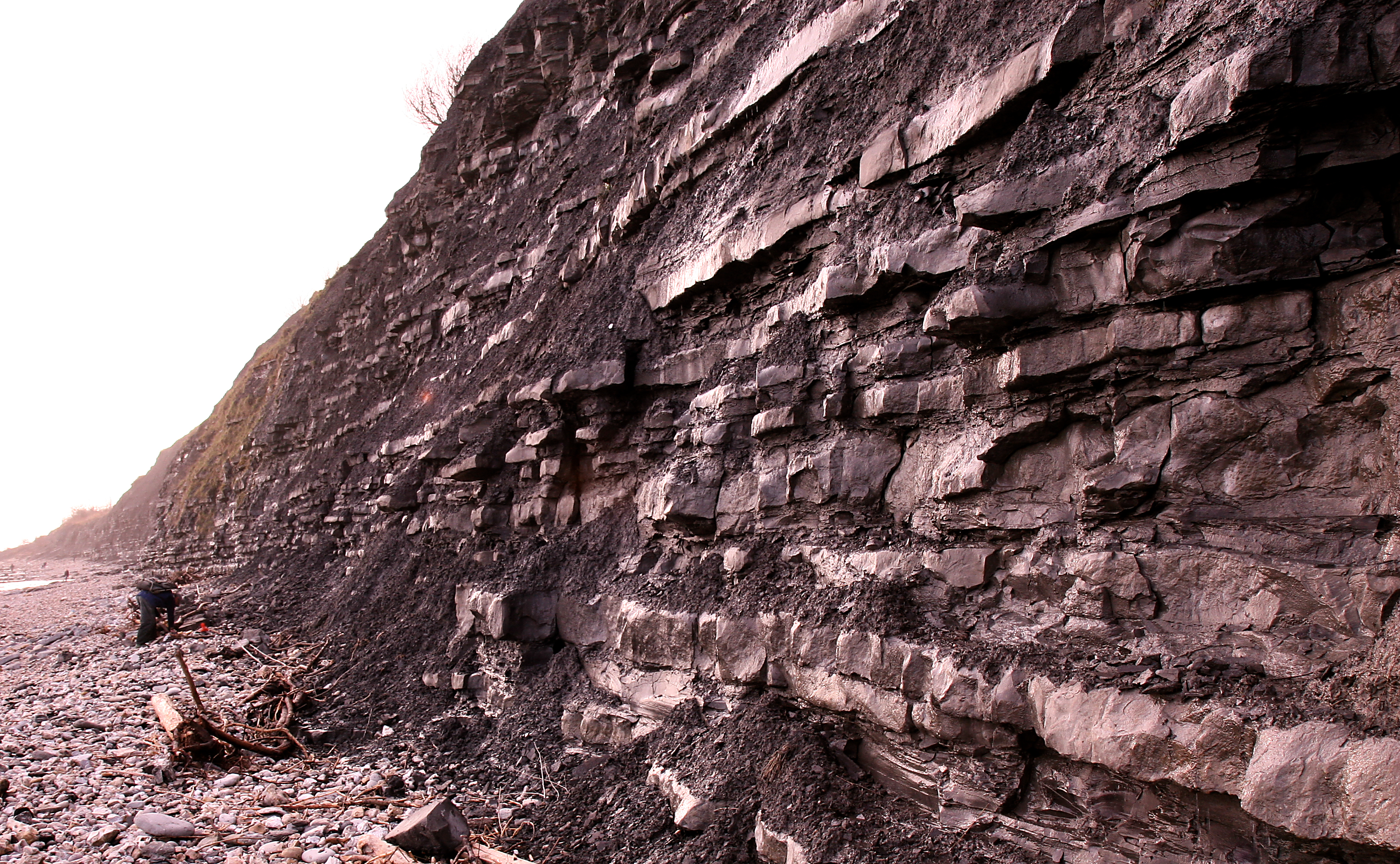
Blue Lias cliffs at Lyme Regis

Lyme Regis is a coastal town in West Dorset, 25 miles (40 km) west of Dorchester and 25 miles (40 km) east of Exeter. It lies in Lyme Bay, on the English Channel coast at the Dorset–Devon border. At the 2011 census, it had a population of 3,671. The town has grown around the mouth of the River Lim (or Lym) which drops from a plateau at an altitude of about 200 m (660 ft) before flowing around 5–6 km (3–4 mi) south and south-east to the sea. Its name is of British origin and probably cognate with the Welsh llif meaning flood or stream. Historically there were mills along its length. Its lower reaches coincide with sections of three recreational footpaths: the Wessex Ridgeway, Liberty Trail and East Devon Trail.

The town's beaches and cliffs are noted for fossils. They form part of the local Heritage Coast and the more extensive coastal World Heritage Site, commonly referred to as the Jurassic Coast – stretching for 153 kilometres (95 mi) from Orcombe Point near Exmouth in the west to Old Harry Rocks in the east. The coastal exposures provide a continuous sequence of Triassic, Jurassic and Cretaceous rock formations spanning some 185 million years of the Earth's history. Localities along the Jurassic Coast include a range of important fossil zones.

The Blue Lias and Charmouth Mudstone geological formations host a multitude of remains from the Early Jurassic, from which epoch good fossil records are rare. Many remains are well preserved, including complete specimens of important species. Many of the earliest discoveries of dinosaur and other prehistoric reptile remains were made in the area around Lyme Regis, notably those discovered by Mary Anning (1799–1847). Significant finds include Ichthyosaurus, Plesiosaurus, Dimorphodon, Scelidosaurus (one of the first armoured dinosaurs) and Dapedium. The town holds an annual Mary Anning Day and Lyme Regis Fossil Festival. A fossil of the world's largest moth was discovered there in 1966.

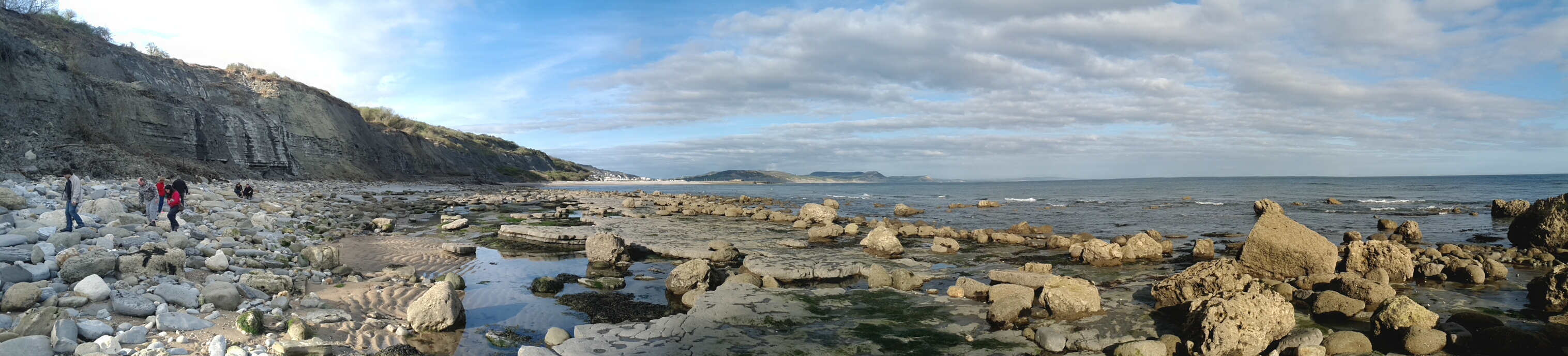
People collecting fossils in Lyme Regis at the fossil festival

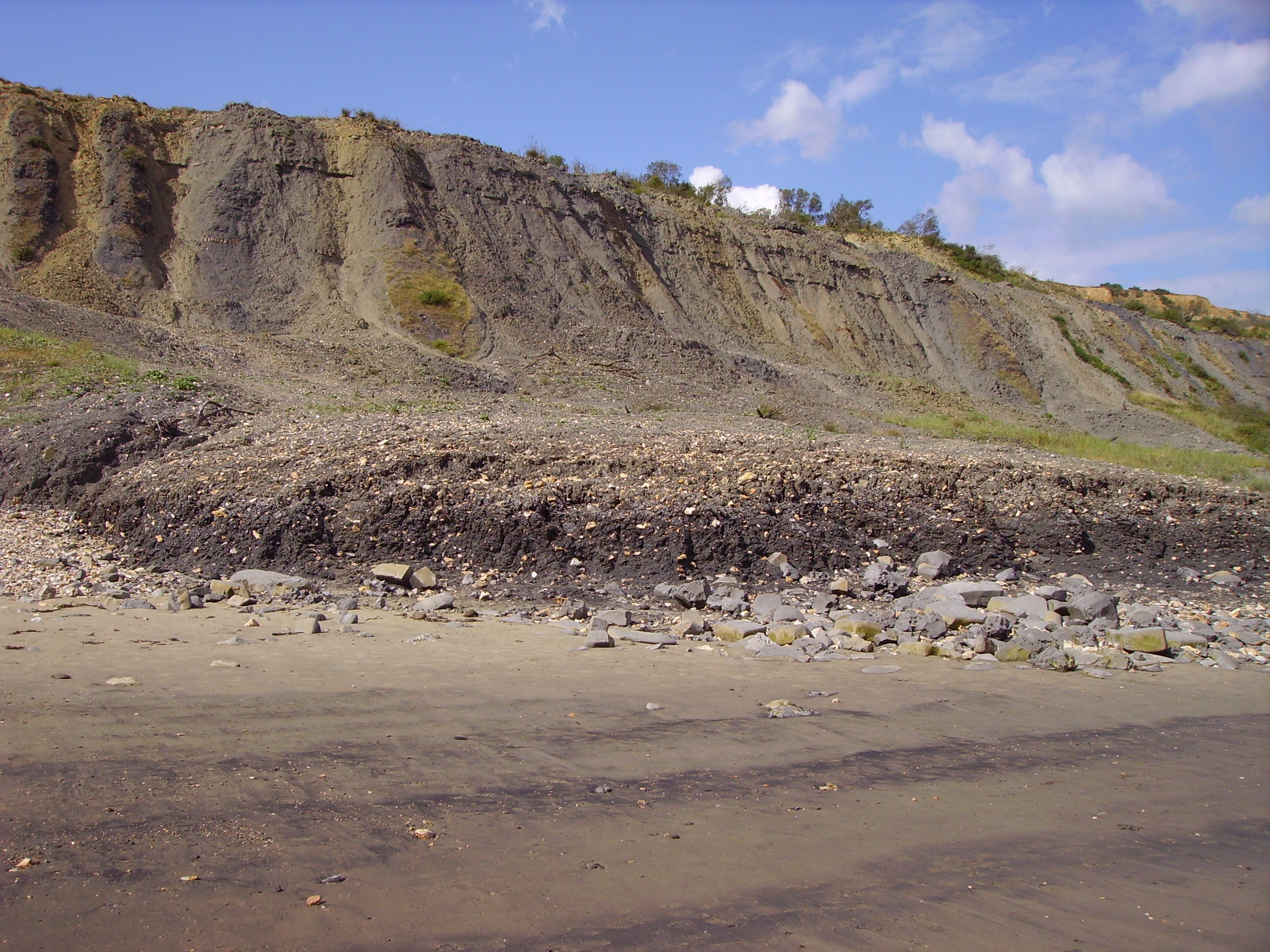
Landslip, east of Lyme Regis

To the south-west are Poker's Pool, Seven Rock Point and Pinhay Bay and to the north-east is Charmouth. The coast is subject to landslips that expose the Jurassic-age fossils to be found on the beaches. "The Dowlands Landslip" occurred on 24 December 1839, 3 miles (4.8 km) west along the coast in Devon, in an area belonging to Bindon Manor. About 45 acres (18 ha) of wheat and turnip fields were dislodged when a great chasm more than 300 feet (91 m) across, 160 feet (49 m) deep and 0.75 miles (1.21 km) long was formed. The crops remained intact on the top of what became known as "Goat Island" among the newly formed gullies. On 3 February 1840 a smaller landslip occurred nearby. The phenomenon attracted many visitors, and farmers charged sixpence to view it. The area is now known as The Undercliff and is of interest for its diverse natural history.

Landslides continued to cause problems in the area into the 21st century. In 2005, work began on a £16 million engineering project to stabilise the cliffs and protect the town from coastal erosion. The town's main beach was relaid and reopened on 1 July 2006. On the evening of 6 May 2008, a 400 metres (1,300 ft) section of land slipped onto the beach between Lyme Regis and Charmouth. Police described the landslip as the "worst in 100 years". It called for diverting the South West Coast Path inland between Lyme Regis and Charmouth via the Lyme Regis Golf Course.

== Demography ==
In the 2021 census, the town's parish had a population of 3,742.

Census population of Lyme Regis parish
Census	Population	Female	Male	Households	Source
1921	2,882				
1931	2,620				
1951	3,200				
1961	3,526				
1971	3,400				
1981	3,450				
1991	3,760				
2001	3,513	1,918	1,595	1,660	
2011	3,671	2,028	1,643	1,770	
2021	3,742	1,964	1,778	1,840	

== Transport ==
Lyme Regis railway station served the town between 1903 and 1965; it was a stop on the Lyme Regis branch line to Axminster. The nearest National Rail station is now at Axminster, 6 miles (10 km) away, with South Western Railway services to London Waterloo, Salisbury and Exeter St Davids.

Bus services are operated predominantly by First Hampshire & Dorset, with routes connecting the town to Axminster station, Beer, Bridport, Seaton and Weymouth.

== Religion ==
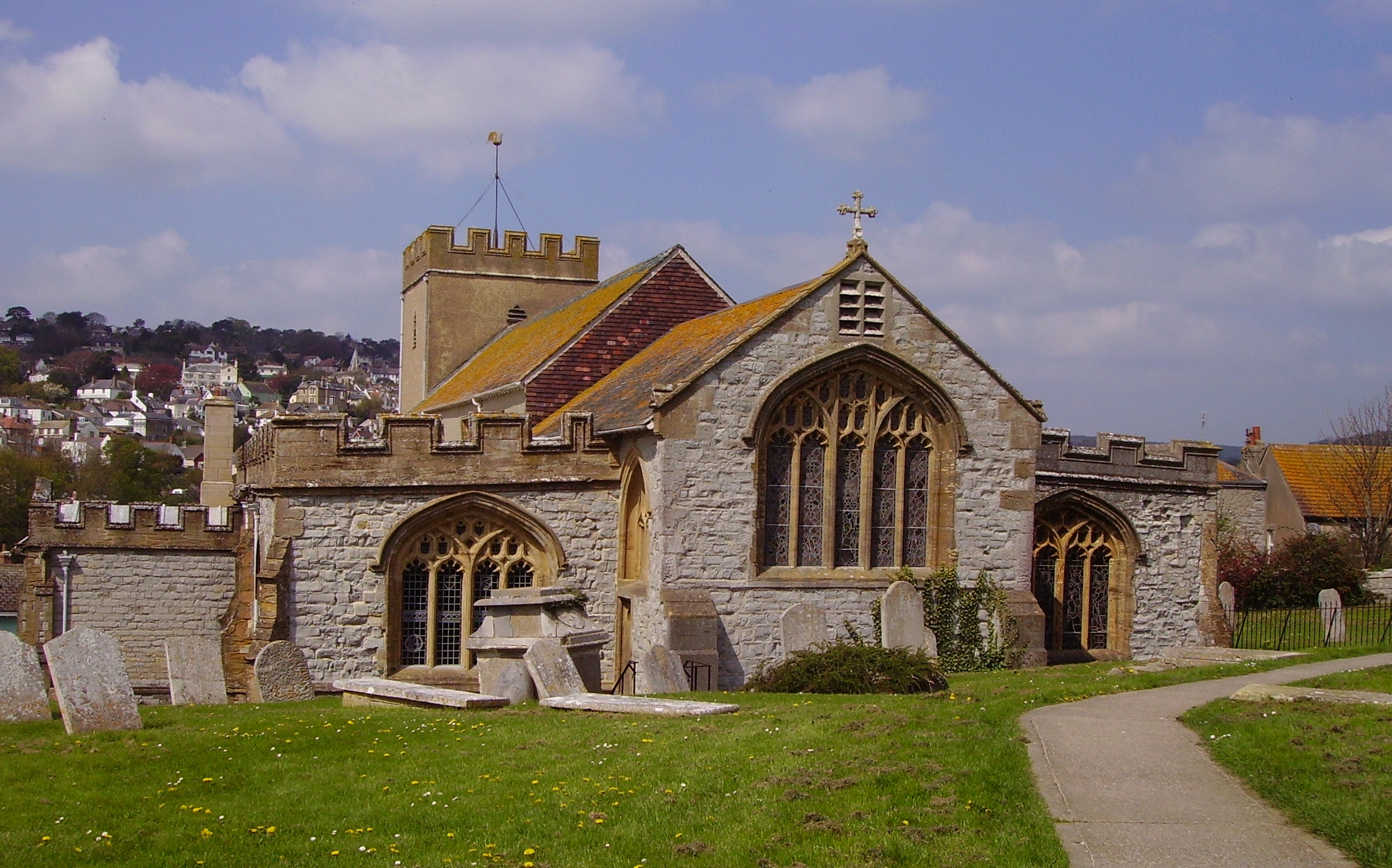
St Michael's Church

The parish church of St Michael the Archangel, above Church Cliff, dominates the old town. Dating from the 12th century, it was originally a tripartite structure with an axial tower. Transepts were added in about 1200 and two aisles in the 13th century. A new church was built east of the tower and transepts early in the 16th century and the old chancel and aisles removed. The old nave was shortened in the 19th century.

Mary Anning is buried there and commemorated in a stained-glass window provided by members of the Geological Society of London, an organisation that did not admit women until 1904.

The Baptist church was founded in 1653 and has been on the same site since 1699. Bethany Chapel, an independent Evangelical (Christian Brethren) church, celebrated its centenary in 2014.

== Education ==
The Boat Building Academy, a registered charity runs courses in traditional boatbuilding and furniture making from its site at Monmouth Beach.

== Governance ==
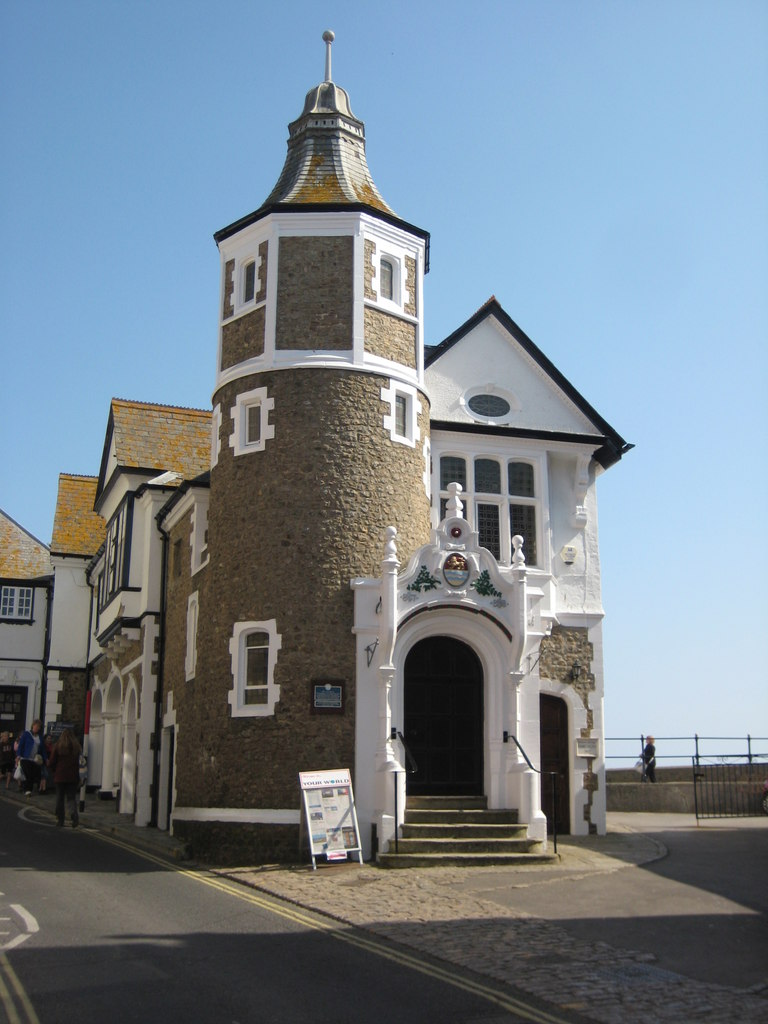
Lyme Regis Guildhall

There are two tiers of local government covering Lyme Regis, at parish (town) and unitary authority level: Lyme Regis Town Council and Dorset Council. The town council meets at the Guildhall on Bridge Street, which was completed in 1889. The town council's offices are at the nearby Guildhall Cottage on Church Street.

Lyme Regis was an ancient borough, with the earliest known charter dating from 1284. Until 1604 the borough only covered a small part of the parish; in that year the borough was extended to match the parish. The borough was reformed to become a municipal borough in 1836 under the Municipal Corporations Act 1835. The municipal borough was abolished in 1974 to become part of the new district of West Dorset. The modern town council was created as a successor parish council for the old borough at the same time.

West Dorset was abolished in 2019 under the 2019 structural changes to local government in England, when Dorset Council was established as a unitary authority. Since then, Lyme Regis has been part of the Lyme and Charmouth ward which elects one member to Dorset Council.

Lyme Regis is part of the West Dorset constituency for elections to the House of Commons. From 1295 to 1868 it was covered by the Lyme Regis constituency.

== Landmarks ==
=== The Cobb ===
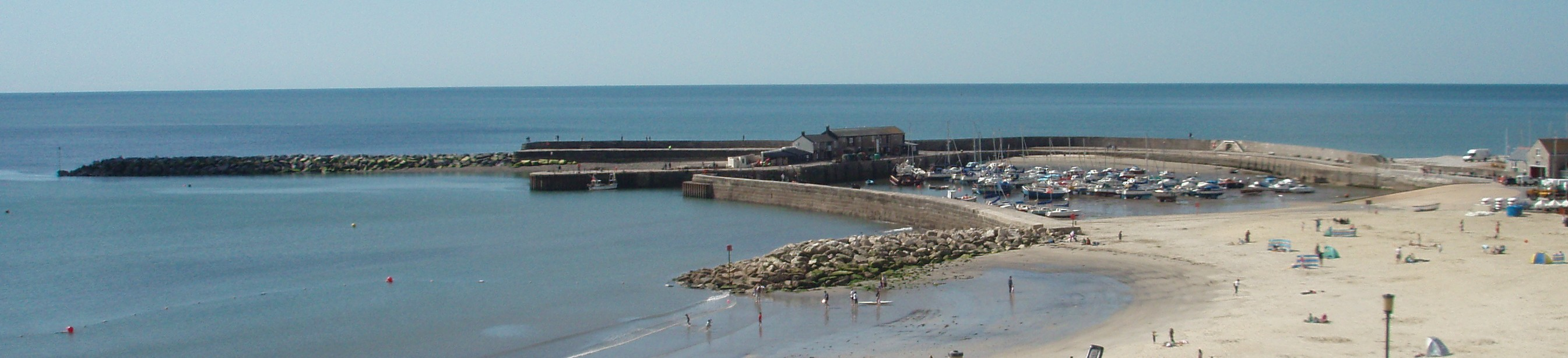
The Cobb, with boats grounded in the harbour at low tide

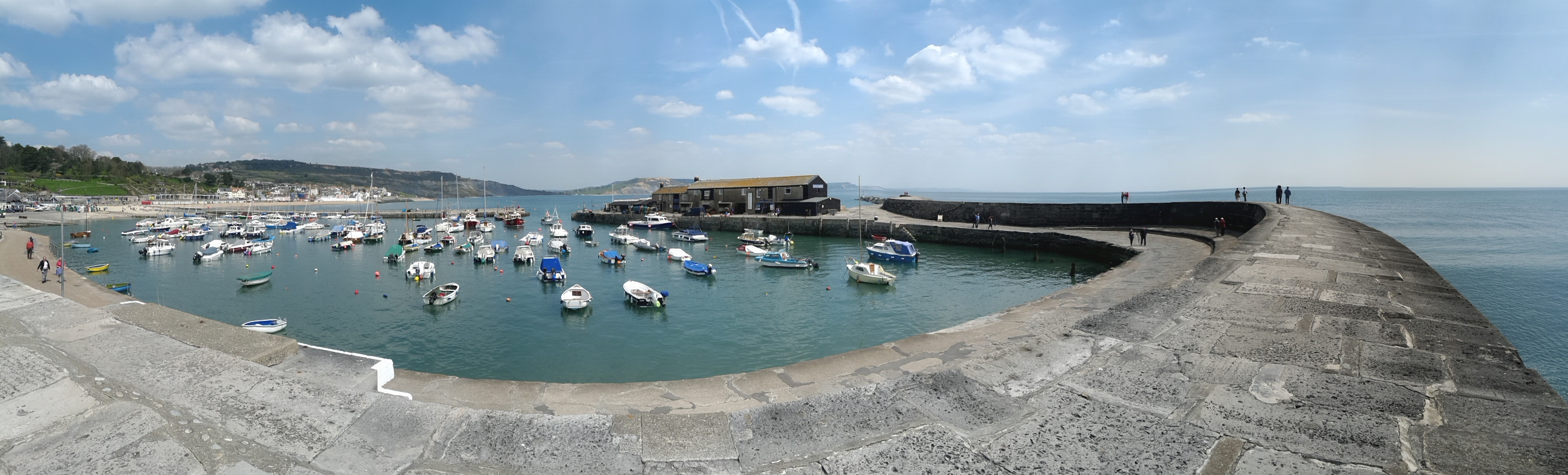
View from the Cobb

The first record of the Cobb, the town's harbour wall, is in a 1328 document describing it as having been damaged by storms. It was made of oak piles driven into the seabed, with boulders stacked between. The boulders had been floated into place, tied between empty barrels. A 1685 account describes it as, "an immense mass of stone, of a shape of a demi-lune, with a bar in the middle of the concave: no one stone that lies there was ever touched with a tool or bedded in any sort of cement, but all the pebbles of the see are piled up, and held by their bearings only, and the surge plays in and out through the interstices of the stone in a wonderful manner." The Cobb wall provides a breakwater to shield the town from storms and separate Monmouth and Cobb Gate beaches.

The Cobb had economic importance in and around the town, creating an artificial harbour that enabled the town to develop as a port and shipbuilding centre from the 13th century onwards. Shipbuilding was significant between 1780 and 1850; nearly 100 ships were launched, including the 12-gun Royal Navy brig HMS Snap. Well-sited for trade with France, the port's most prosperous period was from the 16th century until the end of the 18th. In 1780, the port was larger than the Port of Liverpool but its importance declined in the 19th century, as it could not handle ships of increasing size.

The Cobb has been destroyed or damaged by storms several times; it was swept away in 1377, along with 50 boats and 80 houses. The southern arm was added in the 1690s and rebuilt in 1793 after it was destroyed in a storm the previous year. It is thought that mortar was used in the Cobb's construction for the first time in this rebuilding. It was reconstructed in 1820 using Portland Admiralty Roach, a type of Portland stone. After the Great Storm of 1824, Captain Sir Richard Spencer RN carried out pioneering lifeboat design work in Cobb harbour. The current Lyme Regis Lifeboat Station was opened in 1997.

=== Lyme Regis Marine Aquarium ===
Open since the late 1950s, Lyme Regis Marine Aquarium occupies an early 18th-century stone building on the Cobb harbour wall. The aquarium showcases some of the abundant local sea life and offers insight into Lyme's rich maritime history.

Visitors have opportunities to hand-feed a shoal of tame Thicklip grey mullet, stroke a lobster, and hold a starfish. Other exhibits include weaver fish, wrasse, blenny, sea mice and crustaceans, including hermit crab.

=== Other landmarks ===
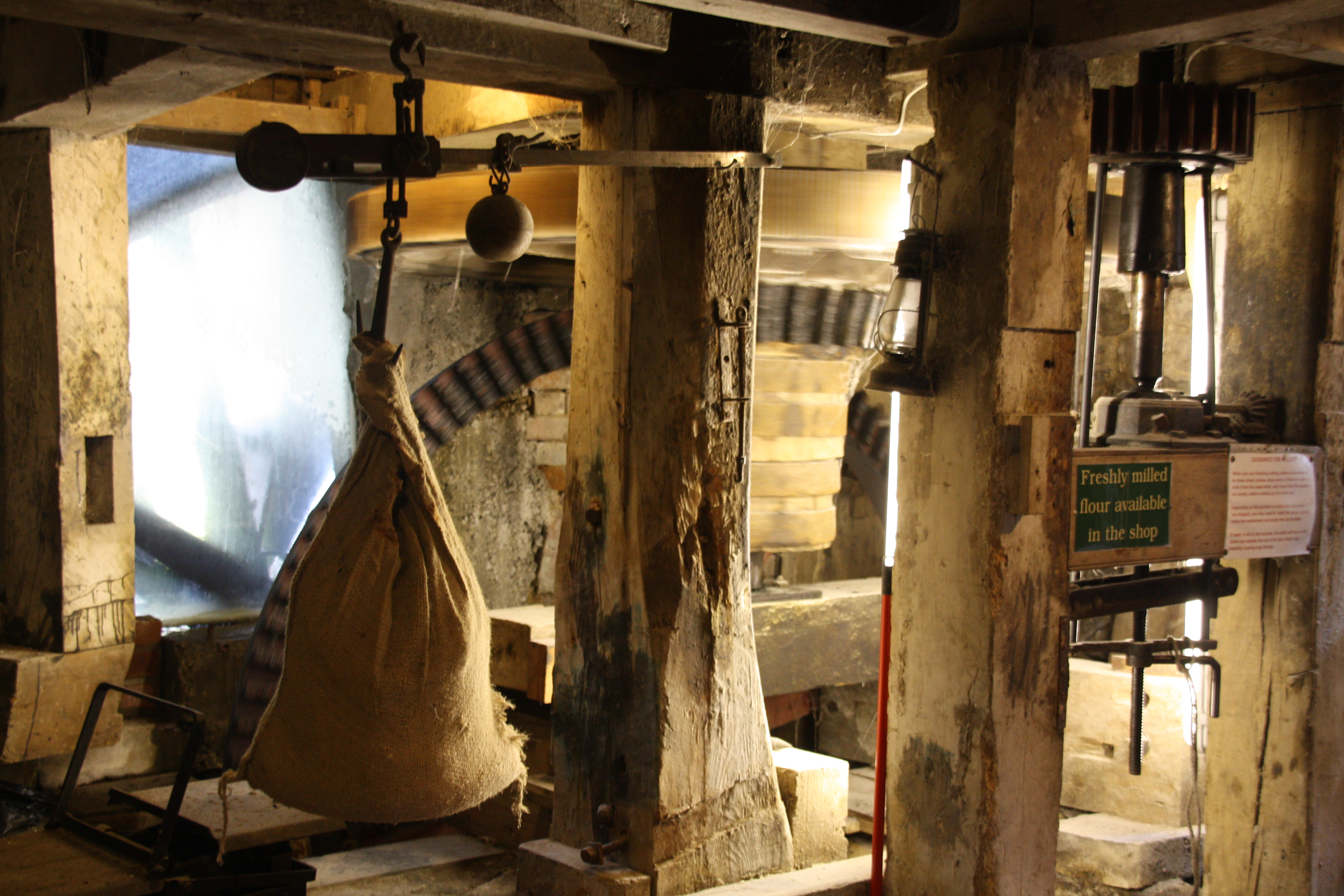
Interior of the mill

Town Mill, a watermill dating from 1340, has been restored to working order and produces flour. It is powered by water from the River Lym via a leat running along a lynch. The Domesday Book records a mill at Lyme in 1086, so the site could be much older. Town Mill Brewery opened in part of the mill in March 2010.

Near the Town Mill, on the site of an old chapel dedicated to St Mary and the Holy Spirits, is the "Lepers' Well". In medieval times "leper" was used as a general description of skin diseases, not necessarily leprosy. A hospital that stood on the site 700 years ago is commemorated by a plaque on the wall of the well. The well water still runs, but probably at a reduced rate. The land was left untouched for many years before it was landscaped as a visitors' garden in the 1970s.

The frontage of the Three Cups Hotel in Broad Street dates from 1807. It is believed that Jane Austen stayed in Hiscott's Boarding House on the same site in 1804. Since then the hotel has accommodated Alfred Lord Tennyson, Henry Wadsworth Longfellow, Hilaire Belloc, G. K. Chesterton and J. R. R. Tolkien, who spent several holidays there. In 1944 General Eisenhower delivered an important briefing before D-Day to senior Allied officers in its first-floor lounge. It was used as a setting in the film The French Lieutenant's Woman in 1981. The owners, Palmers Brewery of Bridport, closed the hotel in May 1990 and put forward plans to demolish the significantly historic rear of the building and replace it with retail units, a restaurant, and visitor and private accommodation.

The Royal Lion Hotel is a former coaching inn dating from the first decade of the 17th century. It is reputedly haunted; many alleged ectoplasms have been sighted in the corridors and cold spots.

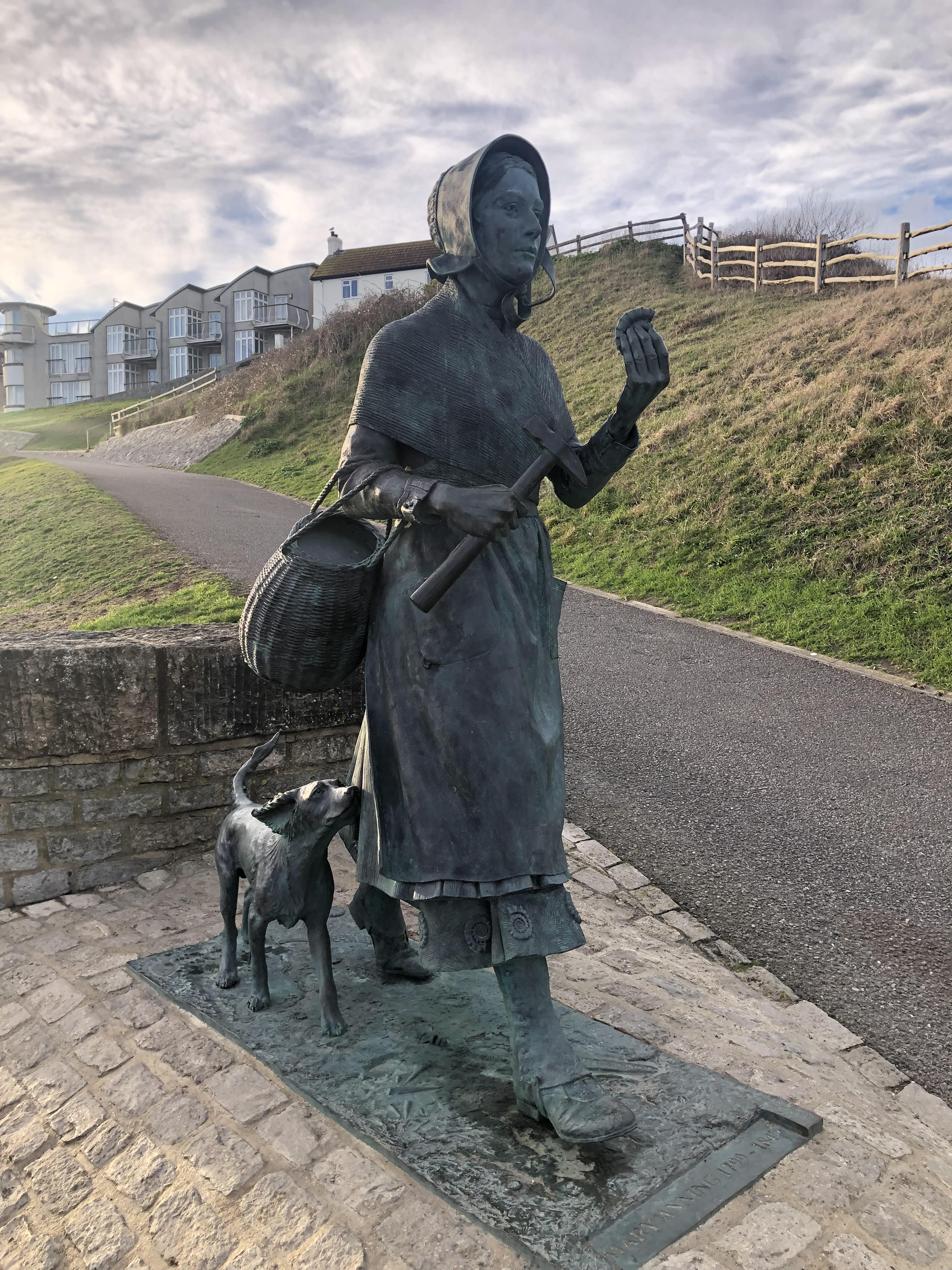
Mary Anning's Statue

On 22 May 2022 a new Statue of Mary Anning was unveiled by Alice Roberts at the junction of Long Entry and Gun Cliff Walk. The statue was the result of a crowdfunded campaign ("Mary Anning Rocks") to commission and display a statue to the paleontologist Mary Anning in Lyme Regis.

== Culture and media ==
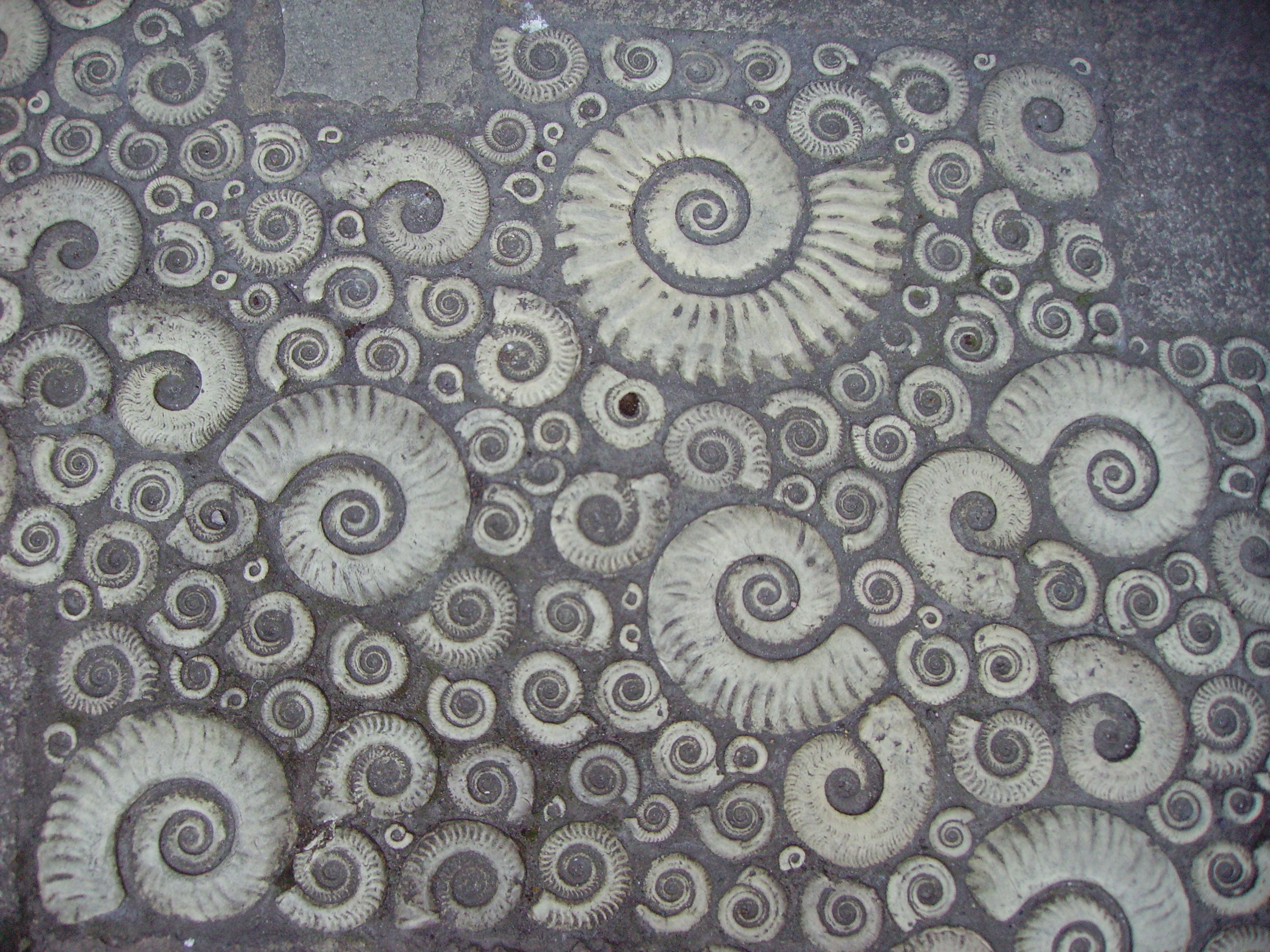
Coade stone decorated with an ammonite pattern

The museum stands on the site of Mary Anning's birthplace and family shop off Bridge Street, holding a collection of local memorabilia, historical items and exhibits to explain the local geological and palaeontological treasures. It was formerly known as the Philpot Museum. Set into the pavement outside the museum is an example of Coade stone work, in the form of ammonites, reflecting the palaeontology for which the town is famous. It commemorates Eleanor Coade, who had an 18th-century artificial stone factory in London and a seaside home, Belmont, in the town.

The Dinosaurland Fossil Museum is in the former church where Mary Anning was baptised.

Thanksgiving Day has been held since Parliament decreed, at the end of the English Civil War, as a day of celebration and prayer in Lyme to mark its victory over the long siege of the town by Royalist forces. The celebration includes residents dressed in period costume to parade through the streets.

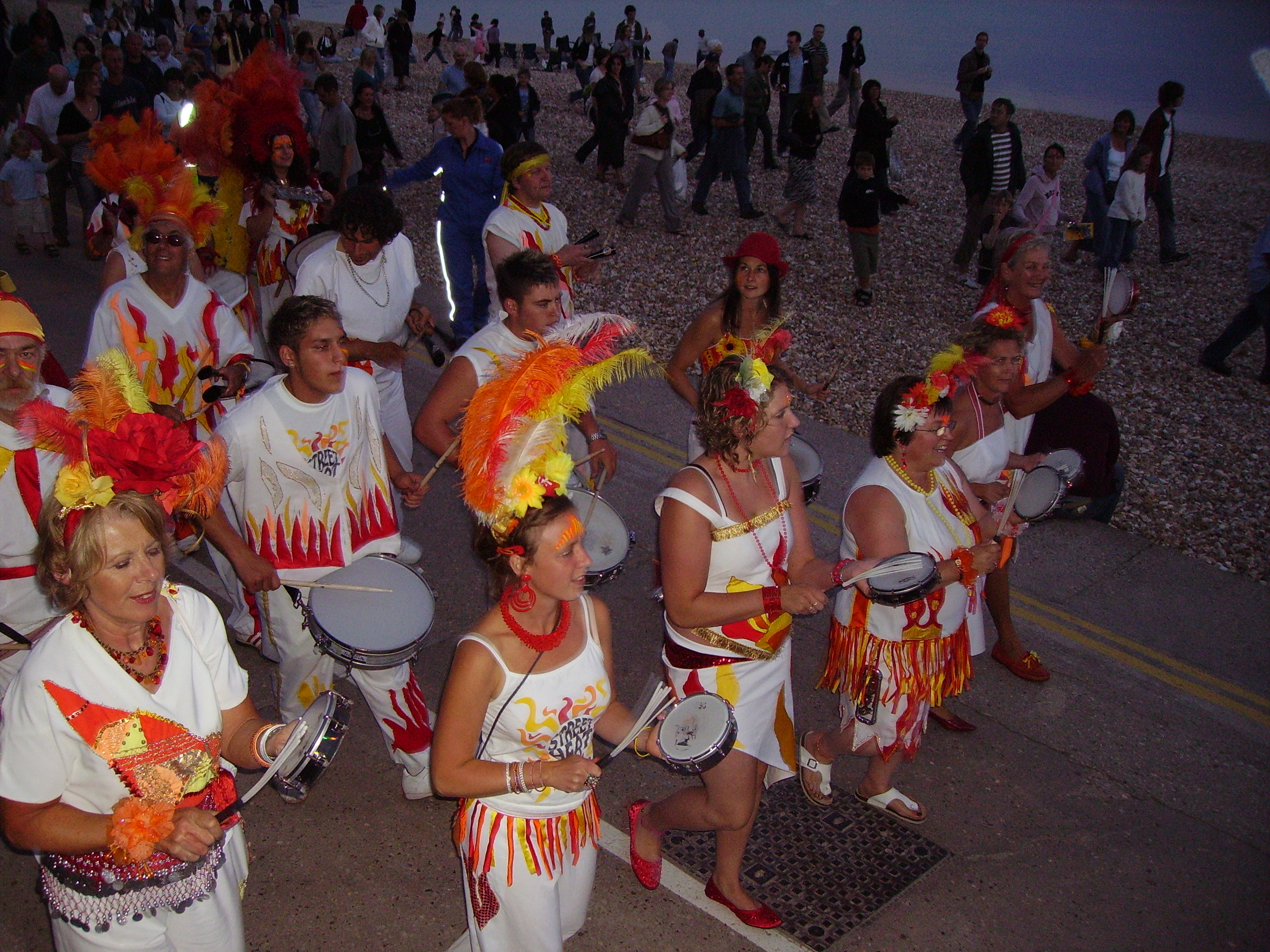
The samba band Street Heat, in the twilight parade marking the end of the 2006 'Lyme Regis Carnival'

Annual events include the Lyme Regis Carnival and Regatta, the Lyme Regis Fossil Festival (in conjunction with the London Natural History Museum), and Mary Anning Day. The traditional conger cuddling event takes place during Lifeboat Week. The carnival and regatta, organised by volunteers, take place over a week in August, as does the Lyme Regis Gig Club regatta.

Bonfire night celebrations include a torchlight procession, a bonfire on the beach and a firework display. A Christmas Tree Festival has more than 30 trees decorated and displayed in Lyme Regis Baptist Church. An Easter bonnet parade takes place in the town on Easter Sunday. A May Day fête features stalls and entertainment from various groups in Lyme.

Lyme Regis is the home of B Sharp, a music charity for young people. It runs music workshops, performances and training, and signposts progression routes beyond B Sharp. It also runs an annual Busking Festival open to all performing artists, now in May, and an open air "Big Mix" festival in July to present music-making by young people.

The Marine Theatre, operated by the charity Lymearts Community Trust, stages a variety of live events.

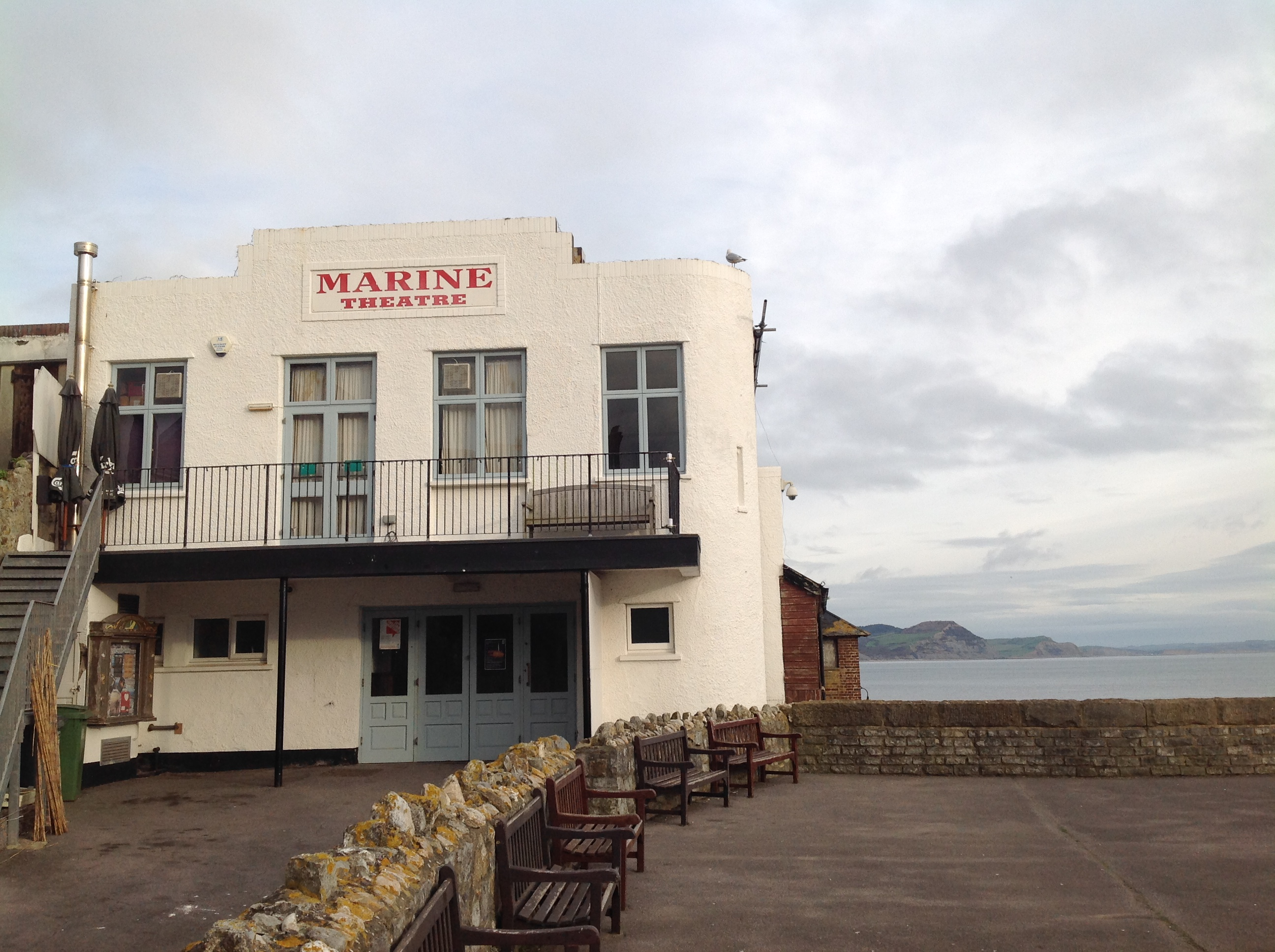
Marine Theatre in Lyme Regis

In 2012 graffiti artist Banksy stenciled an origami crane on a wall adjacent to the River Lym at the intersection of Mill and Coombe Streets.

Local TV coverage is provided by BBC South West and ITV West Country. Television signals are received from the Stockland Hill transmitting station and the local relay transmitter situated in Charmouth.

Local radio stations are BBC Radio Solent, Heart West, Wessex FM, and Lyme Bay Radio, a community based station.

The town is served by the local newspaper, Bridport & Lyme Regis News.

=== Literature and films ===
The Cobb featured in Jane Austen's novel Persuasion (1818), and in the 1960 television miniseries, 1971 TV series, 1995 film, 2007 film and 2022 film based on the novel. The poet Tennyson is said to have gone straight to the Cobb on arrival, saying, "Show me the exact spot where Louisa Musgrove fell!". The Cobb also featured in the 1981 film The French Lieutenant's Woman, based on the 1969 novel of the same name by John Fowles. The town was used in filming All Over the Town (1949), under the name "Tormouth".

The town community is portrayed in disguise in The Earl's Granddaughter (1895) by Georgina Castle Smith, writing as Emma. It also features in A. S. Byatt's Booker Prize-winning 1990 novel Possession and the 2002 film adapted from it. Lyme Regis is the setting for much of the historical novel Remarkable Creatures by Tracy Chevalier, of which fossil hunter Mary Anning is a protagonist.

Lyme Regis is the setting and filming location of a 2020 film Ammonite, starring Kate Winslet as Mary Anning alongside Saoirse Ronan and Fiona Shaw. The 2023 film Wonka, starring Timothée Chalamet, was filmed in Lyme Regis.

== Sport ==
Lyme Regis Football Club, known as the Seasiders, was formed in 1885. Its three senior and five junior teams play at the Davey Fort Ground in Charmouth Road. The seniors play in the Devon and Exeter Football League and Perry Street and District League. In its 125th anniversary year, 2010, Tony Cottee (a former West Ham, Everton and England striker) was made club patron.

== Notable people ==
In birth order:

- George Somers (1554–1610), English naval officer, was knighted and appointed Admiral of the Virginia Company.
- Bartholomew Westley (1596–1680), nonconformist preacher, was buried here.
- Thomas Coram (c. 1688–1751) founded the Foundling Hospital in London.
- John Talbot (c. 1769 – 7 July 1851). Naval officer who served under Nelson 1784 on HMS Boreas, and with distinction in Revolutionary and Napoleonic Wars, and War of 1812.
- Elizabeth Philpot (1780–1857), fossil collector, amateur palaeontologist and artist, lived in Lyme Regis for most of her adult life.
- Mary Anning (1799–1847) was a pioneering fossil hunter on the Lyme Regis coast.
- Abraham Hayward (1801–1884), writer and essayist, who brought a landmark case in the 1840s for residents to maintain a permanent right of way across the cliffs to Axmouth and Seaton.
- John Gould (1804–1881), an artist and ornithologist born in Lyme Regis, wrote and illustrated 18 books on birds. The Gould League is named after him.
- John Henry Nicholson (1838-1923), writer, teacher and poet was born in the town.
- Georgina Castle Smith (1845–1933), children's writer, died and was buried here in 1933.
- Percy Gilchrist (1851–1935), metallurgist born in Lyme Regis, was notable for his work on steel production.
- Eric Bertram Rowcroft (1881–1963), British Army major-general and founder of REME, retired to Lyme Regis and died there.
- John Fowles (1926–2005), author of The French Lieutenant's Woman and other novels, lived in Lyme Regis from 1965 until his death and was curator of Lyme Regis Museum from 1978 to 1988.
- Selima Hill (born 1945), award-winning poet
- Ian Gillan (born 1945), lead singer of Deep Purple, lives in Lyme Regis

== See also ==
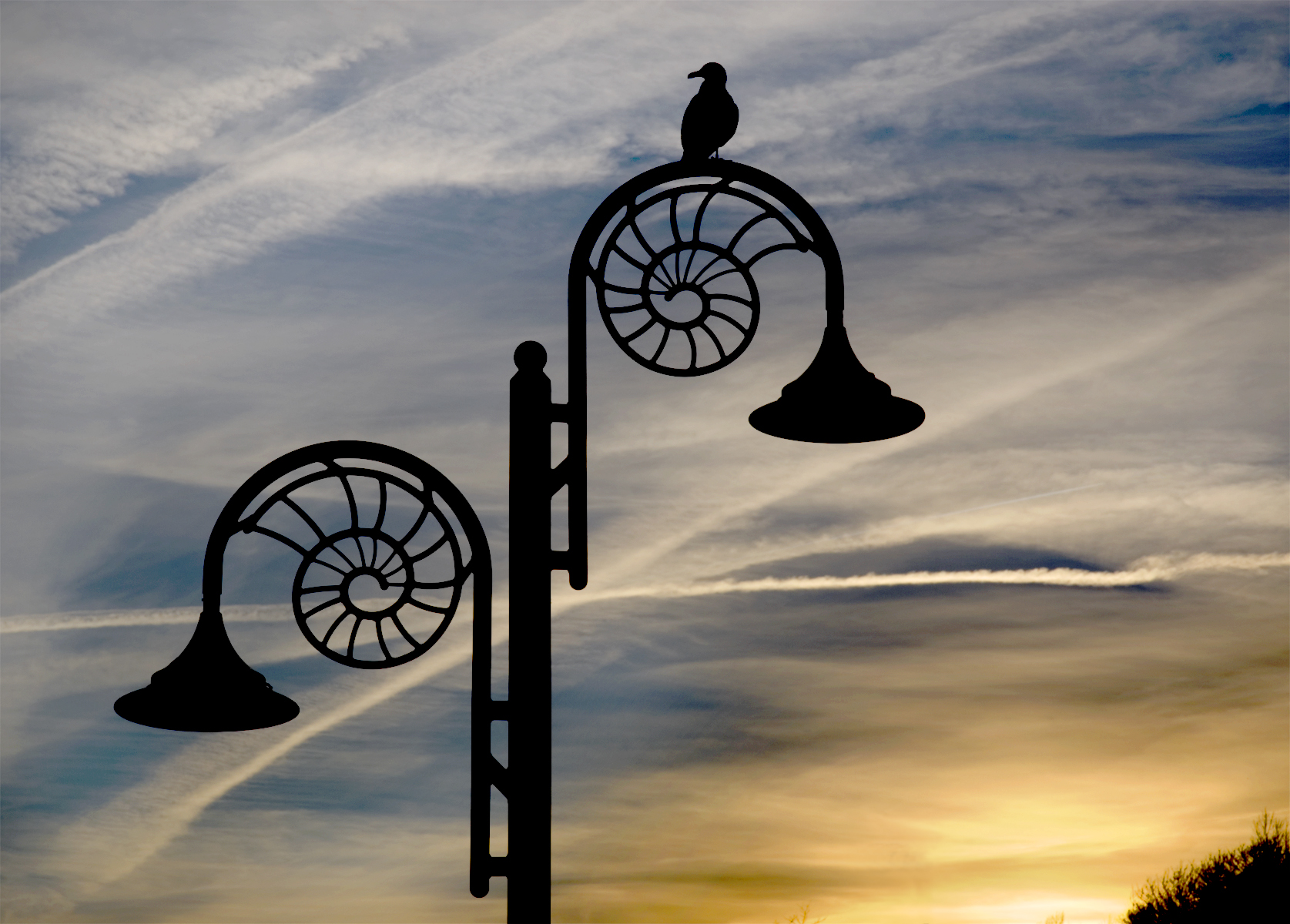
Ammonite-design streetlamps reflect the town's location on the Jurassic Coast

- List of place names with royal patronage in the United Kingdom
- East Devon Way
- List of Dorset Beaches
- List of fossil sites
