= Taunton metro rail =

Coordinates: 51°01′22″N 3°06′13″W

Taunton Metro Rail (Proposed)

Overview
- Locale: Taunton, Somerset
- Stations: 8

Service
- Type: Light rail, Rapid transit
- Services: Wellington – Bridgwater

Technical
- Line length: 30.6 km (19.0 mi)

Taunton Metro Rail (TMR) was a light rail network proposed in 2009 to use a combination of existing rail infrastructure and the construction of new infrastructure in and around Taunton, Somerset.

== Proposal ==
Project Taunton, the authority responsible for Taunton's major regeneration project, revealed plans for TMR in 2009 as part of their transport sustainability plan. A feasibility proposal was to be drawn for Somerset County Council.

It was anticipated that TMR will be modelled against driverless systems such as London's Docklands Light Railway, providing an anticipated peak frequency of five trains per hour and an off-peak frequency of three trains per hour.

If implemented, the avoiding line in Taunton's Station Road would be used as a calling point, rather than integrating it to Taunton's National Rail station. Also, this will mean that Wellington's rail station would be reopened, which had been already proposed by the Conservative Party. The move to re-open Wellington's former rail station gained widespread support from local businesses and residents.

The proposal was due to be submitted in Autumn 2009. However, due to the economic climate and a lack of funding, this has been delayed until further notice.

== History ==
Somerset once had a much more extensive rail network than today. However, many stations and routes were closed following the Reshaping of British Railways report of 1963. A tram system opened in 1901 serving Taunton but closed in 1921 due to a dispute about electricity costs.
