= Chard Central railway station =

Disused railway station in England

Chard Central
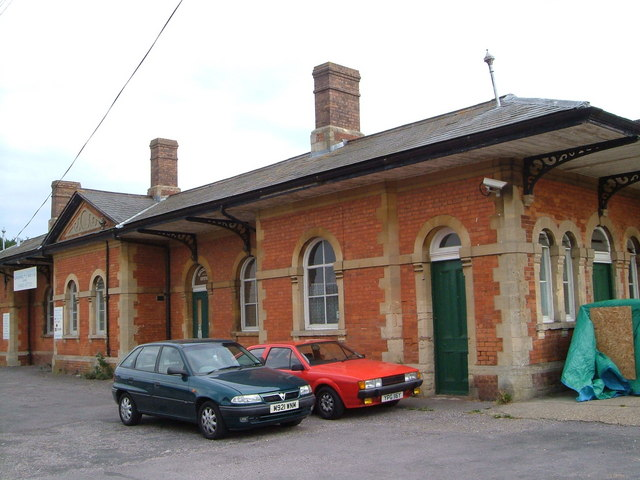
- Chard Central as it is today

General information
- Location: Chard, Somerset; England
- Coordinates: 50.8785°N 2.9545°W
- Platforms: 3

Other information
- Status: Disused

History
- Original company: B&ER and LSWR
- Post-grouping: Great Western Railway

Key dates
- 1866: Chard Joint opened
- 1928: Renamed Chard
- 1949: Renamed Chard Central
- 1962: Closed to passengers
- 1966: Closed entirely
Location

Chard Central railway station was the principal railway station in Chard, Somerset, England. It was opened in 1866 and closed in 1962, during which time it was known by three different names.

== History ==
The first railway to serve Chard was the London and South Western Railway (LSWR) which opened Chard Road on its new Yeovil to Exeter line in 1860. On 8 May 1863 a second station was opened at Chard Town as the terminus of a 3.6-mile (5.8 km) branch from Chard Road.

A second railway was opened on 11 September 1866 by the Bristol and Exeter Railway (B&ER). This line terminated at a new station a short distance north of Chard Town and was served by trains from Taunton. Eleven weeks later, on 26 November, a connecting line was opened between Chard Town and the B&ER station, which was known at this time as 'Chard Joint', and the station was then used as the terminus for both railways. Both railway companies provided staff and there were even separate signal boxes controlling train movements at each end of the station The LSWR was built to 4 ft 8 1/2 in (1,435 mm) standard gauge but the B&ER was a 7 ft (2,134 mm) broad gauge until 19 July 1891.

From 1 January 1917 the Great Western Railway (GWR, which had amalgamated with the B&ER in 1876) took over the operation of trains on the LSWR branch. This allowed some economies to be made, although the trains to Taunton and Chard Junction were still mostly advertised as separate services. In 1923 the LSWR became a part of the larger Southern Railway (SR). The SR platform and sidings were removed by the end of 1927 and the following year their signal box was closed. It was renamed as plain 'Chard' on 1 March 1928, but it appeared as such in GWR timetables before that date.

1948 saw the SR and GWR nationalised as British Railways and from 26 September 1949 it was known as 'Chard Central'. Passenger trains were withdrawn from both branches on 10 September 1962. Public goods traffic continued until 3 February 1964 but goods trains still ran until 3 October 1966 to serve a private siding. After this all track was lifted.

== Description ==
The station was built in stone and brick in one of the styles favoured by Isambard Kingdom Brunel, although he was not the engineer of the line as he died seven years before it was opened. The platform and offices were on the west side of the line, the side closer to the town centre. A train shed spanned the main platform and track. A terminal platform was provided at the north end for trains to Taunton, and at the south end for LSWR services. A goods shed was situated in the yard to the north west of the station and a private siding was provided behind it for B.G. Wyatt on the site of the Chard Canal wharf. A loop at the north end of the station allowed locomotives to run around their trains at the end of their journeys. The GWR signal box was on the east side of the line alongside the loop, and the LSWR one was west of the line at their end of the station.

The station building and train shed still stand and are in use as commercial premises, and is a Grade II listed building.

== Locomotive shed ==
A locomotive shed was provided opposite the north end of the passenger platform when the station opened. Built in brick, it was 70.8 feet (21.6 m) long and 23.5 feet (7.2 m) wide, covering just one track. A wooden platform outside the shed was used to store coal for the locomotives. A 41.25 feet (12.6 m) turntable was provided on its own siding south of the shed. The shed was closed as a depot on 14 July 1924 although the shed line remained in place until 1933 and the turntable until November 1935.

Two GWR locomotives were allocated to Chard in 1901, a 517 Class 0-4-2T and a 1076 Class 0-6-0ST.

== Services ==
From Chard Branch Line

Preceding station	Disused railways	Following station
	1866	
Chard Town	London and South Western Railway; Chard Junction – Chard Joint	Terminus
Terminus	Bristol and Exeter Railway; Chard Joint – Taunton	Ilminster
	1928	
Chard Junction	Great Western Railway; Chard Junction – Chard	Terminus
Terminus	Great Western Railway; Chard – Taunton	Donyatt Halt

== See also ==
- Southern Railway routes west of Salisbury
- Transport in Somerset
