= Chard Junction railway station =

Disused railway station in England

Chard Junction
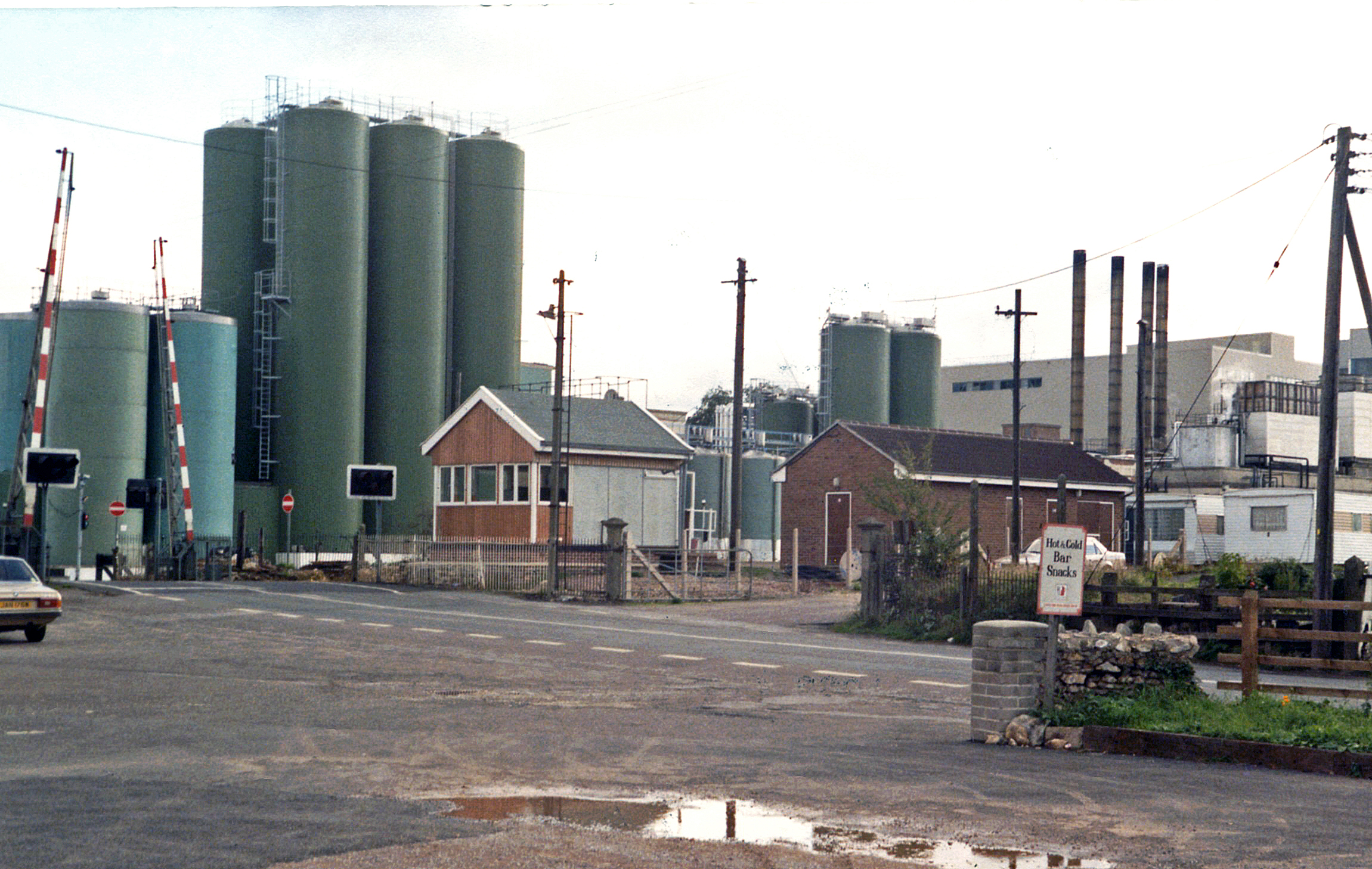
- The site of the station in 1984

General information
- Location: Tatworth, Somerset; England
- Coordinates: 50.8393°N 2.9367°W
- Platforms: 3

Other information
- Status: Disused

History
- Pre-grouping: London and South Western Railway
- Post-grouping: Southern Railway

Key dates
- 1860: Opened as Chard Road
- 1863: Chard branch opened
- 1872: Renamed Chard Junction
- 1962: Chard branch closed
- 1966: Closed to passengers
- 1980: Milk depot closed
- 1982: New signal box built
Location

Chard Junction railway station was situated on the London and South Western Railway’s West of England Main Line about 1 mile (1.6 km) southeast of the village of Tatworth in Somerset, England. It was the junction of a short branch line to Chard. It was opened in 1860 as Chard Road, and closed in 1966. An adjacent milk depot was served by its own sidings from 1937 to 1980. Chard Junction signal box remained open to control Station Road level crossing and a passing loop on the long section of single track railway between Yeovil Junction and Pinhoe until March 2021, when control was passed to Basingstoke.

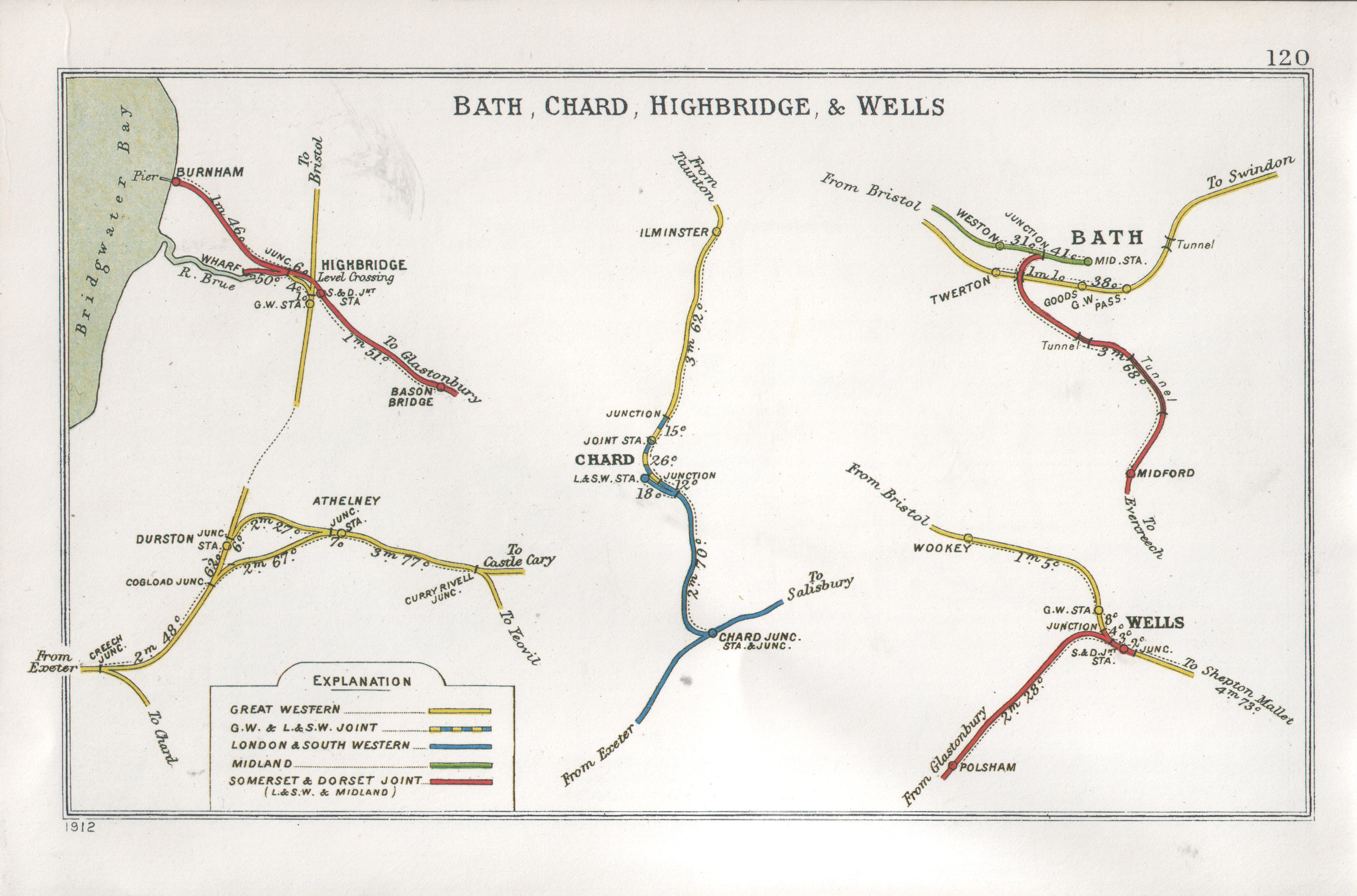
A 1912 Railway Clearing House Junction Diagram showing (centre) railways in the vicinity of Chard Junction (lower centre)

Although no longer a station nor a junction, the name Chard Junction is still in use to refer to the scattered houses and industrial buildings in the vicinity of the station site, on both sides of the border between Somerset and Dorset.

== History ==
The London and South Western Railway's (LSWR) line from Yeovil to Exeter was opened on 19 July 1860; in this area the route generally followed the River Axe, which forms the border between Somerset and Dorset (before 1844, Somerset and Devon). A station named Chard Road was provided to serve the market town of Chard (the 'Road' part of the name indicated that it was not in the town). On 8 May 1863 a 3.6-mile (5.8 km) branch line was opened to Chard Town, but it was not until August 1872 that Chard Road was renamed Chard Junction. A signal box was erected at the junction in 1875.

From 1 January 1917 the branch line was worked by the Great Western Railway (GWR) with the trains and staff that worked its own branch from Taunton to the Chard Joint station that had been opened in 1866. In 1923 the LSWR became a part of the larger Southern Railway (SR).

Sidings for dedicated milk trains to serve a new creamery were laid on the south side of the station in 1937, shunted by the dairy's own Ruston and Hornsby four-wheel diesel locomotive (works number 183062 built 1937). Taken over by the Wiltshire United Co-operative Society, in 1974 a second hand Ruston and Hornsby 0-4-0 replaced it (304470 built 1951), which had previously been locomotive 12 at Windsor Street gas works in Birmingham. The original locomotive was retired into preservation two years later.

1948 saw the SR and GWR nationalised to become the Southern Region and Western Region respectively of British Railways. Things continued much as before but traffic was dwindling. Passenger trains were withdrawn from the Chard branch on 10 September 1962, although goods traffic continued for a few years more. From 1963 the line west of Salisbury was transferred to the Western Region and just a few months later The Reshaping of British Railways report recommended the closure of many rural stations and lines. In 1964 through trains beyond Exeter were mostly rerouted off the line through Chard Junction and along the Bristol to Exeter line instead. Just two years later, on 7 March 1966, Chard Junction was closed to passengers and on 3 October that year the remaining goods traffic on the branch line was withdrawn and the line closed completely. Further rationalisation saw the main line reduced to just a single track in 1967, although a passing loop was retained at Chard Junction. The 21.4 miles (34.4 km) eastwards to Sherborne was singled on 7 May, followed by the 15.3 miles (24.6 km) westwards to Honiton on 11 June. The old level crossing gates were removed in January 1968 and replaced by full road-width lifting barriers.

The sidings serving the milk factory were taken out of use in 1980, although two years later a new signal box was built to replace the original that was then more than 100 years old. Additional loops have been installed since the 1960s; since December 2009 the single-line sections are 17.4 miles (28.0 km) eastwards to Yeovil Junction and 3.7 miles (6.0 km) westwards to the long loop at Axminster.

== Description ==
The railway here climbs eastwards at a gradient of 1 in 120 (0.8%). At the north-east end of the station was the level crossing of Station Road and the Chard Road Hotel that served railway passengers at this remote location. The main station buildings were on the north-west side, the side nearer to Chard and on the platform for trains going towards Yeovil and London. On the opposite platform there was only a small waiting room and basic facilities. In front of the station entrance was the road approach and, opposite this, a separate platform used by the Chard branch trains. The track layout did not allow trains to run directly between the branch and main line, instead traffic to and from the branch had to be shunted through a connection in the goods yard which was at the Exeter end of the station between the main and branch lines. This included a goods shed and facilities for handling cattle traffic. The private sidings for the milk depot were behind the Exeter-bound platform.

Today the old London- and Chard-bound platforms can still be seen, along with the signal box next to the level crossing. The goods shed still stands and is in use, but not for railway business. The station hotel still stands to the north east of the level crossing; it was known as now the Three Counties Hotel it has since closed.

== Signalling ==
The first signal box was provided on the eastbound platform next to the level crossing in 1875. The next signal box to the west was 2 miles (3.2 km) away at Broom Gates (a level crossing), and one was opened at Hewish Gates in 1900, shortening the section towards Crewkerne in the east by 5 miles (8.0 km). A separate signal box known as Chard Junction Branch controlled movements in and out of the branch platform. It was reduced in status to a ground frame on 5 March 1935 and was closed entirely in 1964. The signal box on the main line platforms was replaced in 1982 but it continues to be known as 'Chard Junction', despite the lack of any kind of junction since 1966. As part of signalling modernisation the signal box closed and controlled remotely from Basingstoke (info sourced 2012).

== Services ==
Long-distance services on the main line were operated by the LSWR and its successors between London Waterloo station and various stations in Devon and Cornwall such as Plymouth Friary, Ilfracombe and Padstow. Local trains often operated between Salisbury or Yeovil Town and Exeter Queen Street.

Branch line services were operated between Chard Junction and Chard Town from 1863 to 1866, and between Chard Junction and Chard Joint (or Central as it was later known) from 1866 to 1962. These were operated by the LSWR until 1916 and then by the GWR, although only very seldom were they advertised as running through to Taunton on the latter's branch.

Preceding station	Historical railways	Following station
Crewkerne; Line and station open	Southern Region of British Railways; West of England Main Line	Axminster; Line and station open
	Disused railways	
Terminus	London and South Western Railway; Chard Branch Line (1863 to 1916)	Chard Town; Line and station closed
Terminus	Western Region of British Railways; Chard Branch Line (1917 to 1962)	Chard Central; Line and station closed

== Proposed reopening ==
There are proposals to re-open Chard Junction as part of a Chard town regeneration scheme; this has the support of Mayor Martin Wale, and both the current MP for Yeovil Marcus Fysh, and the former MP David Laws.

Whilst the station has been unused since 1966, the site has been subject to protection in planning terms from redevelopment that would preclude the station being reopened for passenger and as a possible freight terminal. In 2010 the site was sold by the former British Railways Board and offered to Somerset County Council who declined to buy it as they thought it would cost too much money to re-open it. Based solely upon this statement the local planning authority, South Somerset District Council, are currently stating that they will no longer protect the site in planning terms from redevelopment. In January 2012 a planning application for a concrete batching facility was lodged by Darch and Sons, currently this application is being deliberated by South Somerset District Council and as a result a campaign group has been set up to try and protect the station site from development and to get the planning protection reinstated. Supporters of the campaign include David Laws MP, county and district councillors and the local newspaper the Chard and Ilminster News. The support group has accused the local planning authority and county council of "following in the footsteps of Beeching".

Following the government's support for expanding the railway network it has been proposed that Chard Junction could reopen.

In January 2018, Devon County Council agreed to re-examine the proposals to reopen the station.

In May 2018, a transport strategy recommended the reopening of the station to passengers.

In June 2022, local councilor Connor Payne launched a new campaign to re-open the station, proposing the site re-open as 'Chard Parkway' and serve a similar purpose to stations such as Bristol Parkway and Tiverton Parkway.

In July 2022, Somerset Council announced it had "no firm plans" to re-open the station. The Council stated it would cost £60,000 just to investigate a possible reopening. Tatworth & Forton Parish Council voted against supporting the campaign.

In July 2023, Councilor Payne announced that local businesses were ready to fund the £23,000 needed to develop a business case for the proposed station. In August, Network Rail agreed to assess the feasibility of trains stopping at the new station, undertaking a timetable study.

In September 2023, Thorncombe Parish Council and Upper Marshwood Parish Council announced their support for the campaign.

== Gallery ==
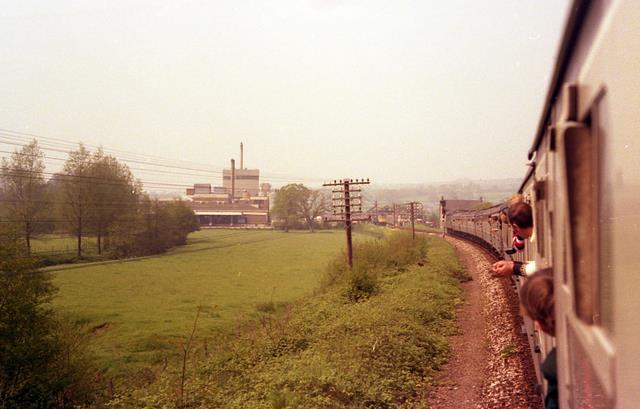
A view of Chard Junction from the Tobay Express, rail tour in 1978.

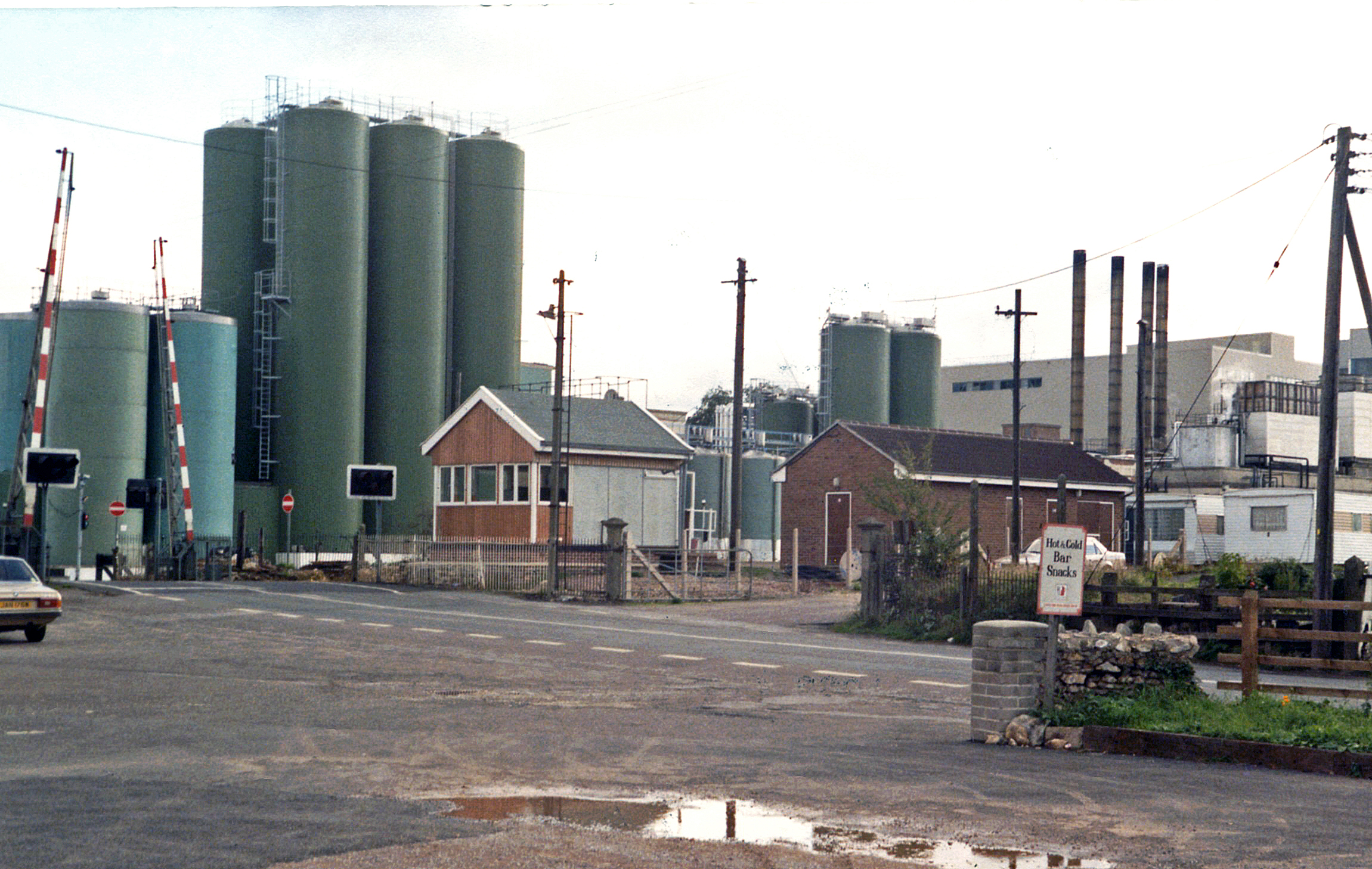
Chard Junction station in 1984.

== See also ==
- Southern Railway routes west of Salisbury
- Transport in Somerset
