= Somerset Airport =

Somerset Airport may refer to:

- Somerset Airport (New Jersey) in Somerset County, New Jersey, United States (FAA: SMQ)
- Somerset Aerodrome in Somerset, Manitoba, Canada (TC: CKC8)
- Somerset County Airport in Somerset County, Pennsylvania, United States (FAA: 2G9)

== See also ==
- Transport in Somerset
