= Gravesend, Rosherville and Northfleet Tramways =

Tramway operator in England

Operation
- Locale: Gravesend, Kent, Northfleet
- Open: 15 June 1883
- Close: 30 June 1901
- Status: Closed

Infrastructure
- Track gauge: 3 ft 6 in (1,067 mm)
- Propulsion system: Horse

Gravesend, Rosherville and Northfleet Tramways operated a tramway service between Gravesend, Kent and Northfleet between 1883 and 1901.

== History ==
Services started on 15 June 1883 on a horse-drawn tramway from Leather Bottle, Northfleet to Wellington Street, Gravesend running at half-hour intervals.

== Closure ==
In 1901 the company was taken over by the Gravesend and Northfleet Electric Tramways, a subsidiary of British Electric Traction.
