= Gravesend and Northfleet Electric Tramways =

Tramway service

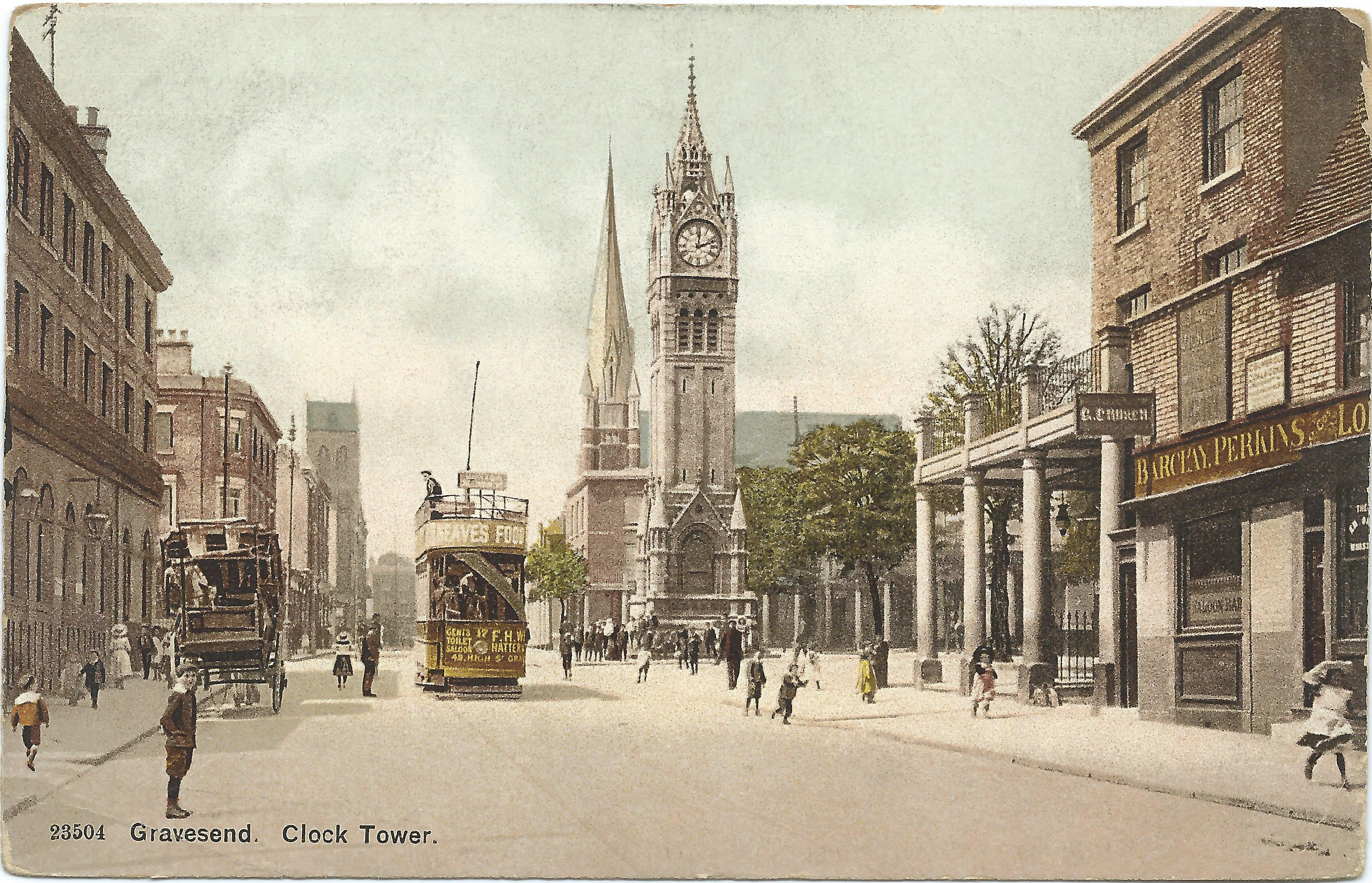
- A tram at Gravesend Clock Tower before August 1907

Operation
- Locale: Gravesend, Kent, Northfleet
- Open: 2 August 1902
- Close: 29 February 1929
- Status: Closed

Infrastructure
- Track gauge: 1,435 mm (4 ft 8 1/2 in)
- Propulsion system: Electric

Statistics
- Route length: 6.47 miles (10.41 km)

Gravesend and Northfleet Electric Tramways operated a tramway service between Gravesend, Kent and Northfleet between 1902 and 1929.

== History ==
In 1901 the Gravesend, Rosherville and Northfleet Tramways were taken over by the Gravesend and Northfleet Electric Tramways, a subsidiary of British Electric Traction. The tramway was converted from 3 ft 6in gauge to standard gauge and electrified.

Services started on 2 August 1902 with a route from Galley Hill, Swanscombe to Denton. In 1903 New tram routes opened from Pelham Road to Perry Street, Windmill Street to Old Road and a connection to the Leather Bottle, Northfleet.

The depot was located off Dover Road East at TQ 6351 7358.

In 1921 it obtained two second hand cars from the Taunton Tramway.

== Closure ==
The tramway service closed on 29 February 1929.
