= Transport in Somerset =

Somerset in England

Unitary authorities of Somerset: 1. Somerset; 2. Bath and North East Somerset; 3. North Somerset

The earliest known infrastructure for transport in Somerset is a series of wooden trackways laid across the Somerset Levels, an area of low-lying marshy ground. To the west of this district lies the Bristol Channel, while the other boundaries of the county of Somerset are along chains of hills that were once exploited for their mineral deposits. These natural features have all influenced the evolution of the transport network. Roads and railways either followed the hills, or needed causeways to cross the Levels. Harbours were developed, rivers improved, and linked to sources of traffic by canals. Railways were constructed throughout the area, influenced by the needs of the city of Bristol, which lies just to the north of Somerset, and to link the ports of the far south-west with the rest of England.

Today, the trunk road and rail routes to the south-western counties of Devon and Cornwall pass through Somerset. This gives the county good connections to Wales, London, and the north of England. A major port and an international airport are situated in the north of the county. Older infrastructure, such as canals and defunct railway lines, have been adapted to serve present day demands for leisure use.

== History ==
=== Early developments ===
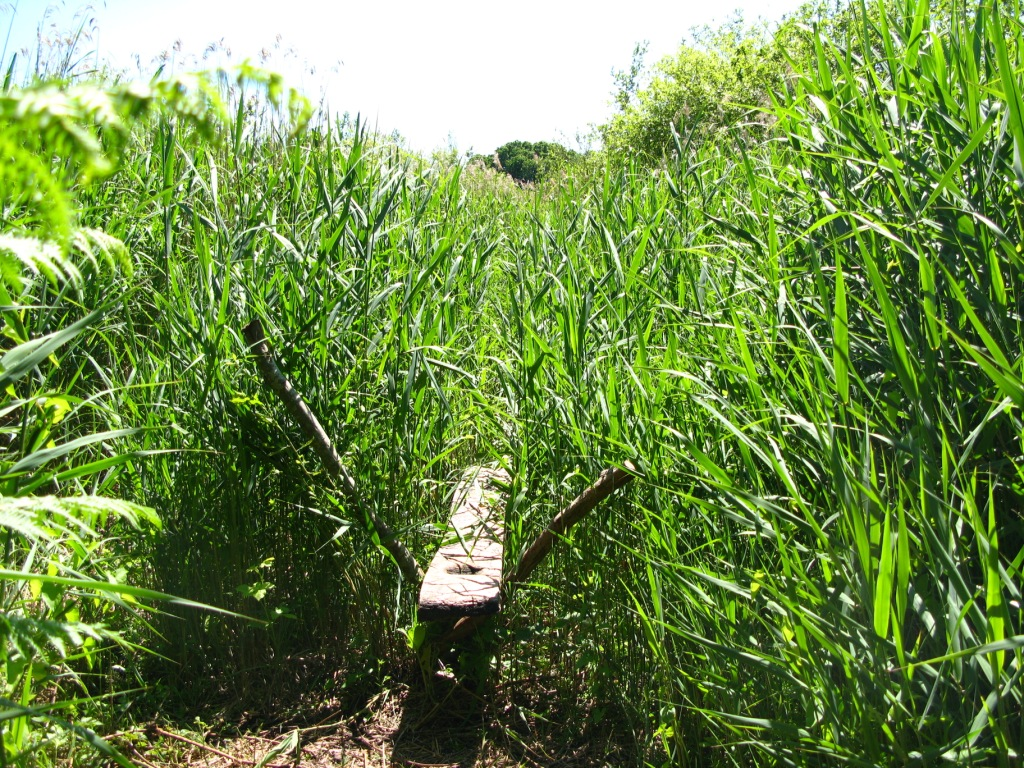
A replica of the Sweet Track

The oldest timber trackway known in Northern Europe, and perhaps the oldest road in the world, is the 2 kilometres (1.2 mi) Sweet Track across part of the Somerset Levels, the low-lying land in the centre of the county. Analysis of the timbers has enabled very precise dating, showing it was built in the spring of 3806 BCE. It extended across the marsh from what was then an island at Westhay, to the Polden Hills at Shapwick. Named after Ray Sweet, who discovered it while cleaning ditches, it is just one of a network of at least 43 tracks that once crossed the Levels.

Pack horse tracks and trails developed later on the higher, drier ground. These could be negotiated by people on foot, or horse and donkeys carrying larger loads. Many of these ancient routes are still in existence across farm land as bridleways and public footpaths, such as that at Midford which links the Pack Horse bridge to the villages of Combe Hay and Twinhoe. Other examples can be seen on older Ordnance Survey maps prepared during the 18th and 19th centuries.

Early trackways were limited in use by the conditions of the underlying soil. The temperate Climate of south-west England can be very erosive to any manmade structures. During winter in particular, whilst a horse and rider could cover a significant distance in a day, any attempt to convey heavy goods such as building materials could be extremely difficult and time-consuming.

=== Roman era ===
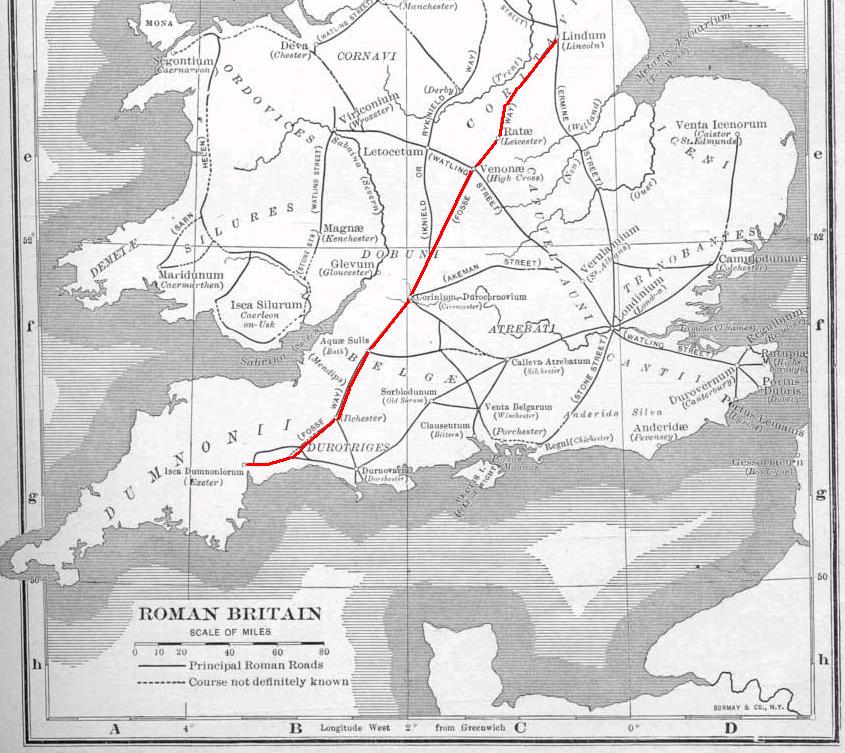
Roman roads showing the Fosse Way

After the Roman conquest of Britain in 43 CE they built a number of forts to impose their authority. They included one built inside the earlier Iron Age hill fort at Ham Hill, one at Charterhouse on the Mendip Hills, and probably another at Ilchester where a settlement developed around an important crossroads and river crossing. While earlier trackways continued to be used, a number of relatively straight, well drained Roman roads were built to facilitate communications between the forts and allow the rapid movement of troops.

One of the most important roads in the Roman's British network was the Fosse Way from Lincoln to Exeter which ran south-westwards across Somerset. From Bath the route is now used by parts of the A367 road through Radstock and Stratton-on-the-Fosse. It then crosses open country along farm tracks and minor roads, passing through the eastern suburbs of Shepton Mallet to Cannard's Grave. The route then becomes the A37 through Street-on-the-Fosse and Lydford-on-Fosse almost as far as Ilchester. After passing through the town the route then follows a section of the A303 under the ramparts of the fort at Ham Hill.

The Dorchester Road ran south-eastwards from Ilchester, following the line of the present-day A37 through Yeovil. Another road ran westwards along the Polden Hills to Crandon Bridge near the mouth of the River Parrett, a district important at the time for its salt production. The Fosse Way was crossed at Beacon Hill north of Shepton Mallet by a road that linked lead and silver mines at Charterhouse with a harbour at Southampton. Hot springs were discovered near where the Fosse Way crossed the River Avon and the town of Aquae Sulis (now the city of Bath) developed there. Just a little further north the Fosse Way crossed a long road between London and Sea Mills.

The waters of the Bristol Channel and rivers such as the Avon were used for transport. The small vessels in use at that time could navigate quite some distance upstream, indeed the River Yeo shows evidence of being straightened near Ilchester. Harbours were established near river mouths at Sea Mills (River Avon), Uphill (River Axe), Crandon Bridge and possibly Combwich (River Parrett).

=== After the Romans ===
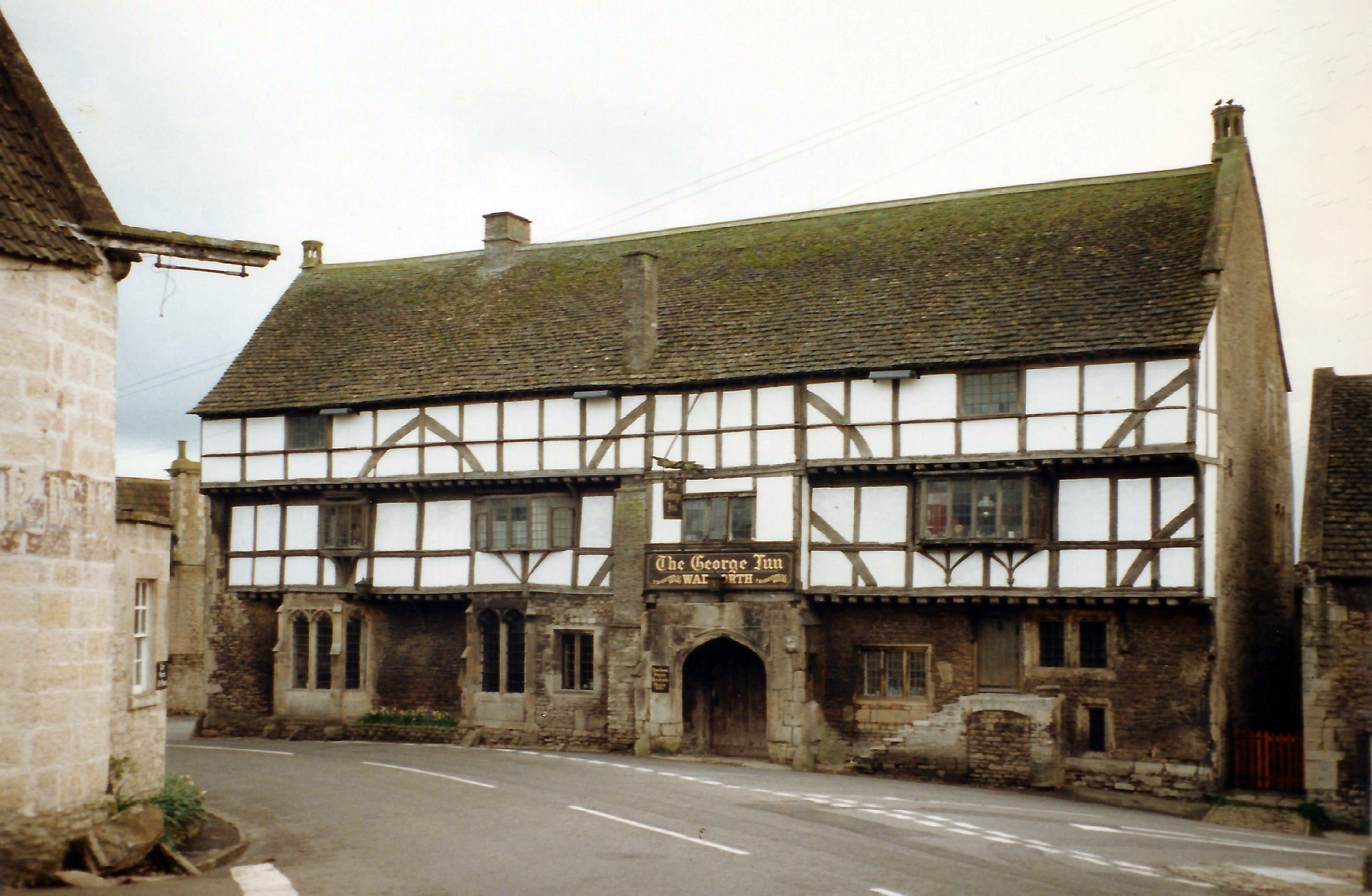
The George Inn, Norton St Philip, once a coaching inn

The Romans left the area to its own devices after 410 CE, although most of the established settlements and infrastructure continued in use for many years. Over time new settlements were established, often related to crossing points on rivers such as Highbridge, Bridgwater and Taunton. When Daniel Defoe surveyed the county in 1724 he reported that there were two routes between Taunton and Bristol. The 'Lower Way' which was often impassable due to flooding, and the busier 'Higher Way' over the Mendip Hills. A causeway was created across the flood plains at Mark on the route between Highbridge and Wells.

Unlike today's mechanical transport, the long journeys at this time used animal power and were undertaken in small stages, fresh horses were required at intervals, hence the name 'stage' coaches. Coaching inns provided travellers with refreshments and overnight accommodation required. The George Inn, at Norton St Philip, is one of a number of establishments that claims to be Britain's oldest tavern, is located in the centre of the village. It was built in the 14th or 15th century, as a wool store for the priory at Hinton Charterhouse and to accommodate travellers and merchants coming to the annual wool fairs that were held in the village from the late 13th century until 1902. In the 15th century the timber-framed upper floors were added. The inn became part of the stage coach route between London and the South West. On 12 June 1668 the noted diarist Samuel Pepys, with his wife and servants, passed through the village on their way to Bath from Salisbury.

From the eighteenth century a number of turnpike trusts were set up to build and maintain roads. For instance, the Taunton Turnpike Trust was established in 1752 to improve the roads around that town. The network of turnpikes speeded traffic. Before the end of the century the time taken by the mail coach from Taunton to London had been halved from four to just two days; by 1823 the journey took just 23 hours. The turnpikes were funded by tolls charged on users. Some individuals also had powers to charge road users, often where bridges replaced ferries across rivers. An example of a toll road which has survived into the twenty-first century is between the villages of Bathampton and Batheaston across the river Avon. This was built to replace a man-powered cable supported punt ferry in 1870.

The early roads were improved by the use of tarmacadam construction in the early 20th century. A feature of the M5 motorway south of Taunton, built in the 1970s, is the use of concrete "rafts" to overcome the water-logged soil in that area.

== Waterways ==
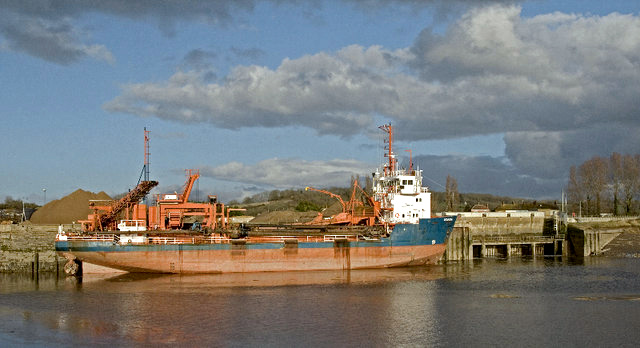
Dunball Wharf. To the right is Dunball Clyce where the King's Sedgemoor Drain flows into the River Parrett.

The waters of the Bristol Channel are a natural highway and several of the county's rivers used to be navigable to small vessels. A small harbour was established in Roman times at Uphill at the mouth of the River Axe. The river was navigable to the settlement at Weare and overseas trade was carried out from the wharf at Rackley during the Middle Ages, although this village is no longer on the river as the course has been diverted. By 1388 Thomas Tanner of Wells was exporting cloth and corn from Rackley to Portugal, and receiving iron and salt in exchange. Slate was imported through this route at a later date, but an Act of Parliament in 1915 authorised the drainage of the Axe and installation of a flood gate at Bleadon, which is now the tidal limit on the river. Lympsham Wharf near Bleadon had also been used for many years but the arrival of the railway in 1841 made this the furthest navigable point. It was last used by the ketch Democrat in 1942. In 1915 an Act of Parliament authorised the drainage of the Axe and installation of a flood gate at Bleadon, which is now the tidal limit on the river.

In the medieval period the River Parrett was used to transport Hamstone from the quarry at Ham Hill for the construction of churches throughout the county. The nearest bridge to the river's mouth was established at Bridgwater in 1200 AD. A ford, usable only at low tide, and later a ferry operated across the mouth of the river at Combwich, it is thought, since Roman times. The crossing lay on the route of a Saxon herepath; and in the 15th century was regarded as part of the King's Highway. The White House Inn, a licensed victualler, on the Pawlett bank traded from 1655 to 1897 but the ferry has since fallen out of use, and the former White House Inn was demolished round about 1930.

The River Parrett was originally part of the Port of Bristol, however in 1348 a Port of Bridgwater was created. This encompassed 80 miles (130 km) of the Somerset coast line, from the Devon border to the mouth of the River Axe. Some quays were built in Bridgwater in 1424 and another quay, the Langport Slip, was built in 1488 upstream of the town bridge. The river was navigable, with care, as far as the town bridge by 400–500 tonne vessels. Goods arriving by sea were trans-shipped into barges that could navigate the River Parrett to Langport and, by using the River Yeo, to Ilchester. Barges could also reach Taunton by using the Bridgwater and Taunton Canal after it opened in 1827.

Combwich Pill, a small creek near the mouth of the river, has been used for shipping since the 14th century; and the wharf in the 18th century was used for the unloading of coal and tiles. From the 1830s, with the development of the brick and tile industry in the Bridgwater area, it was used by two brickyards to import coal and to export tiles to other harbours on the Bristol Channel. This traffic ceased in the 1930s but in 1950 the wharf was taken over by the Central Electricity Generating Board to bring in materials for the construction of Hinkley Point nuclear power station.

Following the passing of the Port of Bridgwater Act in 1845 all river traffic between the mouth of the River Parrett and the first bridge fell under the jurisdiction of the Port of Bridgwater. In 1998 Sedgemoor District Council took over the pilotage services for the river which had previously been operated by Trinity House.

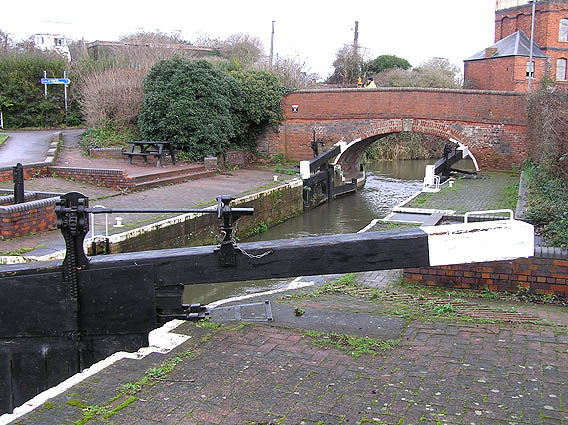
Firepool Lock where the Bridgwater and Taunton Canal joins the River Tone

On the northern edges of the county, the River Avon provided a route from the Bristol Channel through Bristol to Bath. An Act was passed in 1712 to 'clearing, making and effecting a passage for boats, lighters and other vessels', although work did not start until 1724. At Bath the river linked with the Kennet and Avon Canal. This was completed in 1810 and, enabling narrow boats to work through to London.

The Somerset Coal Canal was surveyed under the supervision of John Rennie, in June 1795 a tender from Houghton and Son was accepted and the first work started at Gooseyard bridge near Paulton. In 1798 the first delivery of coal from Dunkerton to Bath took place. It was built in the early 19th century to reduce the cost of transportation of coal and other heavy produce. It was one of the few canals in England to become economically viable, and was eventually sold to the Great Western Railway Company in 1904. The first 16 kilometres (10 mi), from a junction with the Kennet and Avon Canal at Dundas Aqueduct to Paulton, was in use by 1805 together with several tramways. A feature of the canal was the variety of methods used at Combe Hay to overcome height differences between the upper and lower reaches of the canal. This was initially done by the use of Caisson locks. These failed and were replaced by an inclined plane and then by a flight of 22 locks. A branch to Radstock was started but instead a tramway was laid along its towing path. In 1871 the tramway was purchased by the Somerset and Dorset Joint Railway (S&DJR), and operated until the 1950s.

A Dorset and Somerset Canal was proposed in 1792, but the little of it that was constructed was closed in 1803. Further canals were constructed in Somerset during the nineteenth century, including the Bridgwater and Taunton Canal (1827), Glastonbury Canal (1834), Grand Western Canal (1839), Westport Canal (1840) and Chard Canal (1842).

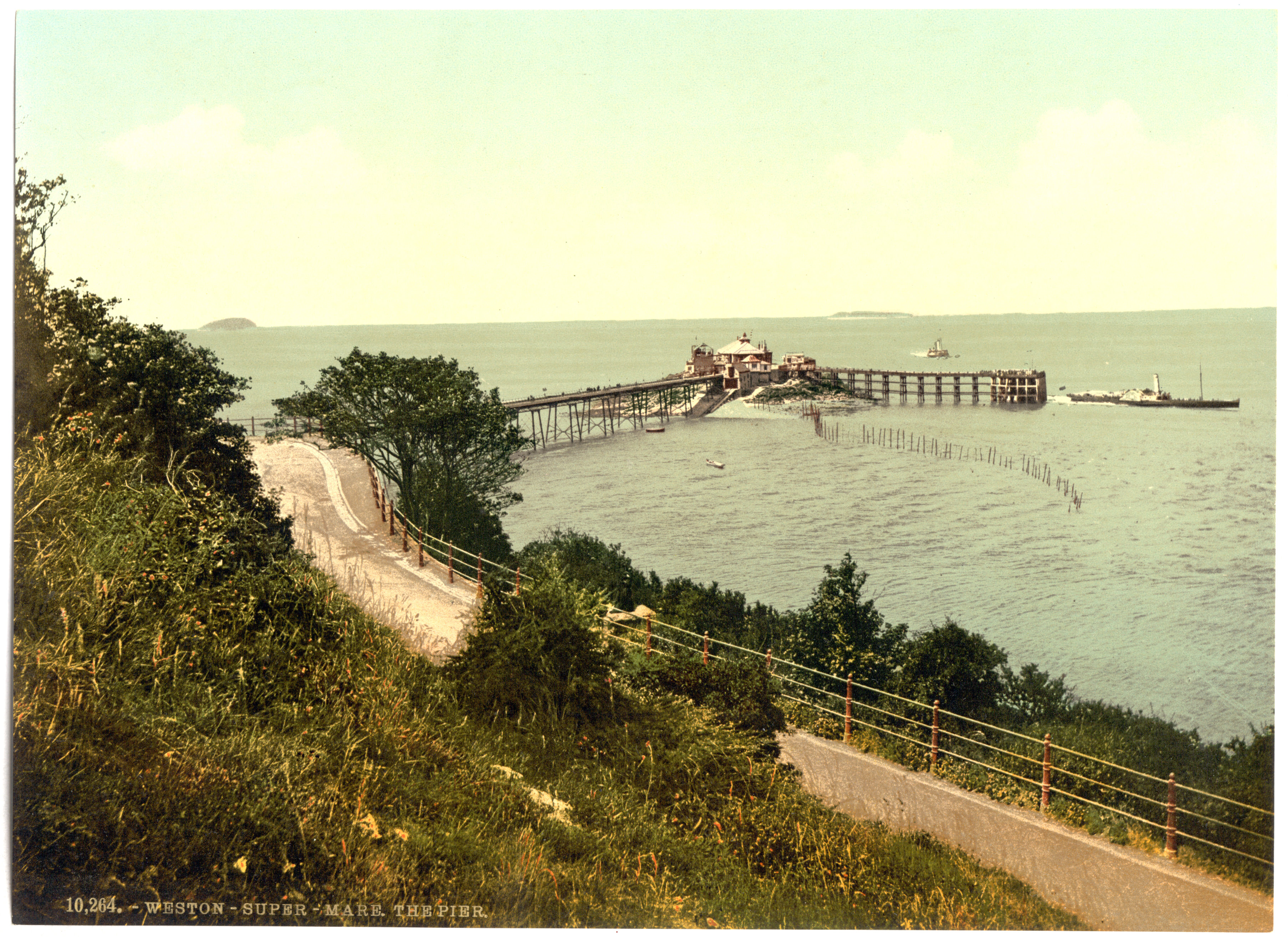
Pleasure steamers at Birnbeck Pier, Weston-super-Mare

Steam ships were operating in the Bristol Channel and calling at Portishead in the 1820s. Pleasure trips for passengers were being operated from the harbours at Minehead, Watchet and Weston-super-Mare in the 1850s. The construction of piers at Weston-super-Mare (in 1867) and Clevedon (1869) offered further landing places for a number of steamer operators for more than a century. The last commercial pleasure steamers were operated by P and A Campbell in 1979, although two preserved ships still make regular appearances.

The arrival of railways on the Somerset coast brought new traffic to its harbours. A siding from the Bristol and Exeter Railway to Dunball Wharf opened in 1844, and a branch was opened to the docks at Bridgwater the following year. The West Somerset Mineral Railway opened in 1857 to carry iron ore from the Brendon Hills to the harbour at Watchet, and the West Somerset Railway connected it with the main railway network in 1862. In 1858 the Somerset Central Railway opened as part of a project to link Wales with France by way of a jetty near Burnham-on-Sea railway station. The railway also used a wharf near Highbridge railway station. A jetty was opened on the River Yeo at Wick St. Lawrence in about 1915, which was served by the Weston, Clevedon and Portishead Light Railway. The Royal Portbury Dock was opened near Portishead in 1977 to provide extra capacity for the Port of Bristol, which lead to the reopening of part of the Portishead branch line for freight traffic on 7 January 2002.

== Railways ==
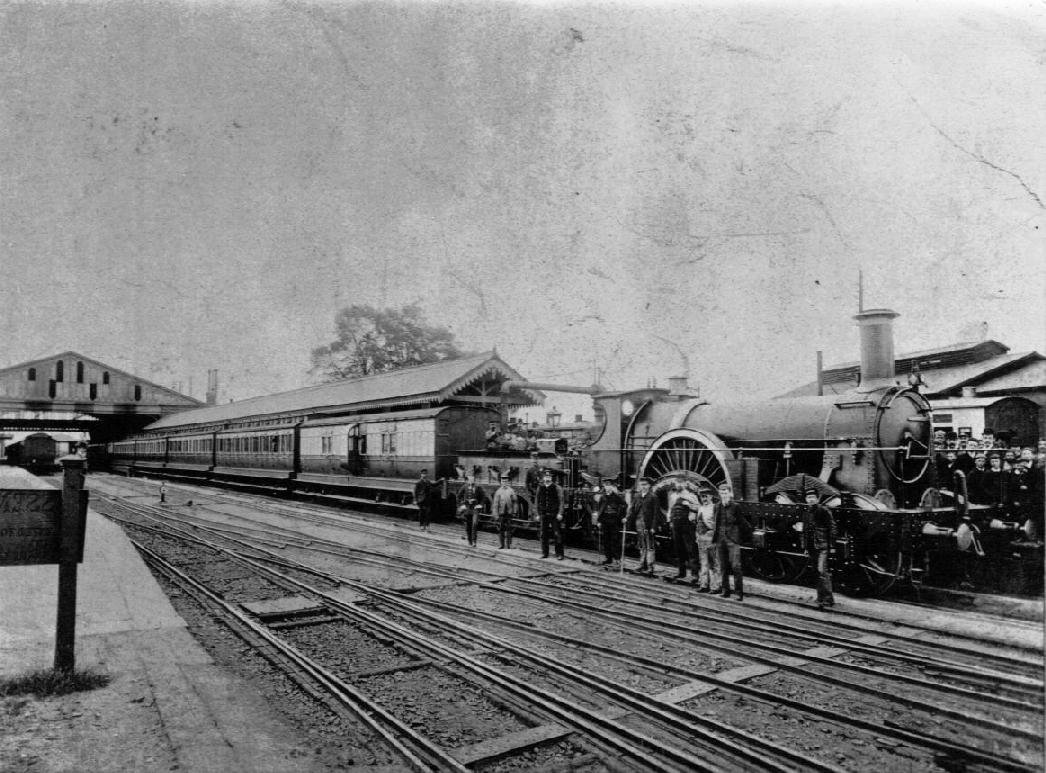
Taunton railway station in 1892

The period of canals as an important transport network was short-lived. Before the Chard Canal had been completed the Great Western Railway (GWR) had opened a route following the River Avon from Bristol Temple Meads to Bath Spa. This was on 31 August 1840, and the railway was completed through to London Paddington ten months later. Shortly before this the Bristol & Exeter Railway (B&ER) had opened to Weston-super-Mare and Bridgwater. Both these companies engaged Isambard Kingdom Brunel as engineer and used his 7 ft 1/4 in (2,140 mm) broad gauge. The B&ER was extended to Taunton in 1842 and Wellington in 1843 and a branch line was added to Clevedon in 1847.

Another GWR line that would eventually link Chippenham and Weymouth reached Frome in 1850 and started to carry coal from the collieries at Radstock in 1854. Its main line was finally extended from Frome to Yeovil in 1856 and a branch opened from Witham to Shepton Mallet and Wells in 1858/1862. The B&ER had opened its own Yeovil Branch Line from the Taunton direction in 1853. Another company, the Somerset Central Railway, built lines across the Somerset Levels from Highbridge & Burnham to Glastonbury in 1854 and Burnham-on-Sea in 1858. A branch line to Wells Priory Road was added the following year.

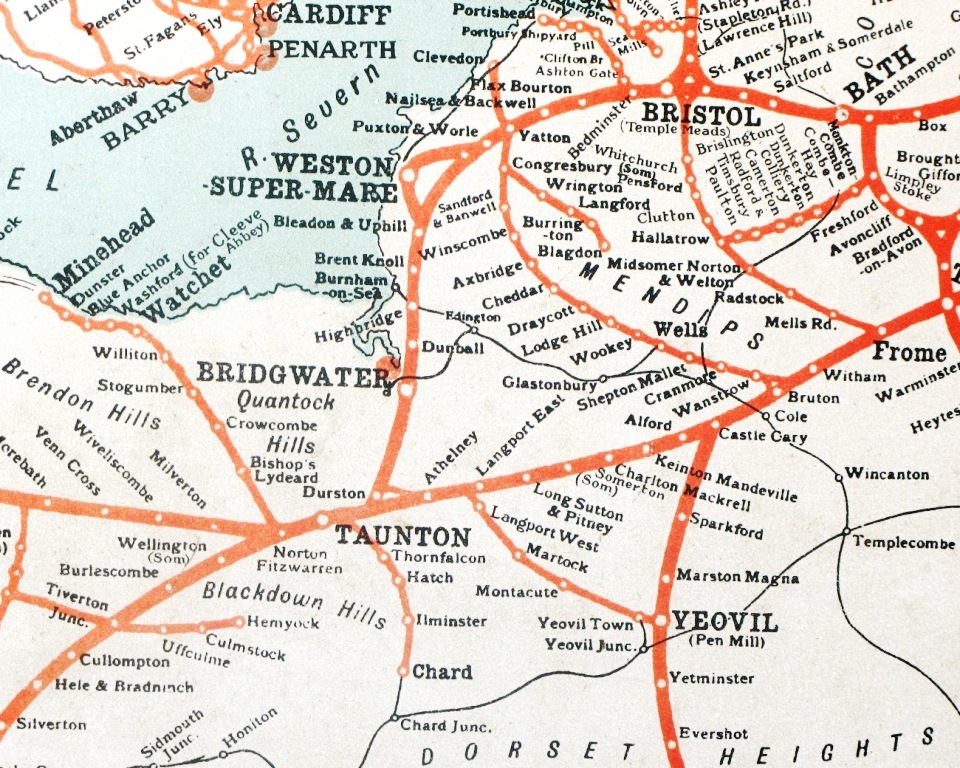
Railways in Somerset c1930

In the meantime the London & South Western Railway (LSWR) had been promoting railways from London Waterloo through the south of the county, reaching Templecombe, Yeovil and Crewkerne in 1860, and Chard in 1863. The Midland Railway opened a line from Bristol to Bath Green Park railway station in 1869. These two companies acquired a shared interest in the Somerset & Dorset Joint Railway (S&DJR), as the Somerset Central Railway had become. Templecombe became an important railway junction between the LSWR and S&DJR, especially after 1874 when a new S&DJR main line was opened across the Mendips from Evercreech Junction to Bath, creating a link from the south coast to the Midland Railway.

Meanwhile, the B&ER opened lines to Watchet in 1862 (extended to Minehead in 1874), Chard in 1866, Portishead in 1867, Cheddar and Wells in 1869/1870, and Wivelsicombe in 1873. The B&ER and GWR had by now made a start on converting their lines to carry both broad and standard gauge trains. The GWR opened a Bristol and North Somerset Railway to Radstock in 1873 as a purely standard gauge line but full conversion of all lines to standard gauge was not completed until 1892, 16 years after the B&ER had been absorbed into the GWR.

The Light Railways Act 1896 made it easier to build railways cheaply. The Weston, Clevedon and Portishead Light Railway (WCPLR) opened between Weston-super-Mare and Clevedon in 1897 and between Clevedon and Portishead in 1907, where there was a connection with the GWR. This connected three coastal towns, which were all on the end of GWR branch lines. The GWR also made use of the Light Railways Act to open a Wrington Vale Light Railway in 1901, however it also built the Langport and Castle Cary Railway which linked the line through Frome with the old B&ER route at Taunton and thus allowed the GWR to offer a shorter route from London to Taunton and the South West from 1906.

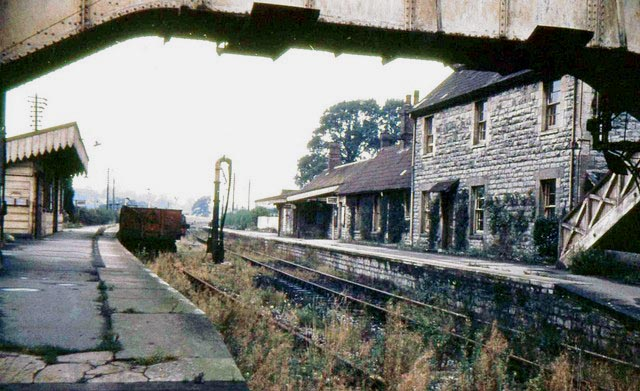
Evercreech Junction after closure

By now motor bus services were starting to appear. At first they were often operated by the railway companies as a way of offering services to new destinations, but after World War I the tramway companies and private individuals gradually offered more and more routes. The first significant railway closures were the Wrington Vale Light Railway in 1931, and the Weston, Clevedon and Portishead Light Railway in 1941. On 1 January 1948 the railways that were still operating were nationalised to become British Railways. This didn't stop the closures: the Burnham-on-Sea branch closed in 1951, the line from Bristol to Radstock and Frome in 1959, Taunton to Chard in 1962, and Yatton to Cheddar and Witham in 1963. Despite this rationalisation British Railways was losing £140m a year in the 1960s. The Reshaping of British Railways report was announced on 27 March 1963, proposing massive cuts to lines and services. Thousands of people, many in remote rural areas, were shocked at losing their local services and mounted opposition to the closures. This had little effect as the Taunton to Yeovil branch and the Portishead branch in 1964. 1966 saw most of the remaining cross-country routes closed: Bristol to Bath Green Park; Bath Green Park to Templecombe, Highbridge to Evercreech, Yatton to Clevedon, and Taunton to Wiveliscombe. The Taunton to Minehead line was kept open until January 1971 but was reopened as a heritage railway by the West Somerset Railway in 1976, although trains now start from Bishops Lydeard rather than Taunton. A short section of the East Somerset Railway was similarly reopened in 1980.

=== Proposed reopening ===
It is hoped to reopen the Portishead Railway connecting Bristol Temple Meads to Portishead. The 2006-2011 Joint Local Transport Plan reserves £1 million for the project. In January 2009, it was announced that Network Rail is to carry out a feasibility study on re-opening the line. Track clearance works began in 2013 and the location for the new station has been decided. In February 2025, it was announced that the final funds to complete the project had been secured, with work due to start in Summer 2025.

== Trams ==
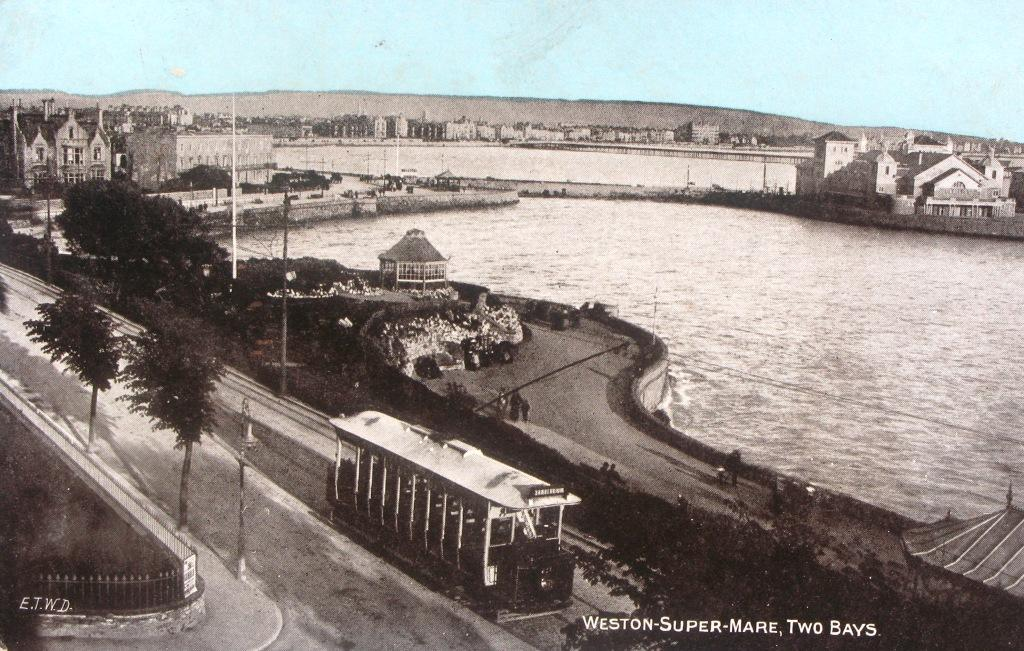
A "toast rack" tram in Weston-super-Mare

On-street tramways once operated in three Somerset towns. The first to open was in Bath on 24 December 1880. The 4 ft (1,219 mm) gauge cars were horse-drawn along a route from London Road to the Great Western Railway station, but the system closed in 1902. These were replaced by electric tram cars on a greatly expanded 4 ft 8 1/2 in (1,435 mm) gauge system that opened in 1904. This eventually extended to some 18 miles (29 km) with routes to Combe Down, Oldfield Park, Twerton, Newton St Loe, Weston and Bathford.

The Taunton Tramway was opened on 21 August 1901. Six double deck cars operated on the 3 ft 6 in (1,067 mm) gauge line between Taunton railway station and East Reach where the depot was situated. The service was withdrawn for two months in 1905 while the track was improved; the original six double-deck cars were replaced at the same time by six single deck cars. A short extension beyond the station to Rowbarton was opened in 1909 making the line 1.66 miles (2.7 km) long. In 1921 the tram company was in dispute with the council over the cost of electricity. The National bus company offered to operate bus services in the town and so the power was cut off and the tram service ceased on 28 May 1921.

The 2.9 miles (4.7 km) 4 ft 8 1/2 in (1,435 mm) gauge Weston-super-Mare Tramways network opened on 12 May 1902. The main route ran from Birnbeck Pier along the sea front to the Sanatorium (now Royal Sands); a branch line ran to the railway station and on to the tram depot in Locking Road. The Weston-super-Mare fleet originally consisted of 12 double deck cars and 4 open-sided "toast rack" cars.

The remaining tram services in Somerset came to an end during the 1930s. In 1937 the Bristol Tramways bought out the Weston-super-Mare Tramways and converted them to bus operation. Bath was not far behind, replacing all its tram routes with buses during 1938 and 1939.

== Buses ==
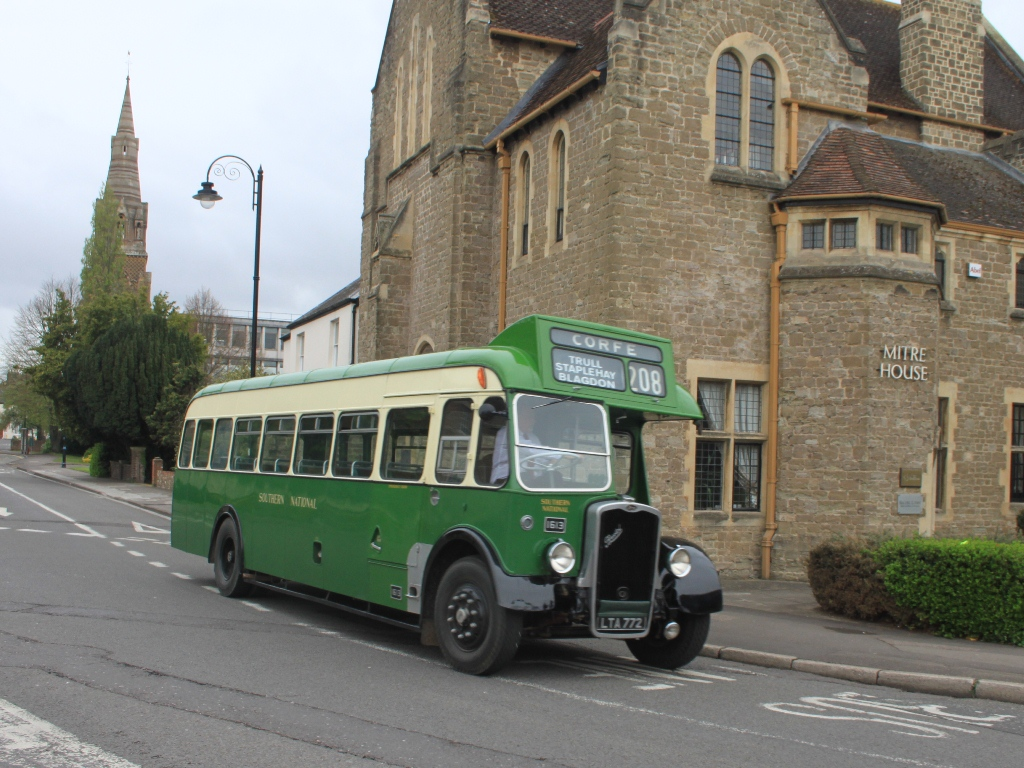
A preserved Southern National bus (built in 1951) in Taunton

In 1905 the Great Western Railway started a steam bus service from Highbridge railway station to Burnham-on-Sea and Cheddar. The following year a number of services were tried that radiated from Bridgwater, but all had been withdrawn by the end of 1911.

Meanwhile, Bristol Tramways started bus services from Bristol to towns and villages in north Somerset, first with a service in 1906 linking the tramway systems of Bristol and Bath. Bristol Tramways opened depots in Bath in 1909, Weston-super-Mare in 1910 and Wells in 1922, and by 1922 was running services between Bristol, Weston-super-Mare and Wells, and to Bridgwater, Street and Frome.

Further south the National Omnibus & Transport Company opened depots at Bridgwater, South Petherton and Taunton in 1920, and Yeovil and Wincanton in 1921. National extended northwards to Weston-super-Mare in response to competition from Bristol Tramways. In west Somerset, a network of services was built up by Minehead and District Motor Services, acquired by National in 1927. The Great Western Railway's buses returned to the area with local services at Weston-super-Mare and Portishead in 1928 but by then the railway company was already in negotiation with bus companies about merging their operations. On 1 January 1929 National transferred its Somerset operations to two joint venture companies. The Yeovil area services went to Southern National, jointly owned by National and the Southern Railway, and the other services went to Western National, jointly owned by National and the Great Western Railway. On the same date the railway company bought a majority of the shares in the Bristol Tramways and Carriage Company (although this was reduced to just 50% after 16 months) which took on the railway bus services in its area.

In Bath motor bus services were started by Bath Electric Tramways Company in 1905, and from 1920 operated by a separate company, Bath Tramways Motors. Both companies were acquired by Bristol Tramways in 1936.

From 1929 to 1983 most bus services in Somerset were run by Bristol Tramways (renamed Bristol Omnibus Company in 1957) in the north, by Western National in the south and west, and by Southern National (until 1969 when it was merged into Western National) in the south-east. All three companies were nationalised in 1948. In the south-east of the county three independent companies survived for many years. Hutchings and Cornelius of South Petherton operated from 1934 (Hutchings from 1926 and Cornelius from 1928) until 1979. Safeway, also based in South Petherton, operated from 1928 until 2008. Further east, Wakes Services based at Sparkford ran a network of bus services between Yeovil and Shepton Mallet from the 1930s until 1999.

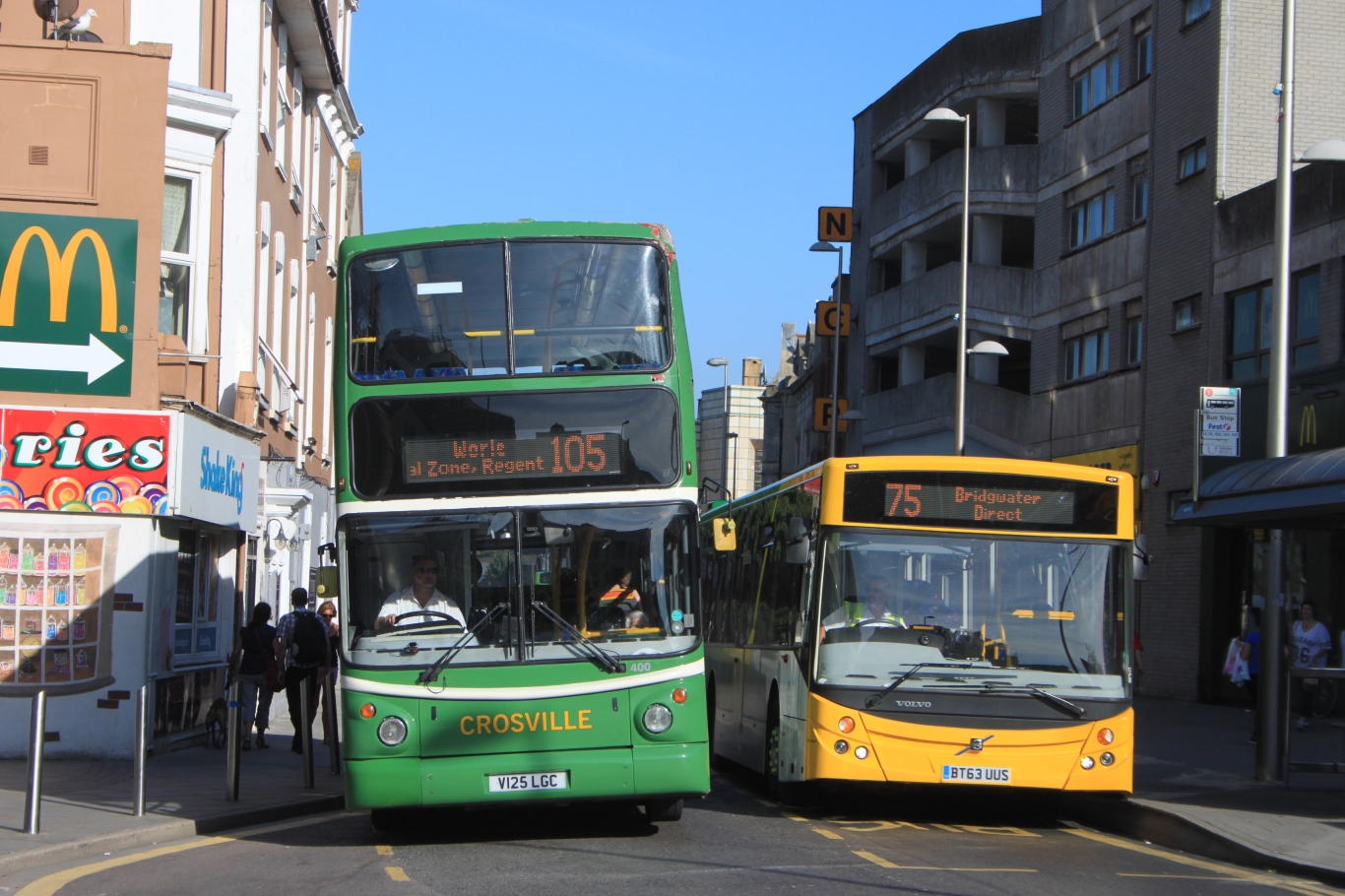
Crosville (left) and Webberbus services in Weston-super-Mare, 2015

In the 1980s both Bristol Omnibus Company and Western National were privatised. In preparation both companies were split. In 1983, the Somerset operations of Western National were transferred to a new subsidiary company, Southern National, and in 1986 Bristol's Somerset services were transferred to a subsidiary company called Badgerline. Both companies were sold to their managements. In 1995 Badgerline became part of First Bus, and in 1999 Southern National was acquired by First Bus. First combined and rebranded its Somerset operations in a single company, First Somerset & Avon. In 2014 the services in the south and west of the county were rebranded as The Buses of Somerset.

First now has a monopoly in most of the county, although there are some independent operators. In the north Abus has operated routes from Bristol into Somerset since 1991, joined more recently by Wessex Connect and other operators. South West Coaches has developed a network of services in the Yeovil area, having acquired Wakes Services in 1999 and Safeway in 2008. Webberbus operated some services in south west Somerset and Weston-super-Mare until 2016 while between 2004 and 2017 Nippy Bus operated a small network around Yeovil. Stagecoach South West has also started operations in Somerset. It won some council tenders and opened a depot in Yeovil in 2005, and in 2007 purchased Cooks Coaches of Wellington, which operated buses in the Taunton area.

== Present day networks ==
=== Road ===
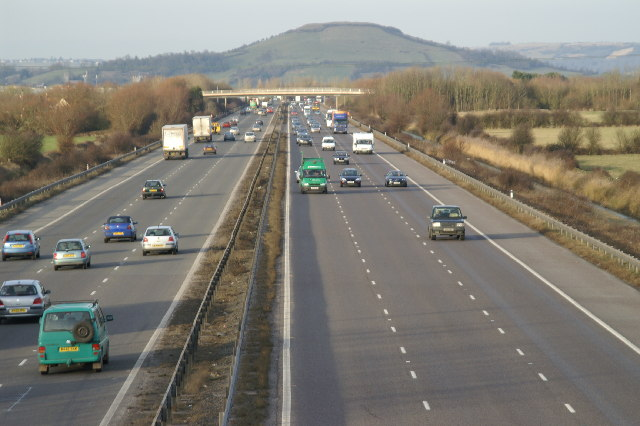
The M5 motorway crossing the Somerset Levels near Brent Knoll

Somerset has 6,531 kilometres (4,058 mi) of roads, ranging from motorways to narrow country lanes. There were 32 deaths on the county's roads in 2010, the fewest in 20 years.

The M5 motorway from Birmingham to Exeter provides a north–south trunk route from the Avonmouth Bridge in the north, to the Devon border in the south, with eight junctions in the county:

- Junction 19 (Portishead) with the A369 and close to the Royal Portbury Dock
- Junction 20 (Clevedon) with the B3133
- Junction 21 (Weston-super-Mare) with the A370 and close to the A371
- Junction 22 (Burnham-on-Sea) with the A38
- Junction 23 (Puriton) with the A38 and A39 north of Bridgwater
- Junction 24 (North Petherton) with the A38 south of Bridgwater
- Junction 25 (Taunton) with the A358
- Junction 26 (Wellington) with the A38

The older A370 and A38 roads serve many of the same towns as the motorway. The other principal north–south route through the county is the A37 which links Bristol with Shepton Mallet and Yeovil.

The nearest east–west motorway is the M4 from London to Wales which runs just beyond the northern boundary of the county. It intersects with the M5 at Almondsbury (M5 junction 20, M4 junction 15) north west of Bristol, and serves Bath via the A46 from Junction 18. The equivalent A4 passes inside the county boundary through Keynsham and Bath. The other principal east–west routes are:

- A371 from Shepton Mallet, Wells and Cheddar to Weston-super-Mare
- A39 from Bath to Wells, Glastonbury, Bridgwater, Williton, Minehead and north Devon
- A358 from Chard to Ilminster, Taunton and Williton
- A303 from M3 motorway at Basingstoke to Devon via Wincanton and Ilminster.

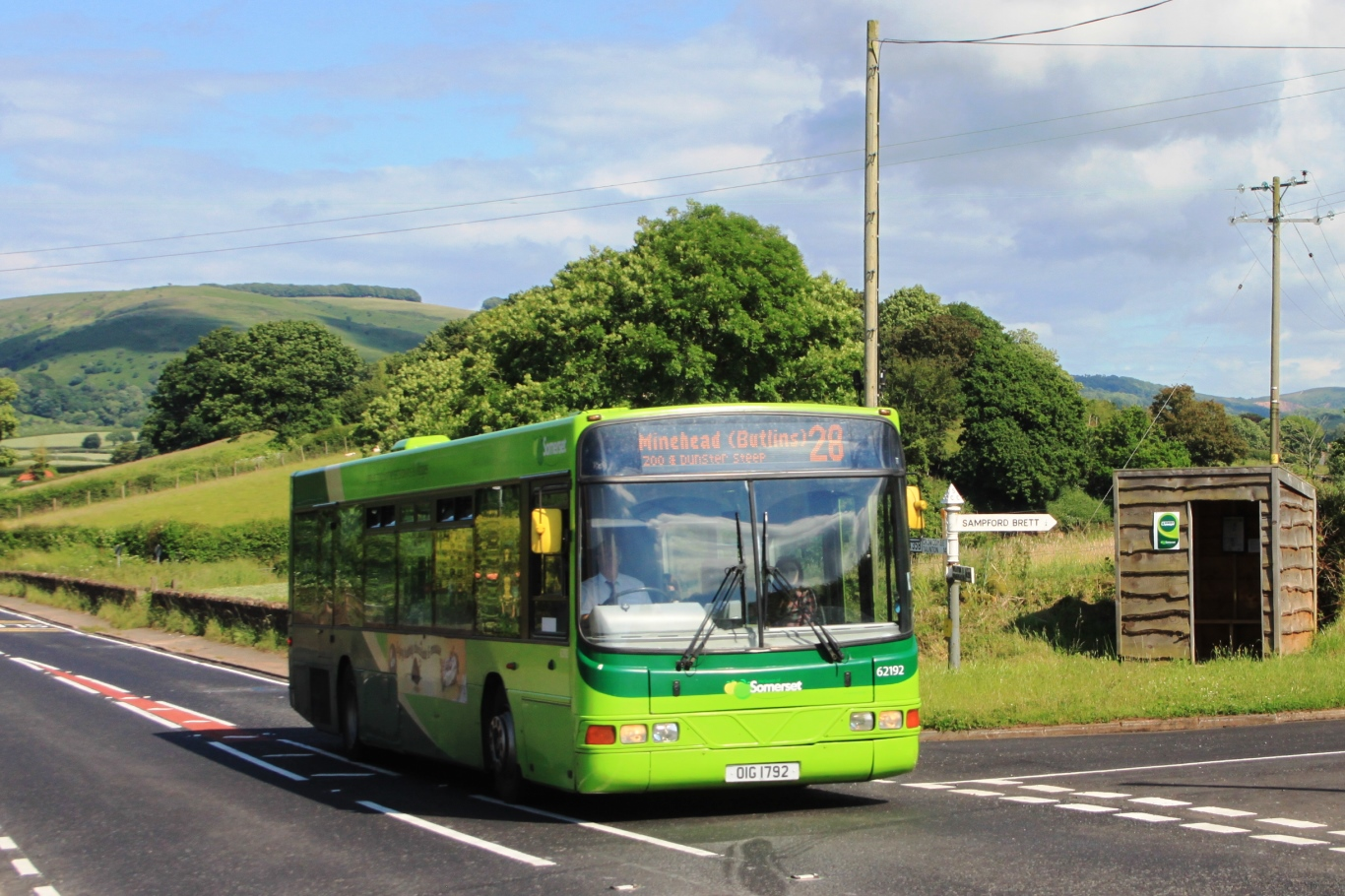
One of The Buses of Somerset near Williton

People are encouraged to use integrated transport routes by maps that show how bus routes link with the railway network. Car-sharing is promoted by multi-occupancy traffic lanes to reduce the number of cars with just a driver and no passengers. The county council, unitary authorities and Bristol City Council subsidise many bus services, for example there is a £70 million scheme to improve services and facilities on ten routes that link Bristol with areas outside the city. This includes 5 miles (8 km) of bus lanes and improved bus stops. However cuts in funding across local services in 2011 included a reduction of 46% (that is £2.6 million) in the subsidies paid by Somerset County Council to bus operators, leading to the withdrawal of at least five services and many reductions in routes and service levels during evenings and weekends.

The dominant bus operator in the north and east of the county is First West of England which has a network of routes between all the main population centres while sister company The Buses of Somerset serves the south and west. Other services are provided by Wessex Connect in the north of the county and Stagecoach Somerset in the south.

There are also some independent operators such as Abus and Nippy Bus Park and ride schemes link out-of-town car parks with the centres of both Bath and Taunton.

=== Other rights of way ===
Long-distance footpaths in the county include: Coleridge Way, Limestone Link, Macmillan Way West, Mendip Way, Monarch's Way, Quantock Greenway, River Parrett Trail, Two Tunnels Greenway and West Deane Way. The South West Coast Path National Trail has its starting point at Minehead.

The county has one of the first National cycle routes created in Britain 3, 4 and 24 provide cyclists with ways to minimise contact with motor traffic. The Bristol & Bath Railway Path is a 15-mile off-road cycleway, following an old railway track that forms part of Route 4. The path consists of a 3-m-wide tarmacked surface, and was used for 2.4 million trips in 2007, increasing by 10% per year. Route 24, otherwise known as the Colliers Way, currently runs from Dundas Aqueduct to Frome via Radstock, There were public debates about the various proposals to use part of this network as a rapid transit route.

=== Rail ===
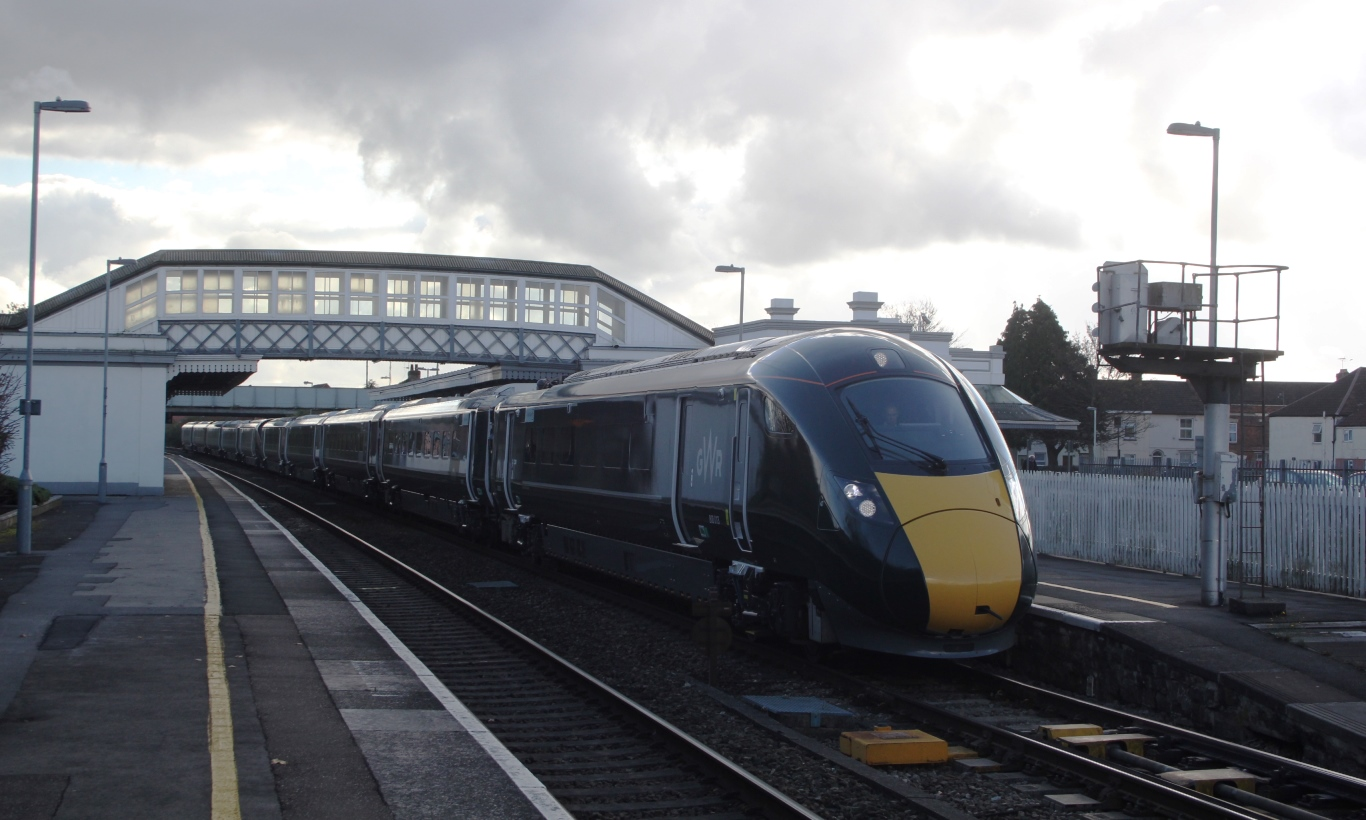
Great Western Railway service to London at Bridgwater

Somerset's rail network has three west–east routes linking the county with London. The busiest is the Great Western Main Line through Bath Spa which offers two trains each hour for much of the week from Bristol Temple Meads to London Paddington. In the middle of the county the London to Penzance Line links Taunton and Castle Cary with Paddington, while in the south the London to Exeter Line links Crewkerne, Yeovil Junction and Templecombe with London Waterloo.

The principal north–south route carries frequent local services serving Nailsea and Backwell, Yatton, Worle, Weston Milton, Weston-super-Mare, Highbridge and Burnham, and Bridgwater, and also CrossCountry services between Cornwall/Devon and North of England/Scotland. This route also sees some services from the Great Western Main Line which are extended south of Bristol.

Another north–south route links Keynsham, Oldfield Park and Bath with Frome, Bruton, Castle Cary, and Yeovil Pen Mill.

Most services and stations are operated by Great Western Railway. The exceptions are the West of England line (London Waterloo to Exeter St Davids, which is the responsibility of South Western Railway, and trains to the north which are operated by CrossCountry. Most stations have car parking and easy connections to bus services serving local towns and villages, with "PlusBus" ticketing valid on both buses and trains in many areas. The larger stations have a staffed ticket office but elsewhere they can be purchased from ticket vending machines or from the conductor on the train.

The busiest stations are Bath Spa, with more than four million passengers each year, and Taunton and Weston-super-Mare with around one million. The busiest in South Somerset is Yeovil Junction but the least used in the whole county is Bruton.

	2002-03	2004-05	2005-06	2006-07	2007-08	2008-09	2009-10
Bath Spa	3,332,671	3,726,900	3,905,144	4,244,776	4,478,305	4,757,904	4,779,480
Taunton	768,300	837,001	903,807	951,650	1,076,796	1,184,866	1,191,558
Weston-super-Mare	716,827	799,414	836,036	857,777	935,569	963,626	935,814
Yeovil Junction	155,441	174,456	192,645	194,798	209,290	215,688	210,786
Bruton	14,706	17,167	18,449	19,369	18,520	23,444	25,576

The statistics show the total number of station entries and exits and cover twelve month periods that start each year in April.

The West Somerset Railway operates to ten stations between Minehead and Bishops Lydeard on around 240 days each year using heritage steam and diesel trains. A regular bus service links the stations at Bishops Lydeard and Taunton to give connections through to the national railway network.

=== Water ===
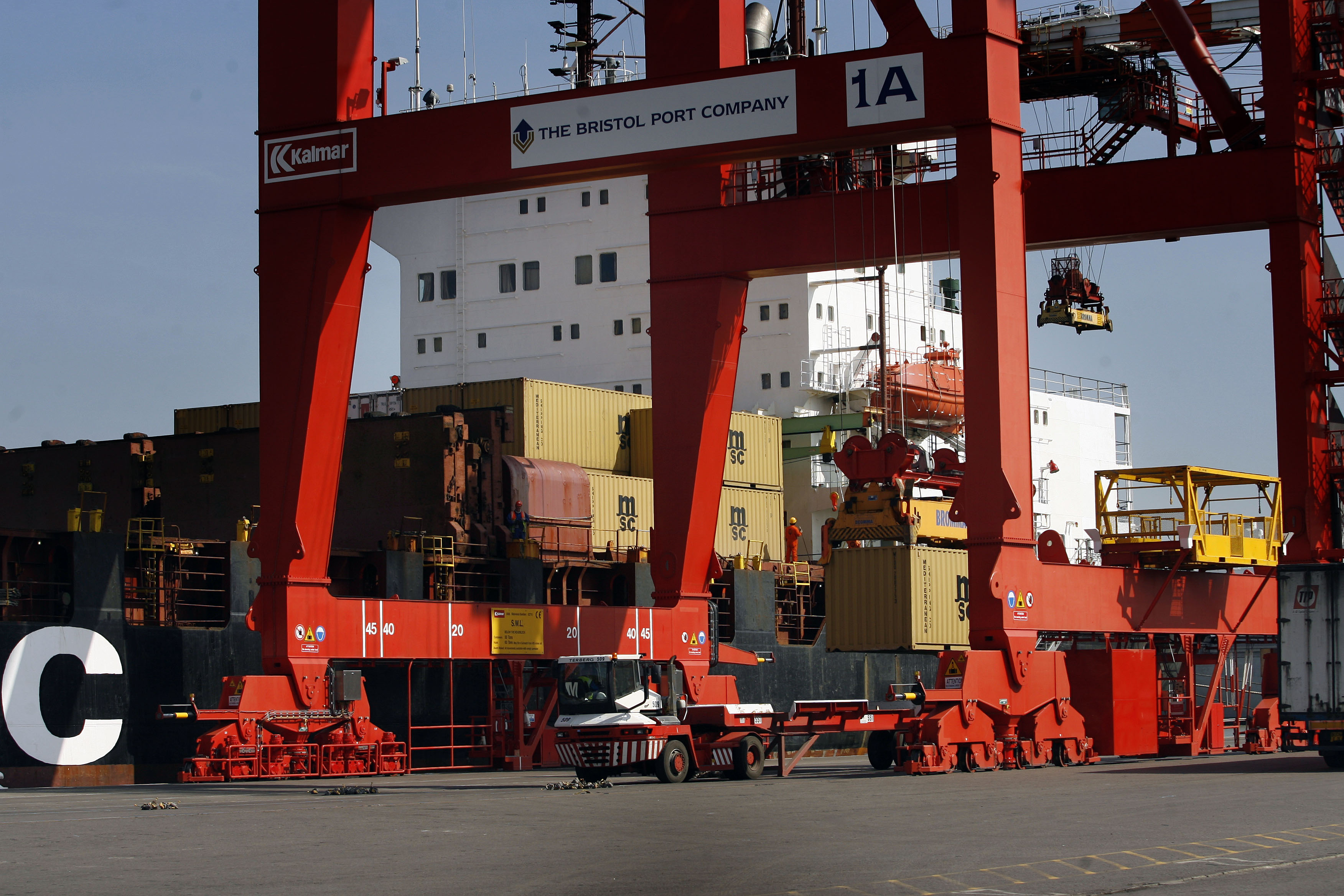
A container ship at Royal Portbury Dock

The largest dock in Somerset is the Royal Portbury Dock, a part of the Port of Bristol. Its main traffic is cars, bulk cargoes and forest products.

The other principal port in the county is the Port of Bridgwater. Sedgemoor District Council acts as the Competent Harbour Authority for the port and provides pilotage services for all boats over 98 feet (30 m) using the River Parrett, an important service as the large tidal range (which can exceed 39 feet or 12 metres) results in frequent changes in the navigable channel. Bulk cargoes are handled at Dunball wharf. Marine sand and gravel accounted for 55,754 tonnes and salt products 21,170 tonnes out of the 90,213 tonnes handled in the port in 2006; however, in 2008 the only product handled in the port was 46,688 tonnes of sand and gravel. A roll-on roll-off berth at Combwich is used occasionally for the transfer of heavy goods for the nuclear power stations at Hinkley Point.

Combwich Pill and the River Brue estuary at Burnham-on-Sea both provide recreational moorings. Knightstone Island in Weston-super-Mare, Minehead harbour, Clevedon Pier and Dunball wharf are used by the MV Balmoral and PS Waverley for leisure trips around the Bristol Channel, Severn Estuary and up the River Avon to Bristol.

There are two inland waterways in the county. The western end of the Kennet and Avon Canal is at Bath where it connects with the River Avon. The Bridgwater and Taunton Canal, along with the River Tone navigation links the River Parrett at Bridgwater with Taunton. The maximum size of vessels that can navigate the whole length of each canal is given below, but larger ones can be used on most parts of these waterways.

Dimension	Kennet and Avon	Bridgwater and Taunton
Length	70.87 feet (21.60 m)	50.00 feet (15.24 m)
Width	13.78 feet (4.20 m)	10.00 feet (3.05 m)
Draft	4.07 feet (1.24 m)	2.75 feet (0.84 m)
Headroom	7.87 feet (2.40 m)	7.17 feet (2.19 m)

=== Air ===
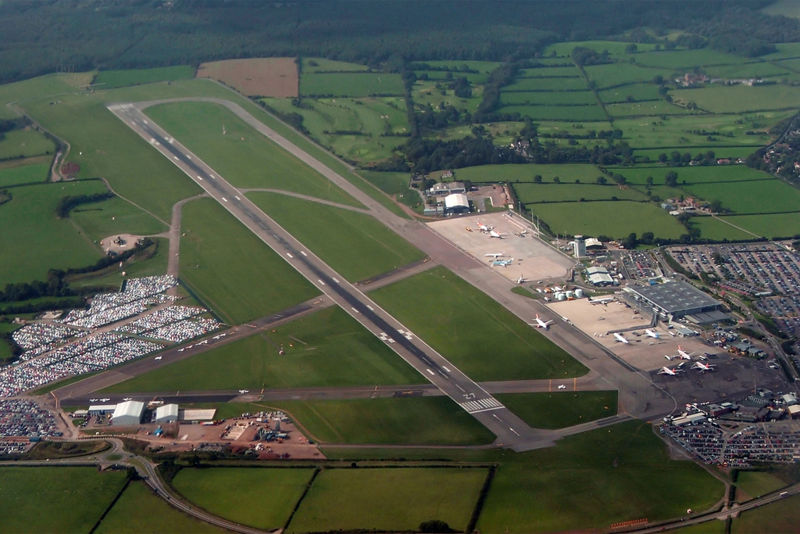
Bristol Airport

The only public passenger airport in use in the county is Bristol Airport which developed from a former Royal Air Force base, Lulsgate Bottom, after World War II. A number of privately run air strips and airfields exist, but none are licensed for commercial flights, or flight training. Henstridge Airfield near Henstridge, south east of Wincanton, was commissioned in 1943. The Dorset and Somerset Air Ambulance operates from there.

== Future strategy and proposals ==
The dominance of the car, and the convenience it offers: local authorities in Somerset have various proposals in place to try to ease the current "gridlock" that is now occurring on the roads throughout the county. The removal of traffic from city centres has now become a priority in Somerset, due to the antiquity of many of its towns and cities. These were originally designed for the movement of people, not large metal boxes on wheels. Since the privatisation of many areas of public transport, cities like Bath have many large buses, which in the 1950s would have been full of passengers; these can now be seen (in 2009) conveying only a small number of people at a time.

One outcome that was not foreseen as a result of the closure of many branch lines in the 1960s was the loss of public access to those rights of way established by the various railway companies. Those structures of level ground upon which so much energy and labour was expended, could have been put to good use in the past, e.g. rapid transit routes. The loss of continuity in the system as a whole, means that what remains of these rail trackways are now the subject of competition between human power and motorised rapid transit solutions.

Taunton metro rail (TMR) is a proposed light rail network using a combination of existing rail infrastructure and the construction of new infrastructure in the area of Taunton.

A charity, the New Somerset and Dorset Railway, was set up in 2009 with the aim of purchasing infrastructure and lobbying government.

== See also ==
- Taunton bus station
- Transport in England
