= Chard branch line =

Two former railway lines serving the town of Chard in Somerset, England

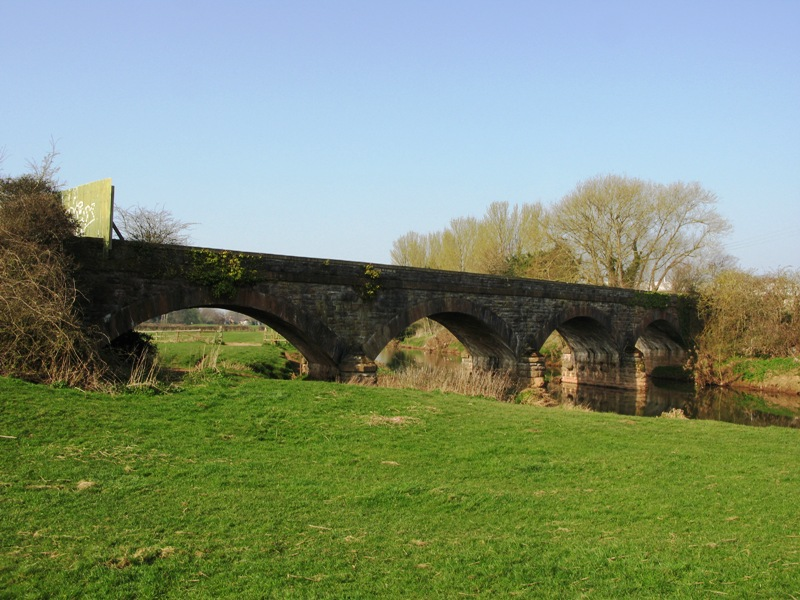
- The bridge over the River Tone at Creech St Michael

Overview
- Status: Dismantled
- Owner: LSWR/SR (from Chard Jn); B&ER/GWR (from Creech)
- Locale: Somerset
- Termini: Chard Junction and Taunton; Chard Central
- Stations: 8

Service
- Type: Cross country

History
- Opened: 1863 (from Chard Jn); 1866 (from Creech)
- Closed: 1962

Technical
- Line length: 3.06 mi (4.9 km) (from Chard Jn); 12.79 mi (20.6 km) (from Creech)
- Number of tracks: 1
- Track gauge: 4 ft 8 1/2 in (1,435 mm)

The Chard branch lines were two lines serving the town of Chard in Somerset, England. One was a northward branch, opened in 1863, from the Salisbury to Exeter main line, and the other, opened in 1866, ran south-eastwards from the Bristol – Taunton main line. Each branch had its own Chard passenger station at first, although the two lines connected in Chard.

Although the town had an important history, it was declining during the second half of the twentieth century and the branch lines retained a rural character.

They were operated as a single entity from 1917, but finally closed to passenger traffic in 1962, and to goods traffic in 1966.

== Before the railway ==
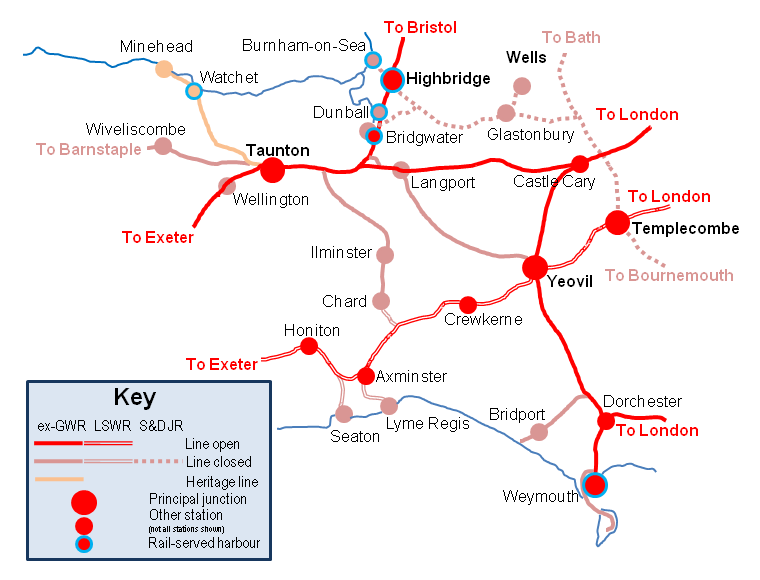
The local railway network

Chard had been an important commercial centre in the eighteenth century, based on linen drapery, shoemaking, wool and machine-made lace and cloth manufacture; during the canal age, a canal was built to connect the town to the Bridgwater and Taunton Canal at Creech St. Michael. It was completed in 1842 but it was never commercially viable.

The Bristol and Exeter Railway (B&ER) had opened its line to Taunton on 1 July 1842, giving rail access to London. The canal company sought parliamentary approval to convert the canal to a railway, and it obtained an act of Parliament, the Chard Canal and Railway Act 1846 (9 & 10 Vict. c. ccxv), to do so between Creech St Michael on the B&ER to Ilminster. The act was passed on 16 July 1846; the company obtained a second act of Parliament, the Chard Railway Act 1847 (10 & 11 Vict. c. clxxv), to extend the railway to Chard. However the Chard Canal Company was in financial difficulty at this time and the necessary capital was not available; the powers lapsed, and the Chard Canal Company went into bankruptcy administration in 1853.

== Connection to South Western line ==
From 1856, the route of what became the Salisbury to Exeter main line was becoming firmer, after a considerable time spent in wrangling over alternatives: at last there were definite plans for a direct southern, narrow gauge route from Exeter to London. (Note: The Great Western Railway and the Bristol & Exeter Railway, working in partnership, had operated a route from Exeter to London via Bristol since 1844; their railways used the broad gauge of 7 ft 1/4 in (2,140 mm). The rival railways in league with the London and South Western Railway used the standard gauge of 4 ft 8 1/2 in (1,435 mm), usually described as the narrow gauge in contrast. More information can be found at track gauge.)

The people of Chard discovered that this line would not pass through their town, but there would be a station on the new main line, then described simply as "three miles west of Winsham". (The station when built was called Chard Road, and it was two miles (3 km) from the town.) Wanting a closer railway connection, promoters in the town met in November 1859 and resolved that "a railway from the London and South Western Railway, with a tramroad to the canal basin, is of great importance to the prosperity of the town". They promoted an independent "Chard Railway Company", obtaining the Chard Railway Act 1860 (23 & 24 Vict. c. lxiv) on 25 May 1860 with a share capital of £25,000 and authorised loans of £8,300, to construct a railway from the town to the main line, and also a horse-operated goods tramway to the canal basin.

The London and South Western Railway (L&SWR) opened its Chard Road station on 19 July 1860. The Chard Railway Company started construction work on its line on 1 November 1860. The contractor for the line found himself unable to discharge his obligations and had to be replaced; this was followed by the second contractor failing too and the engineer to the line also departing. Meanwhile, the Chard company's chairman, called Loveridge, negotiated purchase with the L&SWR company, while hinting at alliance with the rival broad gauge interest, and the sale was agreed for the sum of £20,000, taking effect in April 1861, so that completion and operation of the branch now fell to the L&SWR.

The branch line was opened on 8 May 1863. The Chard station was at the junction of East Street and Victoria Road. It may have been called Chard Town from the start. The line was worked by the L&SWR company. The first train was hauled by a coke-burning 2-2-2 well tank called Firefly, believed to have been built specially for the line. The initial train service was six trips each way, with three on Sundays.

Chard Road station was renamed Chard Junction in 1872.

== Branch from Taunton ==
Even while the line to the L&SWR was being built, there was great enthusiasm for another line, to the county town, through Ilminster, considered to be in need of a railway connection. The connection to the LSWR had been foremost because of its closeness, but the L&SWR did not offer convenient connection to the manufacturing areas of the Midlands and the North-West.

Chard and Taunton Railway Act 1861
- Act of Parliament
- Parliament of the United Kingdom
- Long title: An Act for making a Railway to connect Chard and Taunton in the County of Somerset, and for other Purposes.
- Citation: 24 & 25 Vict. c. ccxliii

Dates
- Royal assent: 6 August 1861

The Chard and Taunton Railway (Note: Carter calls it the Chard Ilminster and Taunton Railway) got parliamentary authority to build its line in the Chard and Taunton Railway Act 1861 (24 & 25 Vict. c. ccxliii) of 6 August 1861. It was to build a 15 1/2-mile (25 km) line as a first stage to connecting the Bristol and English Channels. (Note: From Bridgwater B&ER via Chard and Axmouth Bay, i.e. Seaton)

The Bristol and Exeter Railway was anxious to keep the L&SWR well away from Taunton and therefore made friendly overtures. However the company was unable to raise the money required. It was dissolved by the Bristol and Exeter Railway Act 1863 (26 & 27 Vict. c. lx), by which the B&ER was authorised to build the line, and to close the Chard Canal and to sell the land it owned that was not required.

The B&ER built a broad gauge single-track line from Creech Junction on its main line (a little west of the later Creech St Michael Halt), 2 1/2 miles (4 km) east of Taunton to a station at Chard. The line was 12 miles 61 chains (20.5 km) long, and opened on 11 September 1866 to passengers, goods traffic being made ready in March 1867. Stations were built at Hatch, Ilminster and Chard.

The Chard Joint Station was located at the northern end of Victoria Road, on the site of the earlier canal basin. The L&SWR had extended its line to the B&ER station by simply connecting to the horse tramway to the canal basin. It presented it for approval to the Board of Trade inspector on the same day as the much longer B&ER branch was inspected, but it was rejected, and the L&SWR had to upgrade it for passenger operation, opening the line on 26 November 1866.

The station had an all-over roof, sheltering a platform and a single track. There was a bay at each end. The broad gauge of the B&ER and the narrow gauge of the L&SWR were separate at the Joint station, except that the turntable was of mixed gauge, accessible from each company's track. The connecting line passed the original Town station, leaving it on a stub. L&SWR trains from Chard Junction entered the Town station, and then backed out to the through line, and then proceeded to the Joint station.

Each company had its own station master and staff, and its own signalbox and booking office. Some L&SWR trains were diverted to by-pass the original Town station, and from 1871 an unstaffed platform with a shelter was provided on the Joint line adjacent to the Town station. Eaton-Lacey says that the L&SWR "had ideas of closing the old terminus and constructing a new station on the spur platform, but the intentions did not come to fruition".

An intermediate station called Thorne Falcon was opened in 1871, renamed Thorne in 1890 and again renamed Thornfalcon in 1902.

The Great Western Railway (GWR) absorbed the B&ER on 1 January 1876. The GWR gradually changed the gauge of branch lines in the area to the narrow gauge. However, there were competitive concerns that the L&SWR company would apply for running powers over the northern part of the Chard branch to get access to Taunton, so they delayed the gauge conversion of the Chard line: by 1884 it was the only broad gauge line east of Exeter. However it was eventually converted on 19 July 1891.

== In the twentieth century ==
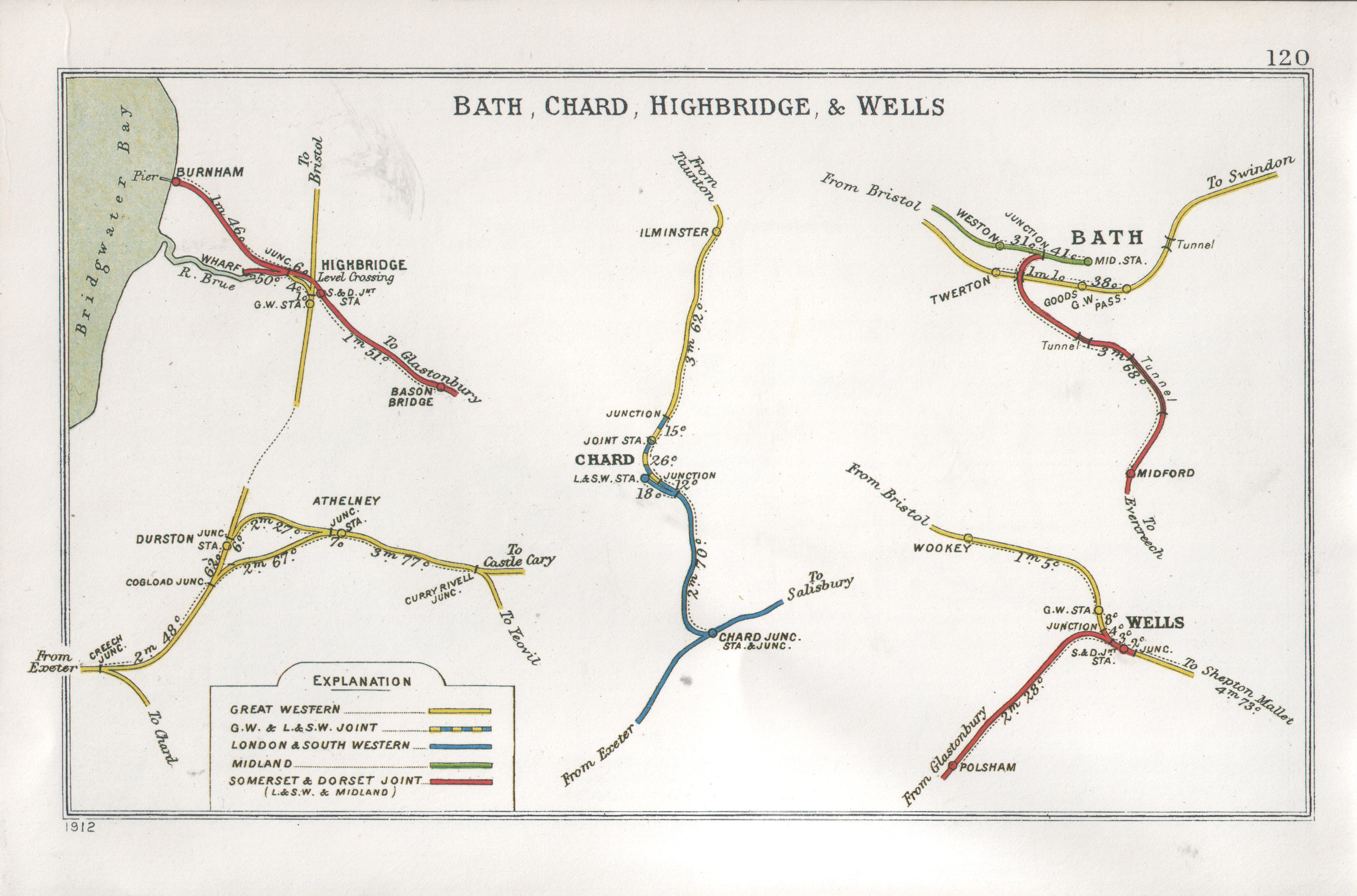
A 1912 Railway Clearing House Junction Diagram showing (centre) railways in the vicinity of Chard. GWR in yellow; L&SWR in blue

In 1910 the L&SWR and the GWR made an agreement aimed at securing economies in localities where both companies had an activity. One consequence of the agreement was that the L&SWR Chard Town station (including the platform on the spur line) would close and the GWR would provide the passenger service throughout from Taunton to Chard Junction. This arrangement was given effect on 1 January 1917. Separate signal boxes were maintained until 1928.

In 1923 the Grouping of the railways took place, pursuant to the Railways Act 1921 and the L&SWR was a constituent part of the new Southern Railway (SR).

In 1928 Chard Joint station was renamed simply Chard; two additional stations were opened in 1928 on the GWR section: Donyatt Halt south of Ilminster, and Ilton Halt north of Ilminster. Both railways were nationalised in 1948 but were initially managed as two separate regions – the GWR becoming the Western Region and the SR became the Southern Region.

In November 1935 the engine turntable at Chard was removed, as tank engines were in use on the line.

In 1949 Chard station was renamed Chard Central.

A fuel shortage in 1951 led to the line being temporarily closed from 3 February to 7 May.

The sparse population in the area, and more convenient bus services, made the passenger train service of dubious viability, and a census in July 1961 showed that an average of only 155 fare paying passengers alighted from branch trains, including at Chard Junction and Taunton; an average of four passengers alighted from the trains arriving at Chard station.

Passenger services were withdrawn permanently on 10 September 1962 and the line closed completely between Creech and Chard on 6 July 1964. Public goods traffic was retained at the original Town station at Chard until 3 October 1966.

The line was suggested in 2019 by Campaign for a Better Transport as a 'priority 2' candidate for reopening.

== Stations ==
All stations were closed on 10 September 1962 unless noted otherwise.

=== Thornfalcon ===
51.010°N 3.036°W

The B&ER opened a station to serve Thornfalcon village in 1871. Originally named 'Thorne Falcon', it was renamed 'Thorn' by the GWR in July 1890, but was renamed again to 'Thornfalcon' on 1 January 1902. After passenger services were withdrawn the goods yard remained open for nearly two more years, finally closing on 6 July 1964. Just one wooden platform was provided, but this was later rebuilt in concrete. The station has been demolished to make way for the A358 road. A nearby road bridge over the route has been designated as a Grade II listed building.

=== Hatch ===
50.979°N 2.992°W

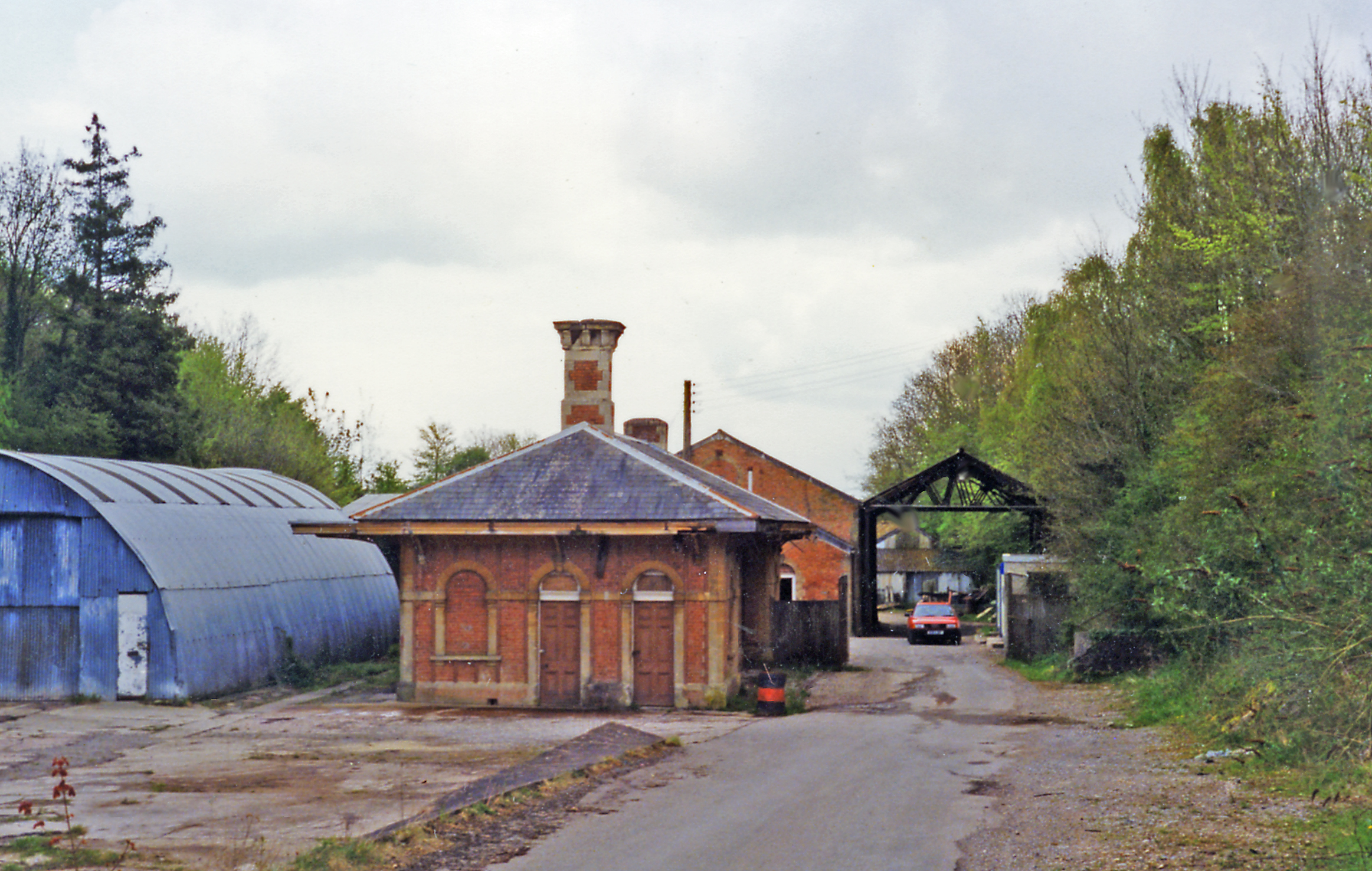
Hatch station building in 1995

This is one of the two original stations between Taunton and Chard. It is a Brunel inspired Chalet-style station that served the village of Hatch Beauchamp. A goods shed was provided, and a signal box too from 1892 until 1956 to control a goods loop. Both the passenger and goods buildings are still standing and occupied by industrial users.

A 154-yard (141 m) tunnel is located a short distance to the north of the station.

=== Ilton Halt ===
50.948°N 2.935°W

Opened on 26 May 1928, this was another simple single platform. This one was a concrete construction on an embankment to serve the village of Ilton. A small wooden shelter was provided, and a wartime pill box was built at the north end of the platform.

=== Ilminster ===
50.930°N 2.928°W

This was one of the B&ER's original stations. It had just a single platform by a loop was provided to allow goods trains to pass. A goods shed and yard was situated to the south of the passenger station. Both the main buildings still stand in commercial use.

=== Donyatt Halt ===
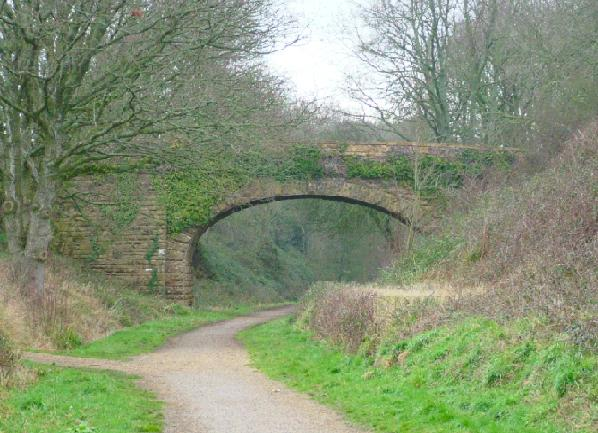
The site of Donyatt Halt

50.921°N 2.938°W This was a small single platform halt opened by the GWR on 5 May 1928 served the local community around Donyatt. It was constructed from sleepers laid horizontally and pegged together to form a basic platform structure. A small wooden shelter was provided. Access to the platform was by crossing over the bridge at the Ilminster end of the station and going down an inclined path.

The halt is next to some World War II defences used on the Taunton Stop Line, with anti-tank traps around the station. During the threat of invasion, an inspection post could be quickly set up between Donyatt and Ilminster to stop and check the trains before allowing them to proceed.

The halt was rebuilt in 2009 as part of a cycle track enhancement project. It was restored between 2025 and 2026 during which work vegetation and brash were cleared from the site.

=== Chard ===
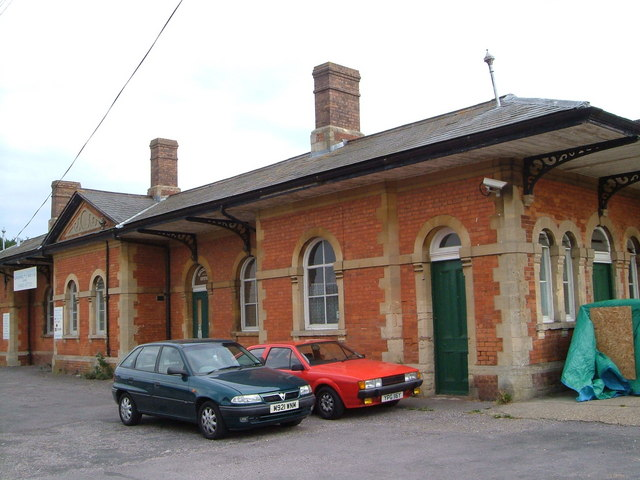
The Chard Central station building in 2006

50.877°N 2.955°W

The joint station was opened on 11 September 1866 when the B&ER opened their branch from Taunton; the L&SWR added their connecting line from Chard Town two months later. The L&SWR was built to 4 ft 8 1/2 in (1,435 mm) standard gauge but the B&ER was a 7 ft (2,134 mm) broad gauge until 19 July 1891. The two companies maintained separate signal boxes and staff.

The station was initially referred to as 'Chard Joint'. It was renamed as plain 'Chard' on 1 March 1928, but it appeared as such in GWR timetables before that date.

There was a platform covered by a train shed for through trains, and a terminal bay platform at either end. The southern bay platform fell out of use in 1917 when the GWR took to operating trains through to Chard Junction. The sidings at the Southern end of the station were all removed by October 1927 and the signal box at this end of the station was closed the following year. Another name change under British Railways ownership saw it become 'Chard Central' on 26 September 1949. Passenger trains ceased to be operated on 11 September 1962, public goods traffic on 3 February 1964, and private goods traffic on 3 October 1966. The station building and train shed still stand and are in use as a retail outlet.

=== Chard Town ===
50.8741°N 2.9566°W The first station located in the town was the L&SWR's Chard Town terminus. This single platform opened in 1860 but in 1866 a new line was constructed from just short of the platform to allow trains to enter the new Chard Joint station. For five years trains from the Junction called at Chard Town and then reversed to the connecting line and then resumed their forward journey to the Joint station; trains in the opposite direction had to reverse into the Town station. In 1871 a new platform was opened on the connecting line. The station closed to passengers on 1 January 1917 and was then the main goods station for the town until it finally closed on 18 April 1966.

=== Chard Junction ===
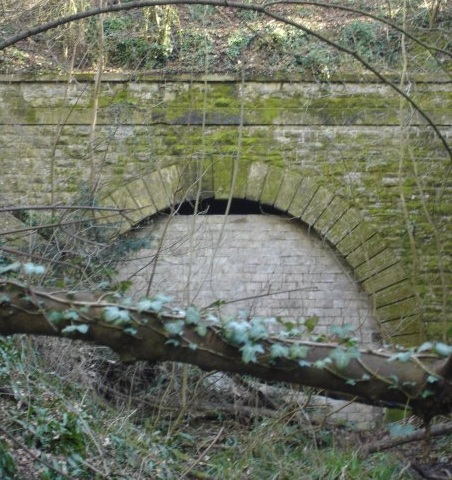
The former tunnel near Hatch station.

50.83925°N 2.93665°W

This station was opened by the L&SWR on 19 July 1860, as 'Chard Road' on the route from London Waterloo station to Exeter. The word 'Road' in the station name indicated that whilst it was intended to serve Chard, it was not in the town but rather on the road outside. The branch to Chard opened on 8 May 1863 but the station was not renamed 'Chard Junction' until August 1872. The platform used by branch services was on the north side of the station forecourt, instead of alongside the main platforms which is the usual arrangement at most junction stations. The track layout did not allow trains to run directly between the branch and main line, instead traffic to and from the branch had to be shunted through a connection in the goods yard which was at the Exeter end of the station between the main and branch lines.

It was closed by British Rail on 7 March 1966. The signal box built in 1875 was retained to control sidings and a passing loop and was only replaced by a more modern structure in 1982.

== Gradients ==
Running north from Chard Junction, the line climbed at first at 1 in 80 and then at varying gradients between 1 in 200 and 1 in 94 until the divergence from the Town station line at Chard. Then it fell at an average of 1 in 80 almost to Donyatt Halt. The general level from there to Creech Junction is flat, but there were some switchbacks climbing briefly to Ilton and falling again, repeating that at Hatch, and rising again at 1 in 80 to a local summit at Ash, falling again at the same gradient.

== Services ==
The branch was initially operated as two separate lines, one from Taunton and one from Chard Junction. From 1917 the GWR operated both sections, but trains were normally advertised as separate services either side of Chard. For example, on weekdays, in 1920 there were six trains between Taunton and Chard and five between Chard Junction and Chard, but only two of these were advertised as through services from Taunton to Chard Junction and there were no through services in the opposite direction. In 1947 the six trains to Taunton and nine to Chard Junction appeared in different time tables with no indication of through services. Even as late as 1958 there were no advertised through services from Taunton to Chard Junction, and only two of the five services in the opposite direction, though by now they did appear as part of the same timetable. The journey between Taunton and Chard took about 40 minutes; between Chard Central and Chard Junction was just eight minutes.
