= Taunton Tramway =

Tramway company in Taunton, England

Taunton
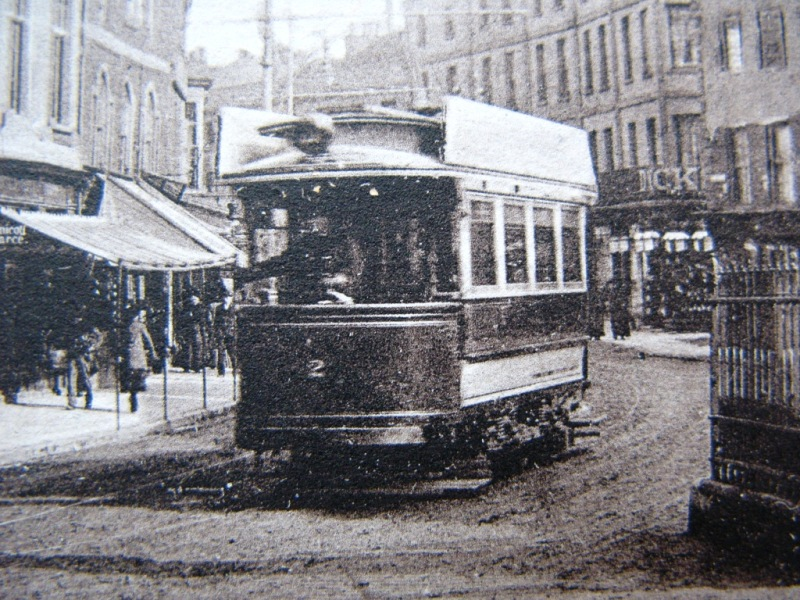
- Single-deck car 2 at the end of Fore Street

Operation
- Locale: Taunton, Somerset
- Open: 1901
- Close: 1921
- Routes: East Reach to Rowbarton
- Owner: Taunton Electric Traction Company

Infrastructure
- Track gauge: 3 ft 6 in (1,067 mm)
- Propulsion system: Electric
- Electrification: overhead lines
- Depot: East Reach
- Stock: 1901–1905: 6 double-deck cars 1905–1921: 6 single-deck cars

Statistics
- Route length: 1.66 miles (2.67 km)

The Taunton Tramway was an electric street tramway in Taunton, the county town of Somerset, England. It operated a fleet of six narrow gauge tramcars on a single route of 1.66 miles (2.67 km) between 1901 and 1921 when the tramway closed due to a dispute over the cost of electricity.

== History ==
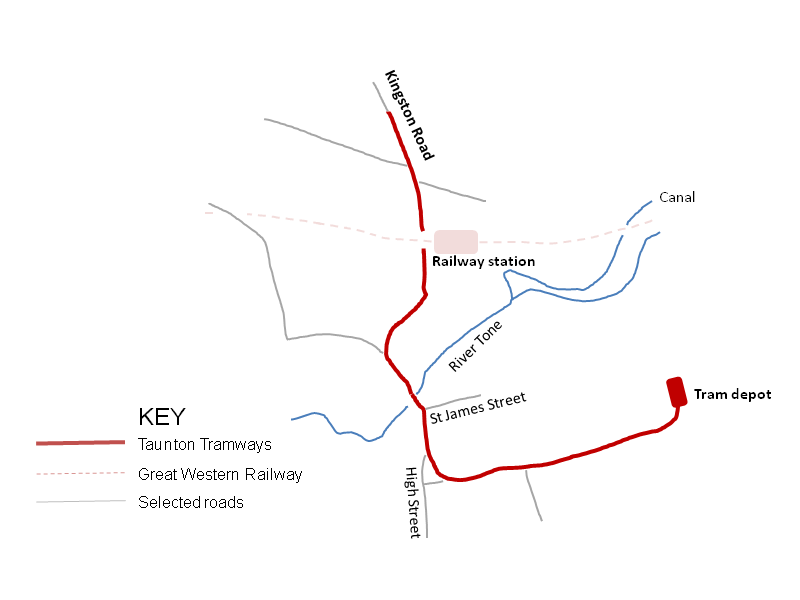
Route of the Taunton Tramway

The Taunton and West Somerset Electric Railways and Tramways Company was incorporated by the Taunton Tramways Order 1900 as a subsidiary of British Electric Traction. Despite plans to build a network to neighbouring towns including Wiveliscombe, Wellington and North Petherton it started small with a route from Taunton railway station to the town centre. This route of about 1 mile (1.6 km) opened on 2 August 1901. It became apparent that the large network proposed would not be built and so the company changed its name to the Taunton Electric Traction Company in 1903.

In 1905, the whole line was closed for eight weeks to rebuild the track which was subsiding. At the same time the entire fleet of double-deck trams were replaced by single-deck trams. On 13 August 1909, a short extension was opened, continuing under the low bridge beneath the railway station to Rowbarton. This took the line to 1.66 miles (2.67 km), its maximum extent.

The company was notified that the price of electricity would rise. The company refused to pay this so a court order was taken out against them to nullify the agreement to supply them with power. The company offered to sell the tramway to the town but this was refused. Instead the electricity was cut off on 28 May 1921. Later that year car number 1 was towed around the town by a steam locomotive while carrying a sign that read 'Yes! We have no tram cars' as part of the town's annual carnival.

== Services ==
The route ran from the depot in East Reach westwards to East Street then northwards past the Market House into North Street. After passing over the Town Bridge the line continued along Bridge Street and Station Road to the original terminus outside the railway station. After 1909 it continued up Kingston Road to terminate by the end of Salisbury Street.

When the line opened in 1901 it operated trams at least every eight minutes.

== Engineering ==
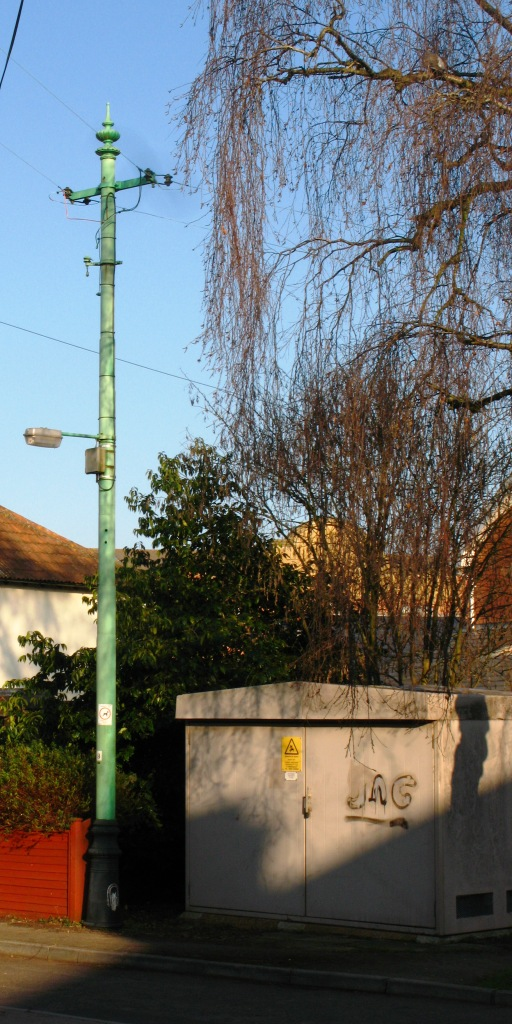
An old tram standard that was reused as a lampost in Greenway Crescent

The track was laid to 3 ft 6 in (1,067 mm) gauge. The tightest curve was 35 feet (10.67 m) and steepest gradient 1 in 25 (4%).

Electricity was supplied by Taunton Corporation from a generating station in St James Street. Ten of the cast iron standards that used to carry the overhead line have survived as lamp posts, although none of them are in their original locations. Nine could be found for many years in Greenway Crescent, not far from the Kingston Road terminus, the tenth is in West Street, Bishops Lydeard. The last tram poles have now been placed in store for possible re-erection in the town centre.

== Tram cars ==
There were six tramcars in Taunton at any time, however a total of twelve different cars operated in the town as the entire fleet was changed from double-deck to single-deck cars in 1905. Livery was dark crimson lake with gold lining. Double-deck cars had green curtains.

The open-top double-deck cars were built by Brush Electrical Engineering and had seats for 22 people downstairs and 29 upstairs. In 1905 they were sold to the Leamington and Warwick Electrical Company. One was later sold on to the Llandudno and Colwyn Bay Electric Railway where it was used as a works car until 1935. It was last seen by John Price in 1956.

The replacement single-deck cars were also built by Brush. In 1921 five were sold for further use: three went to the Torquay Tramways and two were converted to standard gauge (4 ft 8 1/2 in (1,435 mm)) for the Gravesend and Northfleet Electric Tramways. Despite many rumours over the years confirmation that the body of the last tram becoming a garden shed have still to be substantiated.

Numbers	In service	Type	Seats	Truck	Later numbering
1–6	1901–1905	Double deck	51	Brush A1	Leamington and Warwick 7–12
1–6	1905–1921	Single deck	24	Brush A1	Gravesend 7–8; Torquay 34–36

== Depot ==
The depot was at the eastern end of the network off East Reach, behind the houses in Alfred Street (51.0172°N 3.0883°W). A shed covered three tracks, and a house was provided for the manager on East Reach to the west of the depot entrance. The site has since been obliterated by the construction of Chritchard Way.

== Bibliography ==
- Oppitz, Leslie (1990). Tramways Remembered: West and South West England. Newbury: Countryside Books. ISBN 978-1853060953.
- Perkin, J.B. (1994). Exeter and Taunton Tramways. Tramway Classics. Midhurst: Middleton Press. ISBN 1-873793-32-4.
- Taunton Tramways 1901-1921 (leaflet), Taunton Deane Borough Council, 1999
- Taunton Tramways Fleet List, Published by Peter Davey and written by John Perkin. No ISBN.
