= Seaton railway station =

Seaton railway station may refer to:

In England:

- Seaton railway station (Cornwall), on the proposed St Germans & Looe Railway, which was unbuilt
- Seaton railway station (Cumbria), on the Cleator and Workington Junction Railway
- Seaton railway station (Devon)
  - Seaton tram station, Tramway operating on the old branch line
- Seaton railway station (County Durham), on the North Eastern Railway
- Seaton Carew railway station, on the Durham Coast Line
- Seaton Delaval railway station, also on the North Eastern Railway
- Seaton railway station (Rutland)
- Seaton Junction railway station
- Seaton Sluice railway station
- North Seaton railway station

In Australia:

- Seaton Park railway station in Adelaide, South Australia
