= Colyford railway station =

Railway station and tram stop in Devon, England

Colyford
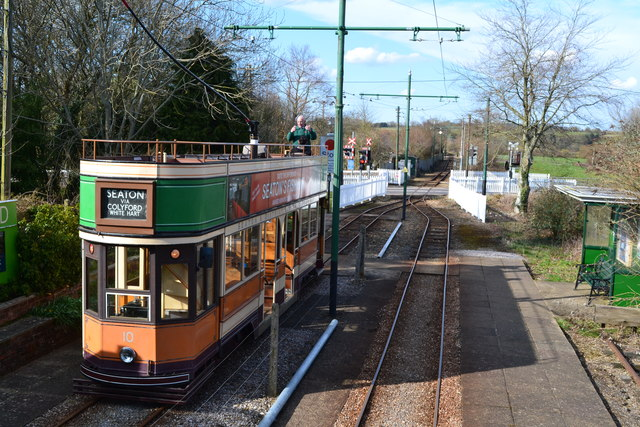
- Looking north at Colyford tram stop, with tram 10 and the level crossing beyond

General information
- Location: Colyford, East Devon; England
- Coordinates: 50.7289°N 3.0579°W
- Operated by: Seaton Tramway
- Platforms: 2

Other information
- Status: Open (as tram stop)

History
- Original company: Seaton and Beer Railway
- Pre-grouping: London and South Western Railway
- Post-grouping: Southern Railway

Key dates
- 16 March 1868: Opened as railway station
- 7 March 1966: Closed as railway station
- 1971: Reopened as tram stop

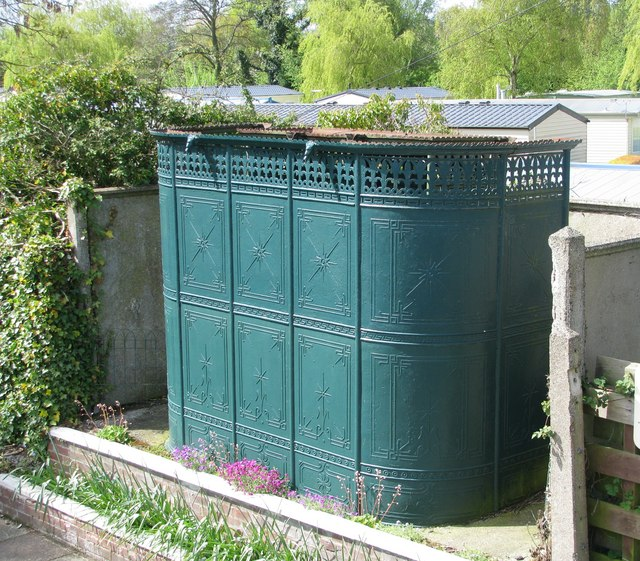
This urinal is the only building remaining from the original station.

Colyford railway station, and its successor the Colyford tram stop, serve the village of Colyford in Devon, England. It was open as a railway station, on the Seaton branch line, between 1868 and 1966, and has been open as a tram stop, on the Seaton Tramway, since 1971. It is located on the eastern side of the village of Colyford, adjacent to the White Hart Inn, where the line crosses the A3052 road on a level crossing.

== History ==
The Seaton and Beer Railway was authorised on 13 July 1863 for a line from a junction with the London and South Western Railway (L&SWR), at the station that was then known as Colyton for Seaton (but which later became Seaton Junction), to Seaton. The line was opened on 16 March 1868, together with its three stations including that at Colyford. The Seaton & Beer Railway was taken over by the L&SWR in 1885, and the L&SWR was incorporated into the Southern Railway with the Railway Grouping of 1923. The line and station became part of British Rail in 1948, but closed on 7 March 1966.

Preceding station	Disused railways	Following station
Colyton; Line and station closed	British Rail; Southern Region; Seaton Branch Line	Seaton (Devon); Line and station closed

Meanwhile, Claude Lane, and his company Modern Electric Tramways, had been operating a 2 ft (610 mm) gauge tramway in the town of Eastbourne since 1953, but by the mid-1960s the growth of the town's road system began to threaten the tramway and Claude Lane began to look for a new site. He made approaches to the British Rail Board, and the line between Colyton station and a point to the north of Seaton station was transferred in 1969. Tramway services started, using a wider gauge of 2 ft 9 in (838 mm), on the southern section of the line in 1970, and reached Colyford in the following year. Colyford remained the northern terminus of the line until 1980, when the line was extended to Colyton, making Colyford an intermediate stop.

== Operation ==
The tram stop has a passing loop, with surfaced low-level platforms on either side, together with a siding sometimes used by the line's works cars. There is a waiting shelter on the southbound platform. The railway station's original gentlemen's lavatory is still in its original position, but is no longer in use. None of the other buildings of the railway station survive, although remnants of the original high platforms remain in places.

The line operates a daily service between Easter and the end of October. Services operate every 20 minutes between April and September, and every 30 minutes outside that period. All services stop at Colyford in both directions.
