= Seaton tram station =

Tramway terminal station in the town of Seaton in the English county of Devon

Seaton
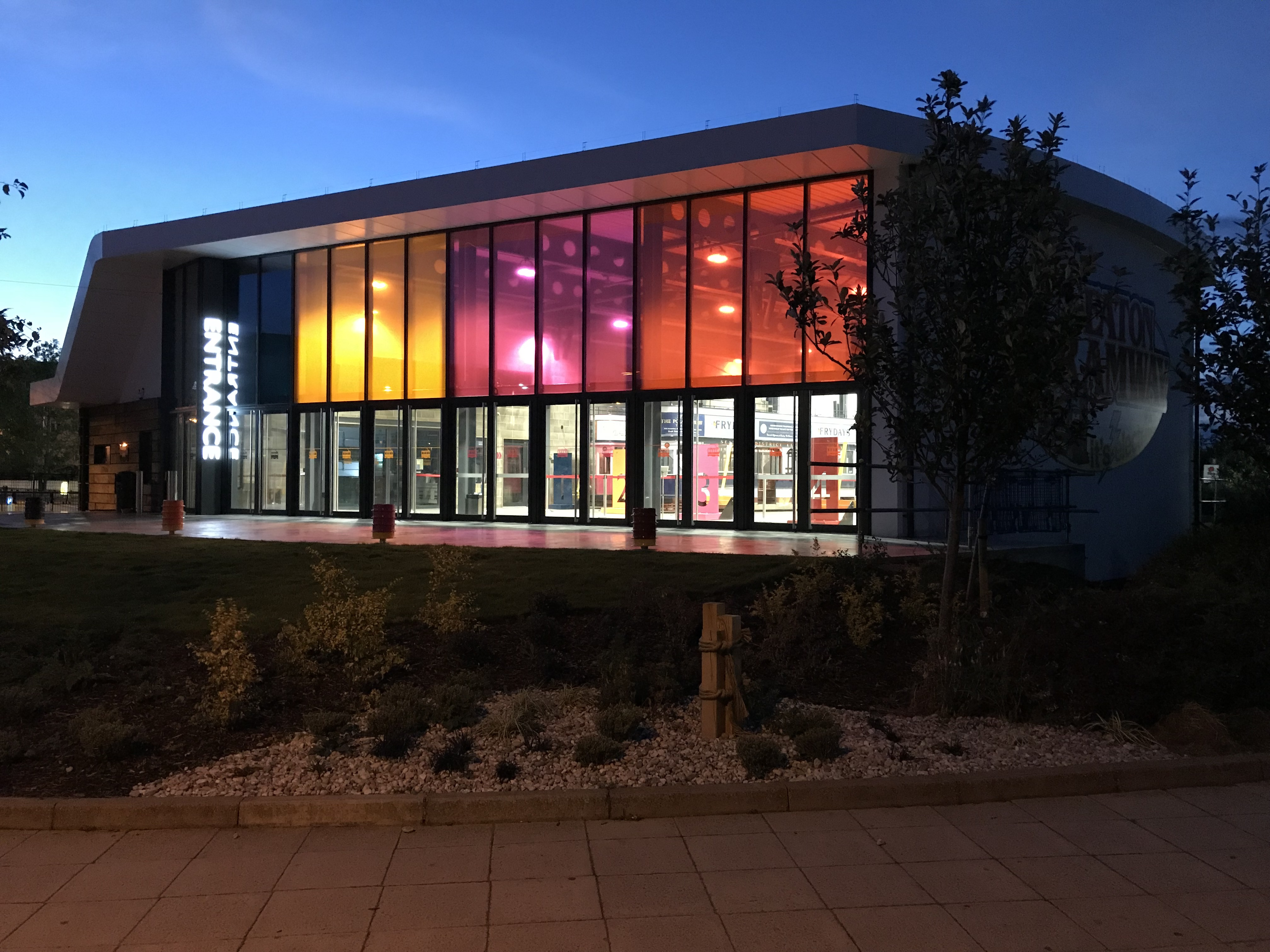
- The frontage of the latest Seaton tram station

General information
- Location: Seaton, East Devon; England
- Coordinates: 50°42′18″N 3°04′04″W
- Operated by: Seaton Tramway
- Platforms: 4

Other information
- Status: Open

Key dates
- 1975: Opened
- 1995: First station building opened
- 2018: New station building opened
Location

The Seaton tramway station is the southern terminus of the Seaton Tramway. The station is situated in the town centre of the town of Seaton in the English county of Devon. The terminus at Seaton opened in 1975, and has since been entirely rebuilt twice. The most recent rebuilding has resulted in the construction of a modern enclosed building suitable for operation all-year round, and which acts as a venue for a range of tramway and community based events.

== History ==
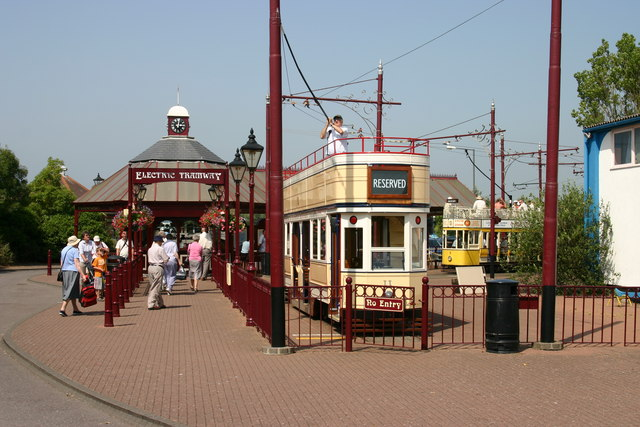
The former, Edwardian-inspired, terminus in 2006

In 1969, Claude Lane, and his company Modern Electric Tramways, acquired the track bed of a section of the former Seaton railway branch between Colyton railway station and a point north of Seaton railway station. The railway branch had closed on 7 March 1966 and his intention was to transfer his 2 ft (610 mm) gauge tramway from the town of Eastbourne, where it was threatened by changes to the road system, to Seaton. Tramway services started, using a wider gauge of 2 ft 9 in (838 mm), on the southern section of the branch line in 1970, but the southern terminus, at what is now known as Riverside tram stop, was not convenient for Seaton, so plans were made to extend the line, on a new right of way, to the centre of Seaton.

By 1975 a new extension has been constructed, diverging from the former railway branch to the north of the line's depot and interim southern terminus, and running west between the holiday camps, that then occupied the land between the town centre and former railway station, and the marshes inland from the town. The line then turned south to a terminus in the Harbour Road Car Park near the seafront and town centre. The initial layout included no shelter for passengers, with shop and ticket office facilities provided by tram shop car 01, which was towed down and back from the depot each day by the first and last service trams.

It was not until 1995 that the first permanent building was constructed, which was an Edwardian-inspired steel-and-glass shelter with gazebo-style shop and ticket office, with a revised blocked paved track layout laid at the same time.

After the closure of the adjacent holiday camps in the early 2000s, that site and part of the Harbour Road Car Park were earmarked for extensive redevelopment, with the construction of a Tesco store, Premier Inn hotel, and a large private housing development. Meanwhile, the brand new Seaton Jurassic Centre was built on part of the Harbour Road Car Park. Both projects involved raising the level of the land and left the Tramway terminus looking out of place, so the Tramway decided to build a contemporary building in order to complement the rest of the regeneration area.

== The new station ==
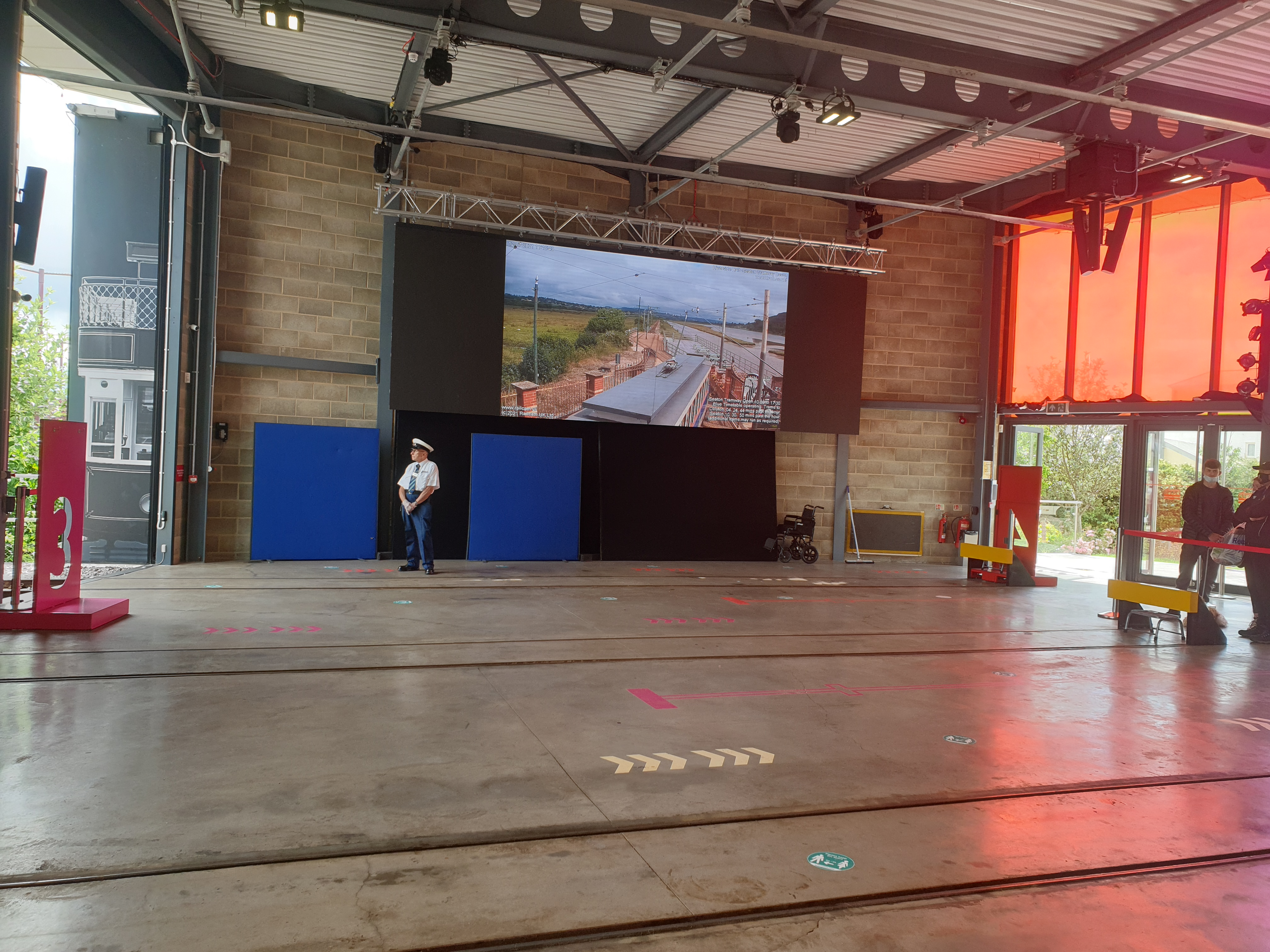
Interior of new tram station, showing its multipurpose nature and webcam feed

The new station was designed by Ray Hole Architects, who were also responsible for the new summit station of the Snowdon Mountain Railway, and the design involved lifting the station some 2 metres (6 ft 7 in) above the surrounding land. Construction started in September 2017 and the new station opened on 28 June 2018. During the construction period, Riverside tram stop again operated as the southern terminus of the line and a shuttle bus service was provided between there and the Seaton station site.

The new station is a modern, fully enclosed building with a footprint of 460 square metres (5,000 sq ft). It contains a main hall containing a four track terminal layout, as well as a small cafe and shop, toilets, and staff facilities. The new station has been designed with a flush floor throughout, thus enabling the space to also be used for events and exhibitions. One wall accommodates a large screen that can be used for a variety of purposes; during normal operation it displays a live webcam feed from the tramway depot looking down the line and estuary towards Colyford.

The station is fronted by a landscaped pedestrian area, which extends as far as Harbour Road and also provides access to the adjacent Tesco Store and Seaton Jurassic Centre. A bus and coach park lies to one side of the pedestrian area. Because of its raised height and open aspect, the station is highly visible within the town of Seaton.

In 2019, the station won an "Outstanding Achievement" award from the Heritage Railway Association and the "Welcome Accolade" from Visit England.

== Operation ==
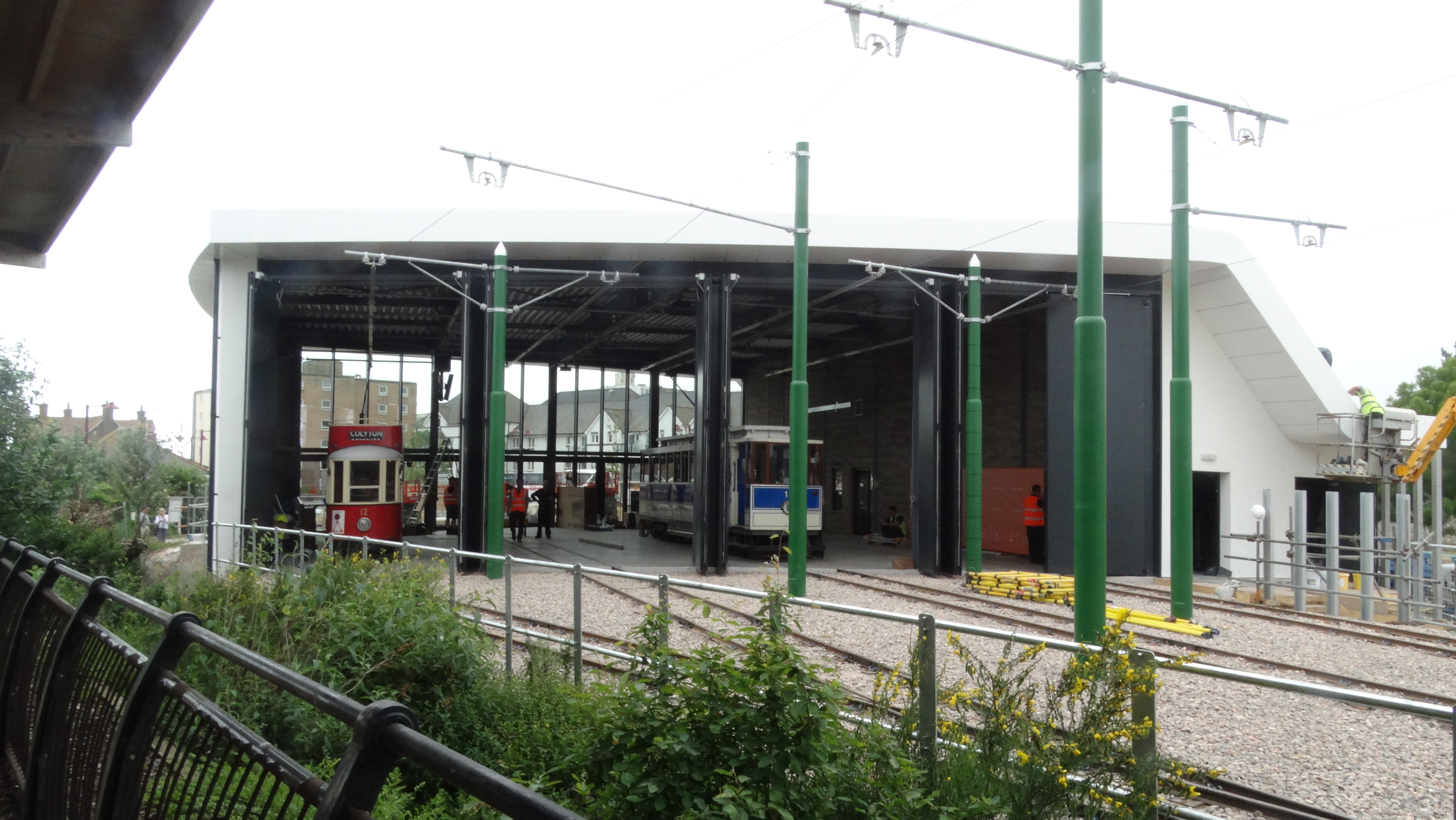
The new tram station seen from the line side, showing the four terminal tracks

Arriving trams terminate in, and departing trams leave from, one of the four terminal tracks in the station building, each of which is capable of accommodating a single tram car, although Road 1 is paved to allow loading outside the main station building by extra trams where needed. The four tracks converge into a single track north of the station.

The line operates a daily service between Easter and the end of October, plus school holidays and weekends after February half-term. Services operate every 20 minutes throughout the year. In normal operation, trams pass at Riverside, 4 minutes north of Seaton, meaning that a tram will arrive and depart without another tram entering the station. On occasion, trams are stored in the station when not in use, normally on roads 1 and/or 4, although all 4 roads are regularly used during the busy summer period.
