= Colyton railway station =

Railway station in Devon, England (1868–1966)

Colyton
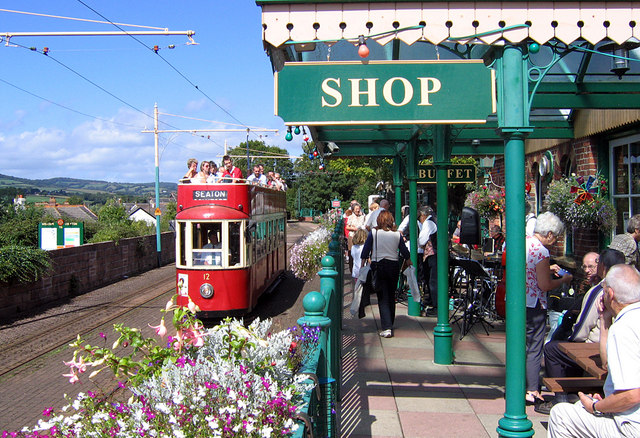
- Colyton tram station seen from the platform of the old railway station

General information
- Location: Colyton, East Devon; England
- Coordinates: 50.7414°N 3.0621°W
- Operated by: Seaton Tramway
- Platforms: 1

Other information
- Status: Open (as tram stop)

History
- Original company: Seaton and Beer Railway
- Pre-grouping: London and South Western Railway
- Post-grouping: Southern Railway

Key dates
- 16 March 1868: Opened as railway station
- 7 March 1966: Closed as railway station
- 1980: Reopened as tram stop

Colyton railway station, and its successor the Colyton tram stop, serve the town of Colyton in Devon, England. It was open as a railway station, on the Seaton branch line, between 1868 and 1966, and has been open as a tram stop, on the Seaton Tramway, since 1980. The station is situated some 0.5 miles (0.80 km) to the east of Colyton town centre.

== History ==
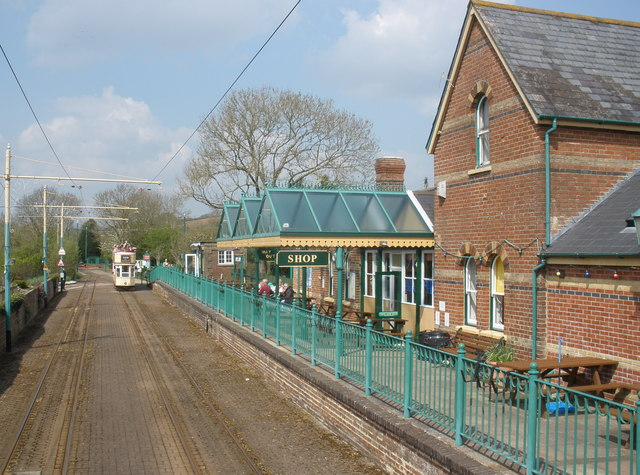
The old platform and station buildings looking north, with tram track occupying the railway track bed

The Seaton and Beer Railway was authorised on 13 July 1863 for a line from a junction with the London and South Western Railway (L&SWR), at the station that was then known as Colyton for Seaton (but which later became Seaton Junction), to Seaton. The line was opened on 16 March 1868, together with its three stations including that at Colyton. The Seaton & Beer Railway was taken over by the L&SWR in 1885, and the L&SWR was incorporated into the Southern Railway with the Railway Grouping of 1923. The line and station became part of British Rail in 1948, but closed on 7 March 1966.

Preceding station	Disused railways	Following station
Seaton Junction; Line and station closed	British Rail; Southern Region; Seaton Branch Line	Colyford; Line and station closed

Meanwhile, Claude Lane, and his company Modern Electric Tramways, had been operating a 2 ft (610 mm) gauge tramway in the town of Eastbourne since 1953, but by the mid-1960s the growth of the town's road system began to threaten the tramway and Claude Lane began to look for a new site. He made approaches to the British Rail Board, and the line between Colyton and a point to the north of Seaton station was transferred in 1969. Tramway services started, using a wider gauge of 2 ft 9 in (838 mm), on the southern section of the line in 1970, but did not reach Colyton until 1980, when the line was extended from Colyford. It has served as the northern terminus of the line ever since.

The former railway station building was acquired by the Tramway as part of the purchase of the line, but with the agreement that the Station Manager and his family would continue to live in the house for the duration of his retirement. The building became available for Tramway use in 1985, when the building was converted into shop and refreshment facilities. The station has undergone two major upgrades since; in 1996, the shop was extended over part of the station house garden, and the house itself was converted to larger restaurant, kitchen and stores facilities. A new toilet block was built towards the south end of the platform, railings were installed along the length of the platform edge and the track bed was block paved in order to create a street tramway atmosphere. In 2013, another extension was added to the rear of the building to create the Garden Room, which provides additional restaurant seating.

The former station goods yard was initially bought by a local builder, and further small industrial units were constructed in the 1970s and 80s. However, in 2011 the Tramway acquired the former goods shed and coal office buildings, along with a significant portion of land which is currently used as visitor car parking. The goods shed building is currently in use as an antique shop known as the Vintage Shed.

== Operation ==
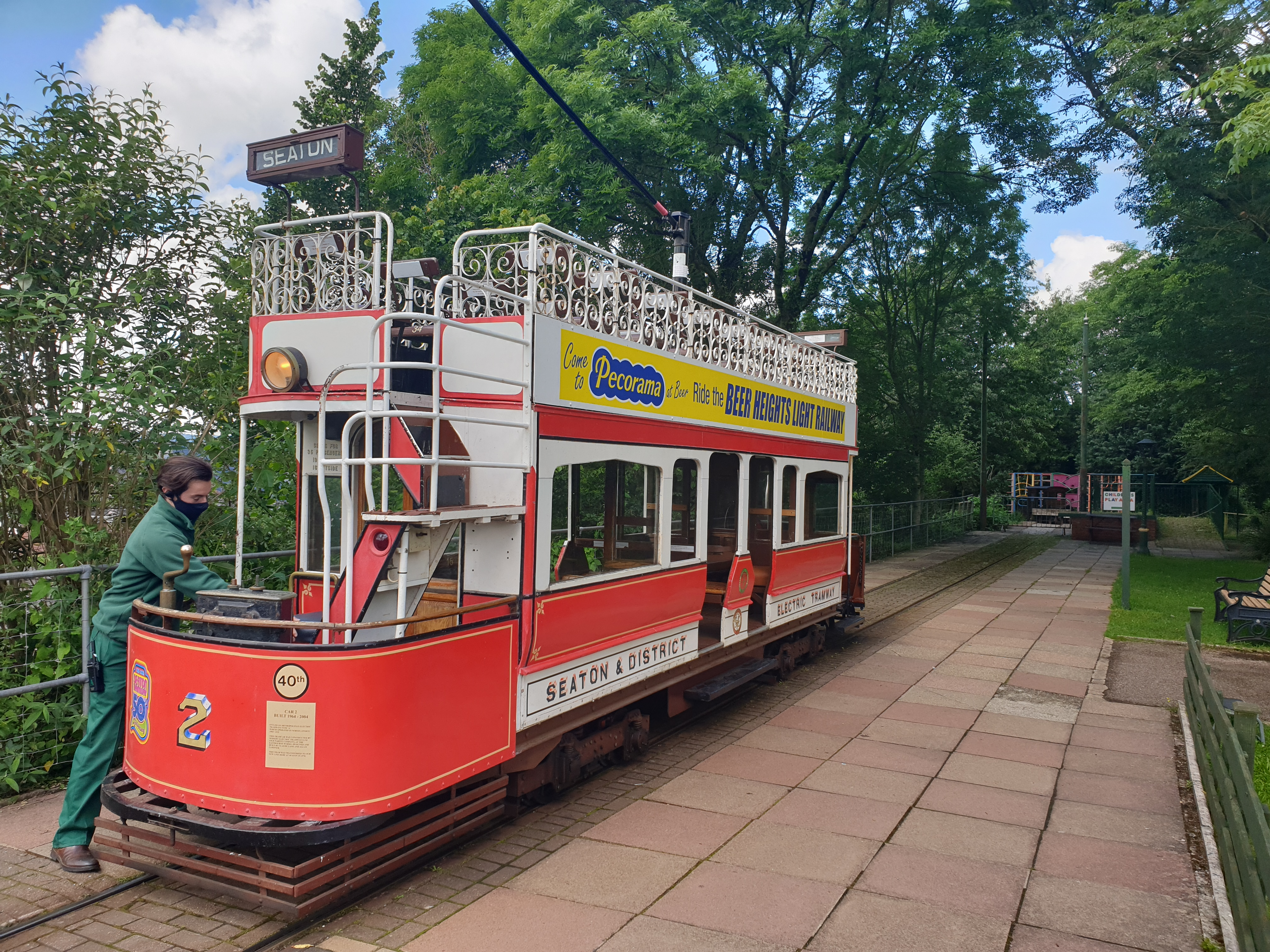
The end of the line, with car 2 in the headshunt after discharging its passengers

The original high platform and station buildings still exist, with the buildings housing the Tram Stop Restaurant, a shop and toilets, whilst the platform provides access to the buildings and outdoor tables for the restaurant. There is also a children's play area at the northern end of the track.

The former track bed of the station now houses twin tram tracks which are set in block paving. At the northern end of the station the twin tracks converge into the arrivals headshunt, where arriving passengers disembark onto a low level platform. There is a single siding at the northern end of the station, accessed from the headshunt. Prior to the 2020 covid pandemic, departing passengers boarded trams at the northern end of the former platform, but during the pandemic the boarding point was relocated to the southern end of that platform in order to improve social distancing.

The line operates a daily service between Easter and the end of October. Services operate every 20 minutes between April and September, and every 30 minutes outside that period.

== Bibliography ==
- Butt, R.V.J. (1995). The Directory of Railway Stations. Yeovil: Patrick Stephens Ltd. ISBN 1-85260-508-1. R508.
- Williams, R.A. (1973). The London & South Western Railway, volume 2: Growth and Consolidation. Newton Abbot: David & Charles. ISBN 0-7153-5940-1.
