= Seaton railway station (Devon) =

Former railway station in Devon, UK

Seaton

General information
- Location: Seaton, East Devon; England
- Coordinates: 50.7053°N 3.0613°W
- Grid reference: SY251900
- Platforms: 2

Other information
- Status: Disused

History
- Original company: Seaton and Beer Railway
- Pre-grouping: London and South Western Railway
- Post-grouping: Southern Railway

Key dates
- 16 March 1868: Opened as Seaton and Beer
- ?: Renamed Seaton
- 7 March 1966: Closed
Location

Seaton railway station served the holiday resort of Seaton in Devon, England between 1868 and 1966. It was the terminus of a branch line from Seaton Junction. The station was about half a mile east of the centre of Seaton, on the western side of the estuary of the River Axe. Originally named Seaton and Beer, it was renamed Seaton by the LSWR.

== History ==
The Seaton and Beer Railway was authorised on 13 July 1863 for a line from a junction with the London and South Western Railway (L&SWR), at the station that was then known as Colyton for Seaton (but which later became Seaton Junction), to Seaton. After some delays, the line was completed in 1867; it was inspected by Colonel Yolland of the Board of Trade on 27 December 1867, but he found various problems and refused to sanction the opening. After the issues had been addressed, the line was opened on 16 March 1868, together with its three stations including that at Seaton.

The Seaton and Beer Railway was taken over by the L&SWR in 1885, and the L&SWR was incorporated into the Southern Railway with the Railway Grouping of 1923. At its peak Seaton was provided with through coaches to and from London Waterloo, which coupled to and uncoupled from London trains at Seaton Junction.

The station closed on 7 March 1966. Although much of the branch line was subsequently repurposed as the route of the Seaton Tramway this does not include the site of Seaton station, as the tramway turns off the branch right of way to the north and takes a different route to its terminus in central Seaton. The tramway's depot is located at the extreme north of the station site, in the area formerly occupied by the signal box.

Preceding station	Disused railways	Following station
Colyford; Line and station closed	British Rail; Southern Region; Seaton Branch Line	Terminus

== Bibliography ==
- Butt, R.V.J. (1995). The Directory of Railway Stations. Yeovil: Patrick Stephens Ltd. ISBN 1-85260-508-1. R508.
- Williams, R.A. (1973). The London & South Western Railway, volume 2: Growth and Consolidation. Newton Abbot: David & Charles. ISBN 0-7153-5940-1.
