= Tramways in Exeter =

Tram networks in Exeter, South West England

Exeter
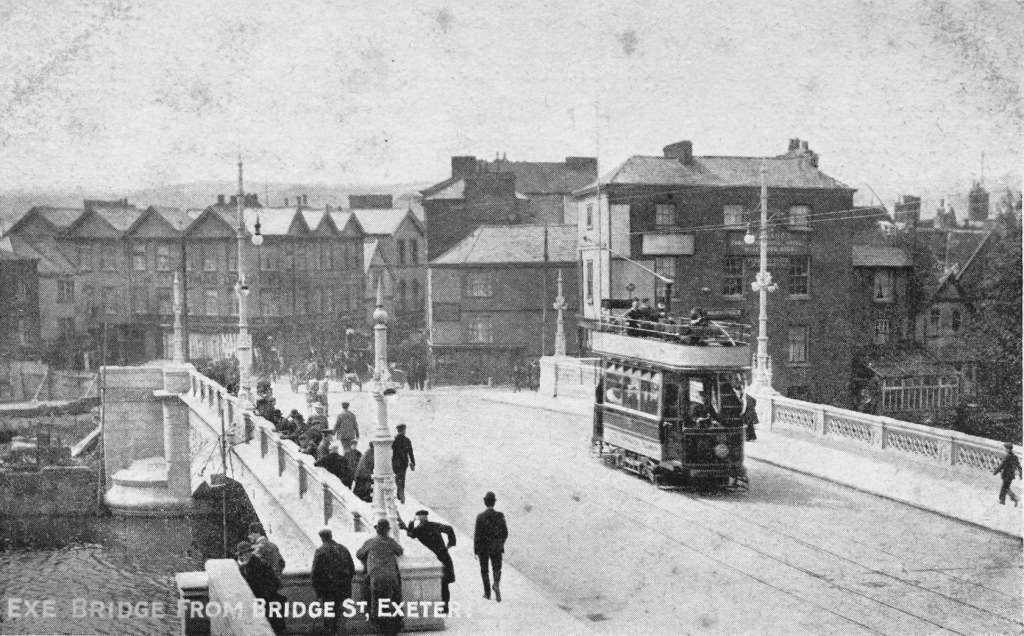
- An electric tram crossing the Exe Bridge

Operation
- Locale: Exeter
- Open: 6 April 1882
- Close: 19 August 1931
- Status: Closed

Infrastructure
- Track gauge: 3 ft 6 in (1,067 mm)
- Propulsion systems: Horse, electric
- Electrification: 500–550 V DC overhead line

Statistics
- Route length: 4.95 miles (7.97 km)

Tramways in Exeter were operated between 1882 and 1931. The first horse-drawn trams were operated by the Exeter Tramway Company but in 1904 the Exeter Corporation took over, closing the old network and replacing it with a new one powered by electricity. A bus service replaced the tram system in 1931.

== History ==
=== Horse era ===
Exeter Tramways Act 1881
- Act of Parliament
- Parliament of the United Kingdom
- Long title: An Act for making Tramways in the county of Devon, to be called "The Exeter Tramways"; and for other purposes.
- Citation: 44 & 45 Vict. c. cxxx

Dates
- Royal assent: 18 July 1881

Other legislation
- Repealed by: Exeter City Council Act 1987

Status: Repealed

Text of statute as originally enacted

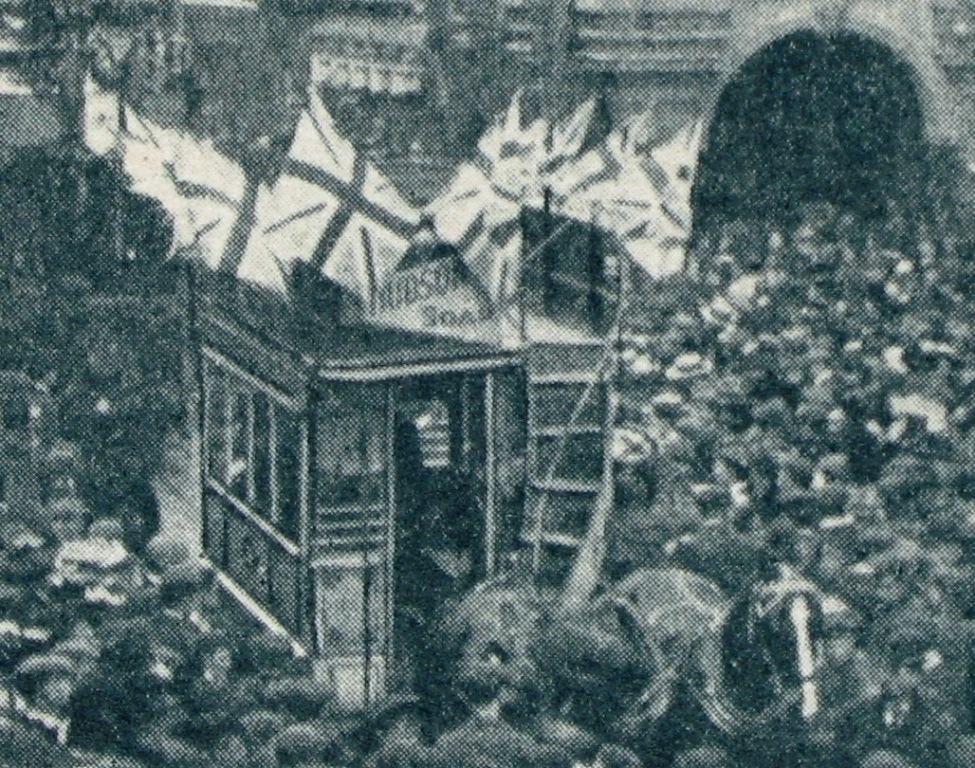
The last horse tram was paraded through the streets at the inauguration of the electric services in 1905

An act of Parliament was made in 1881 "for making tramways in the county of Devon to be called Exeter Tramways"; the Exeter Tramways Act 1881 (44 & 45 Vict. c. cxxx). Under this the council gave 21 years of running powers over Exeter's streets. The rights were assigned to a commercial company, the Exeter Tramway Company. This company was launched in 1881 when its prospectus was published in The Times. The directors were William Leigh Bernard, W. Standing, and W. M. Wood. The manager and inspector was S. H. Culley and the secretary was J. Lord. The Exeter Tramway Company was formed at a meeting at the Black Horse Inn on Longbrook Street on 15 November 1881. Construction of the tramway began on 3 January 1882 and it started horse-drawn tramway services in Exeter on 6 April 1882.

Although the routes along Sidwell Street and Heavitree Road proved to be popular, the company's failure to get permission for a line along Queen Street and High Street in the heart of the town made it difficult for the company to make a large operating surplus. This meant they were unable to expand the system or even keep the trams well maintained. As early as 1883 the company had difficulty in paying its mortgage and other debts. The company continued to have financial difficulties and faced liquidation in 1888. The company was subject to a compulsory winding-up order dated 10 March 1888 and attempts by the Liquidator to find a buyer were unsuccessful. The company was dissolved by the High Court on 7 August 1889. In 1892 it was taken over by the Tramway Purchase Syndicate and leased to Frederick Burt and Company. However, even under the new ownership, problems were ongoing. In 1893 Sunday services were suspended through the spring, and the route up the steep hill from Exeter St David's into town was abandoned.

By the start of the 20th century, the 21 year life of the act which set up the system was coming to its end and the corporation had a right to purchase the business. The Exeter Corporation Act 1903 (3 Edw. 7. c. clxxxii) was passed in Parliament which gave the corporation the right to buy out the Exeter Tramway Company and construct a new system. The company and stock of the tramway was purchased by Exeter Corporation on 1 February 1904 for £6,749. Exeter Corporation Tramways built a new system of electric trams. The last horse-drawn tram ran on 4 April 1905. Going in front of the first electric tram service it travelled from the Guildhall and then along the High Street, down New North Road, to the tram shed and into retirement.

=== Electric era ===
From 1882 the Exeter Tramway Company had been operating a horse-drawn tramway service. The authority to run this service had been granted under a 21-year act, and so by 1900 the act was coming up for renewal. Two private companies approached the city council to seek permission to replace the horse trams with electric trams. However, the city council decided to investigate the possibility of running the trams services themselves. Members of the Tramways Committee went to visit other tram systems, including ones in London, Birmingham, Southampton and even going to France to visit systems in Paris, Rouen and Le Havre. The report prepared by the city surveyor and its electrical engineer supported the adoption of an overhead trolley system.

In December 1902 a poll of residents was taken on two questions – whether to present a parliamentary bill for the right to run the trams and whether the trams should run along the High Street. The first questions was approved with a 79% majority and the second with a majority of 75%. The previous horse tram system had been refused permission to run along the High Street. This was despite opposition from some local business leaders such as Charles Josiah Ross (owner of a local draper and outfitters shop) and other firms such as Hinton Lake the chemists and W. R. Lisle, jewellers.

The Exeter Corporation Act 1903 (3 Edw. 7. c. clxxxii) was passed in Parliament for the right to buy out the Exeter Tramways Company and for the city to build and run a new system. The cost of setting up the electric tramways was £65,200. The cost included £6,800 to buy out the previous company and all the track, stock and horses. Construction of the tramways involved considerable disruption to the High Street with the road being dug up and a number of properties being demolished to make way for the trams. This led to St Petrocks Church being on the street frontage (having previously been hidden) and the demolition of its porch.

The first test of the new electric trams took place on 24 March 1905 from the new depot at the end of Paris Street. The tram had just set off towards Livery Dole when all its lights went out. Fortunately this was found to simply be a minor problem with the engagement of the trolley arm and The Board of Trade Inspector approved the system.

The official opening was on 4 April 1905 at 12.30. Five trams were lined up outside the Guildhall, including the only horse tram ever to travel down the High Street. The first electric tram was driven by the mayor who was presented with a silver tram handle. Once the tram had travelled to Livery Dole and back, the mayor gave a speech from the top deck of the first tram. By June 1905 the trams were already carrying 80,000 passengers per week. Special fares for workers were offered with cheaper fares for early morning and early evening travel.

The first services only operated from the Guildhall to Mount Pleasant Inn and from St David's to Livery Dole. By September 1906 however, the route crossing the bridge across the River Exe opened with a line out to Stone Lane in Alphington.

There was considerable debate about whether to carrying advertising on the trams. Adverts on tickets was introduced from start but many members of council felt that it was not appropriate for a corporation owned service. It was only in 1920 that advertising was carried routinely on the trams.

Although the trams continued to run during World War I, they faced severe difficulties. Almost 80% of the staff were involved with war service of some sort with 60% going to war overseas. Women were employed as conductresses but being a motorman (driver) was still seen as a man's job. Due to lack of trained staff, the trams often did not run the full length of the line, leaving passengers to walk to their destinations. The frequency of the trams was reduced in January 1918 from one every eight minutes to one every nine minutes but the trams were still often late and overcrowded. Maintenance also became an issue both from lack of materials and money to pay for them. This lack of maintenance may have contributed to the only fatal accident that ever occurred on the trams. On 6 March 1917 a tramcar got out of control on Fore Street Hill. It collided with a lorry belonging to the London and South Western Railway. A Mrs. Mary Findlay was killed when the car left the rails and overturned.

=== Closure ===
By the late 1920s, traffic in the centre of Exeter was becoming an increasing problem – especially during the summer. The High Street was a major bottleneck as almost all the through traffic had to pass along it. All vehicles coming from Bath or Honiton and going towards Plymouth, Torquay or Okehampton had to go through the centre of town and across the Exe Bridge. Between 1920 and 1930 the number of motor vehicles travelling along the High Street each day increased from 1,314 to 5,901. Although some bypass road were built such as Prince of Wales Road and the Hill Barton bypass to Countess Wear, this did little to solve the problems. Part of the problem was perceived to be due to the trams – especially so, given the narrow streets of parts of Exeter and the large proportion of the system which was single track.

The tramways committee first introduced bus services in 1928 to serve areas which the trams did not go to. These motor buses were single deckers; Maudslay, Leyland and Bristols. The Maudslay ML3 no 5 (FJ6154) of this period is now preserved. After testing several different buses they eventually chose AEC Regent and Leyland TD2 double deckers (delivered in 1931).

As the councillors could not decide whether to replace the trams completely with buses, they commissioned a report from an independent expert whose report was completed in April 1929. He found that there was a backlog of track renewals and other repairs, that the narrow streets were not suitable for trams and that at an average speed of 6.5 miles per hour (compared to 9.5 mph in London) the trams were slower than in any of 11 other cities. In council elections in November 1929, the Labour Party campaigned on a platform of keeping the trams but their vote declined. In 1930 the council finally decide to replace the trams with double-decker buses.

In January 1931 the service along Alphington Road ended and the final trams ran on 19 August 1931. The last ever tram was driven by Mr E. C. Perry who as mayor, had driven the first tram. The last tram, car 14, was followed by a double decker bus to usher in the new age. Mr E. C. Perry was presented with a silver-plated control handle and Mr Bradley, chairman of the Transport Committee was presented the reverse lever which was also silver-plated and inscribed. One of the tramcars (No. 19) survived and was restored on the Seaton Tramway but as a single deck tram.

== Routes ==
=== Horse services ===
A map of the horse – drawn tram system

The system had three main routes radiating from just outside the East gate of the city. The first trams in 1882, ran from the Bude Hotel in London Inn Square to a stop on Heavitree Road near St Luke's College and was extended to Livery Dole in May 1893. Two additional routes were introduced in 1893: one ran along New North Road, and then down St David's Hill to the Railway station; the third route went to the end of Mount Pleasant Road via Sidwell Street and Blackboy Road. However, a plan to run trams along Queen Street and High Street then on to Barnfield was prevented by the opposition of shop owners on these streets and also by residents. A planned branch along Queen Street as far the Royal Albert Memorial Museum was never built. The depot was in a shed off New North Road.

The company also ran connecting horse-drawn omnibus services which went to Alphington and Kennford, Pinhoe and Broadclyst, Topsham and to the end of Union Road.

There was a flat fare of 1d for a single journey, and 3d for a through journey which via London Inn Square.

=== Electric services ===
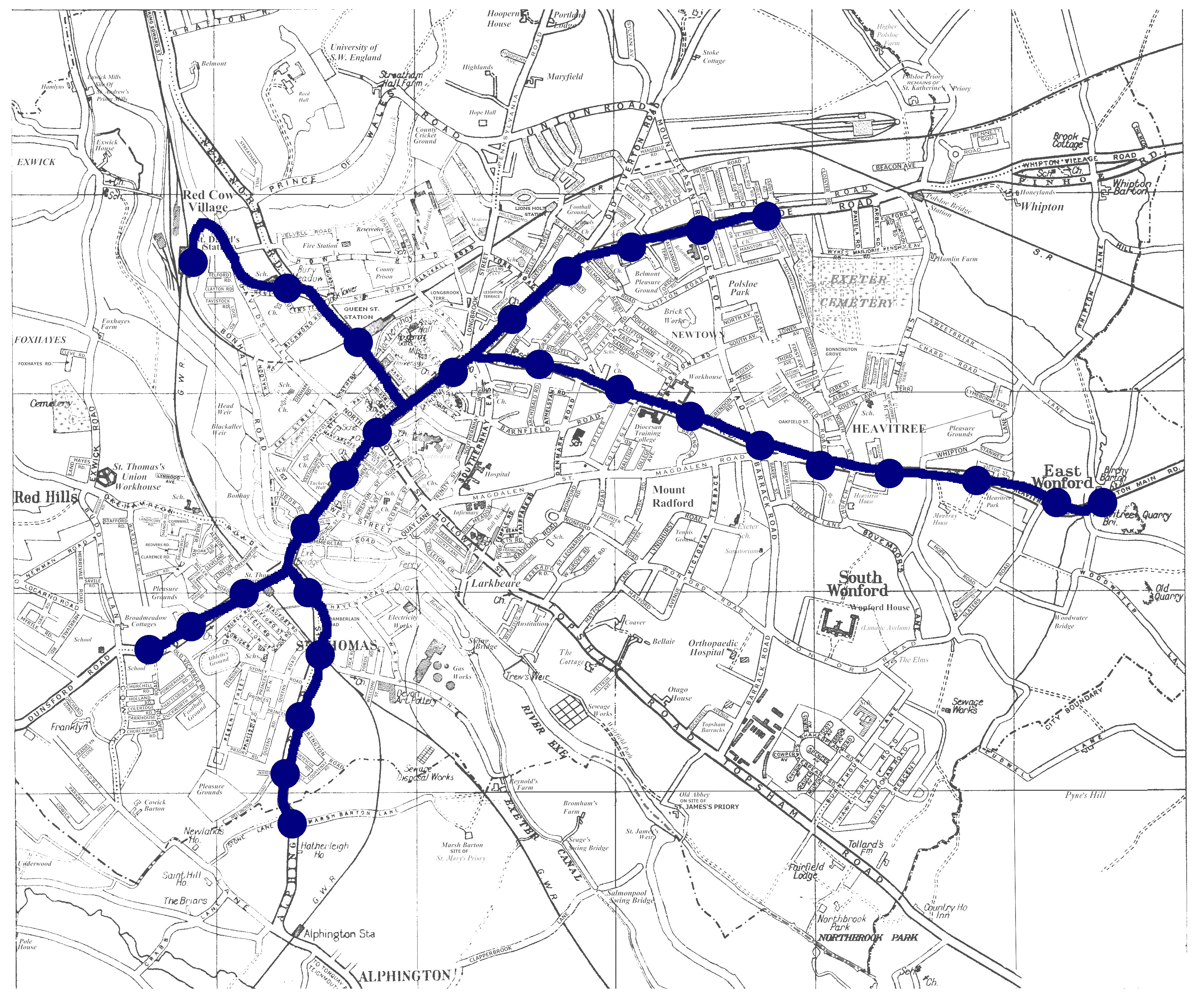
The network in 1930

The electric trams expanded considerably the routes of the former horse tram. The most significant new route was the one which ran along the High Street, over the River Exe, on the bridge completed in 1905, and then divided into two with one branch which ran along Alphington Road as far as Stone Lane, and a second branch went to the top of Cowick Street. The route down Pinhoe Road now went to Abbey Road and that along Heavitree Road was extended through Heavitree (then outside the city boundary) to Cross Park. The section of the horse tram route along New North Road was not included in the new system.

Once completed the system operated three routes:

- Cross Park Terrace (Heavitree) to Cowick Street, via Paris Street, High Street and the Exe Bridge. The symbol for this route was a white saltire cross on a red background.
- Abbey Road junction with Pinhoe Road to Stone Lane junction with Alphington Road, via Sidwell Street, High Street and the Exe Bridge. The symbol for this route was a green circle on a white background.
- Exeter St. David's Station to Pinhoe Road via Hele Road. Some trams terminated at Queen Street. The symbol for this route was a white circle on a green background.

=== Proposed extensions ===
Several further extensions were proposed but none of them were ever built. The original agreed plans included the following additional routes: down Eastgate to Southernhay; down Longbrook Street and up to Pennsylvania Road; along Bonhay from Fore Street to St David's station; along Denmark Road from Magdalen Street and one down South Street. To ensure the service remained profitable none of these were built. Later proposal for extensions included extensions of the Heavitee line and an extension from Pinhoe road to Whipton. The later proposal got approval for a loan from the Ministry of Transport but was never built.

== Tram cars ==
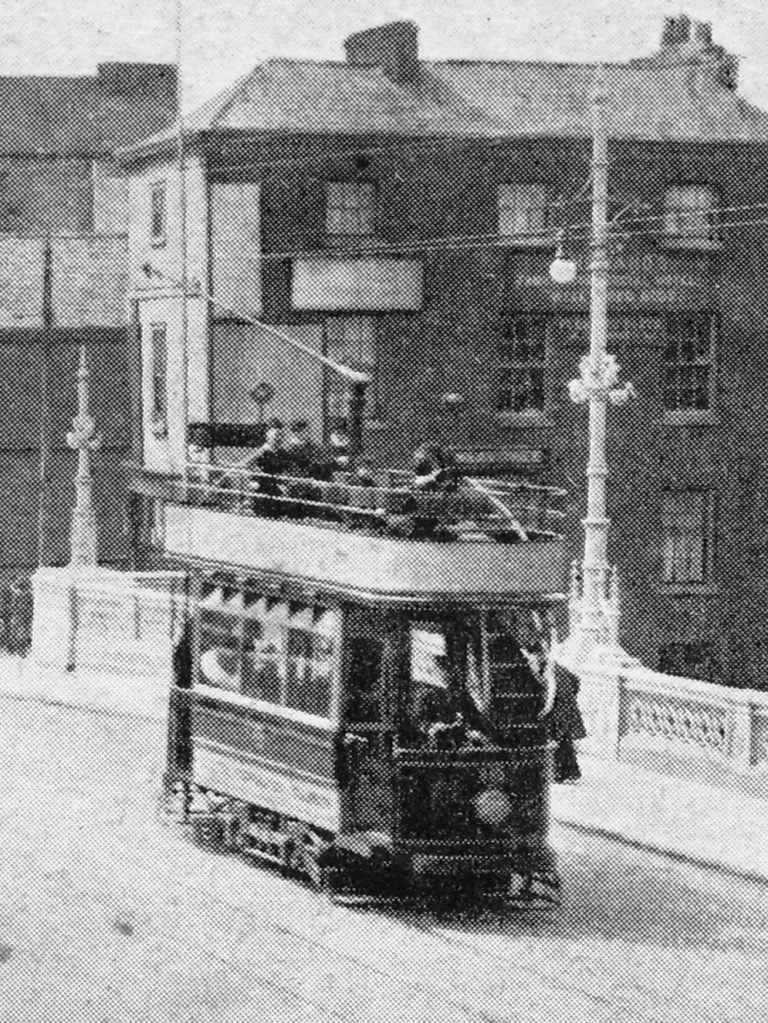
A double-deck electric car

The horse trams were built to 3 ft 6 in (1,067 mm) gauge and the first ones were single deckers. Three trams were purchased from the Bristol Wagon & Carriage Works for the opening in 1882. The trams seated sixteen passengers on the inside with four more on the rear platform. The trams were yellow with chocolate brown lettering. Three more trams were bought 1883, when the complete network was opened and then two more in 1884. Around the mid-1890s, the company bought its first double decker trams, again from the Bristol Wagon and Carriage Work Company. A minimum of six of these were purchased along with a final single decker tram in a toast-rack style. When the company was bought out, there were four remaining double decker trams and one single decker.

Each tram was pulled by a team of two horses. They would be trained by local farmers, first by pulling carts and then moving on to the trams. After they were no longer able to pull the trams, they would be sold back to the farms for lighter work. There were several convictions of tram drivers for cruelty to the horses. At the end of horse-drawn tram services, there were twenty-two horses owned by the company which were sold off by Exeter Corporation for about £15 each.

Over the whole of its existence, Exeter Corporation Tramways bought a total of 37 trams. These were numbered 1-24 (without a number 13) in the first series and 1–4 in the second series. All were open top double deck trams with four wheels. Trams 1-21 were purchased between April 1905 and August 1906 from Dick, Kerr & Co. of Preston. They had two 25 horsepower (19 kW) motors and had 42 seats, 20 on the lower and 22 on the upper deck. Nos 22–25, bought in December 1914 were the first purchased from Brush (as were all the later trams) and had two 34 horsepower (25 kW) motors and seated 44. After World War I two new cars were purchased (26 and 27). These had seats for 54 passengers. Car 27 was the first to be fitted with an enclosed cab. Nos 28-30 were bought in 1925 and were followed by the last of the first series – no 31–34 in 1926. The last trams were purchased in 1929 (1-4 of the new series) and were initially intended for the planned extension to Whipton. They had two General Electric 50 horsepower (37 kW) motors and could seat 53 people. They were delivered only months before the decision was made to bring an end to the tram services. In 1931 these four tramcars were sold to Halifax Corporation for £200 each. They ran there for a further seven years until finally being withdrawn in November 1938.

The livery of the trams was dark green and cream with gold lettering and a dark maroon under carriage.

=== Preservation ===
The body of Car 19 was acquired by Seaton Tramway in 1994, having previously been used as a summerhouse at Rewe and latterly Winkleigh. Due to the narrower gauge at Seaton (2 ft 9 in (838 mm)), it had to be restored as a single deck saloon but otherwise retains the original proportions, along with a good deal of original bodywork and other preserved features, such as the seats. It entered service in September 1998, retaining its Exeter fleet number.

== Accidents ==
On 26 September 1885 the worst accident of the horse-tram era occurred when the brakes failed while a tram was going down St David's Hill and it overturned. The horses and four passengers were injured.

There was one fatal accident on the system on 17 March 1917 after a tram ran out of control down the steep hill of Fore Street, picking up speed and eventually overturning on Exe Bridge.

== Power supplies ==
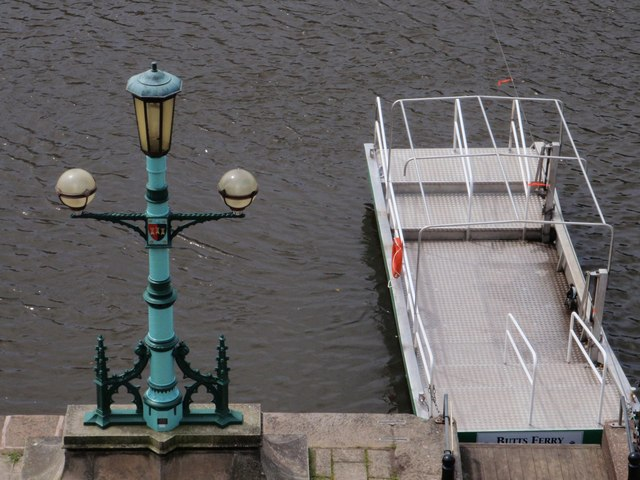
Lamp standard from the 1905 Exe Bridge which was also a traction pole. Now at Butts Ferry.

The power for the trams was provided by the newly municipalised City of Exeter Electricity Company who in 1904 had built a new power station at Haven Banks. The trams had the benefit for the company of providing a load during the daytime. The new power station was coal fired with generators made by British Westinghouse and with cabling installed in stone lined conduits by Siemens Brothers of London. It generated a total power of 1,300 kW AC output which was converted to DC at 500-550 V for the trams. The trams were supplied their power through a trolley system and most of the traction poles had side brackets, including the ones which were part of the design of the Exe Bridge built in 1905. Some of the pole were also used for street lighting and it is still possible to see some of the bases of the poles, for example among the railings on Hele Road. The system was split into sections which could be isolated and were powered independently. So that problems could be reported quickly, each of the section pillars which provided the supply also had a telephone to the power station and the depot.

== Sources ==
- Neville, Julia (2010). Exeter and the Trams 1882-1931. Exeter Civic Society. ISBN 978-0-9544343-1-1.
