= Seaton Town Hall =

Municipal building in Seaton, Devon, England

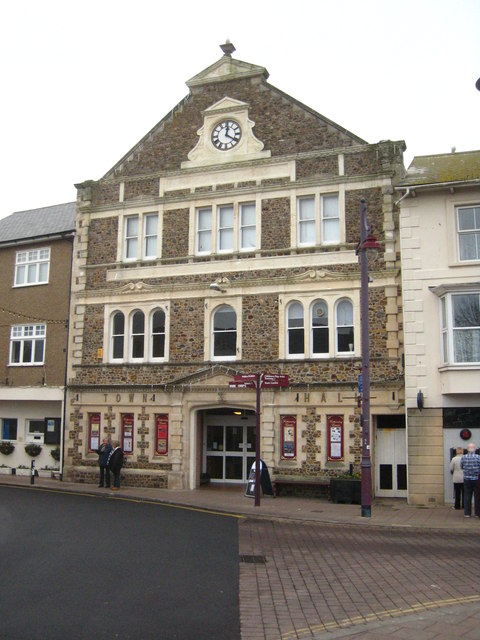
- Seaton Town Hall

- Shown in Devon
- 50.7057°N 3.0704°W
- Location: Fore Street, Seaton

History
- Built: 1904

Site notes
- Architectural style: Italianate style

Seaton Town Hall was a municipal building in Fore Street, Seaton, Devon, England. The former Town Hall, which was the meeting place of Seaton Urban District Council, currently hosts The Gateway Theatre, providing live music, theatre, cultural and community events.

== History ==
Following significant population growth, largely associated with the role of Seaton as a seaside resort, the area became an urban district in 1894. In this context, local business leaders decided to establish a specially formed company, known as the Seaton Town Hall Company, to build and finance a town hall for the new district: the site they selected was occupied by a local business, Fewing's mineral-aerated water and ginger beer factory. The new building was designed in the Italianate style, built by George Henry Richards in beer stone and chert with ashlar dressings and was opened to the public on 27 July 1904. An official opening ceremony was conducted by the local member of parliament, Sir John Kennaway, the following year.

The design involved a symmetrical main frontage with three bays facing onto Fore Street; the central bay featured a wide recessed doorway on the ground floor, a round headed window with an architrave on the first floor and three sash windows on the second floor. The outer bays were fenestrated with single windows with architraves on the ground floor, three round headed windows with architraves on the first floor and two sash windows on the second floor. There were entablatures with modillioned cornices above each of the floors and, at roof level, there was pedimented gable with a clock in the tympanum. The entablatures were inscribed with the words "Town Hall" on the ground floor, "Council Offices" on the first floor and "Masonic Hall" on the second floor reflecting the uses of each of the floors. Internally, the principal room was the main hall which was used for dances and showing silent films. The council acquired the building from the original shareholders allowing the company to be wound up in 1934.

During the Second World War, fund-raising functions were held at the town hall as part of Wings for Victory Week in May 1943. The town hall continued to serve as the headquarters of the urban district council for much of the 20th century, even after a major fire destroyed much of the main hall on 21 July 1945. Although the main hall remained in a state of disrepair for a few years, it was restored in 1952. The building ceased to be the local seat of government after the enlarged East Devon District Council was formed in 1975. Instead the council chamber became the meeting place of the newly formed Seaton Town Council.

Meanwhile, the masonic lodge relocated from the second floor of the town hall and moved into new premises in Queen Street in the late 1980s. In the early 21st century, following a long period of decline in the utilisation of the building for community events, interest in theatrical performances was revived and The Gateway Theatre was established in the building. In January 2016, East Devon District Council transferred ownership of the building to Seaton Town Council which in turn relocated its offices to the Marshlands Centre in Harbour Road so maximising the space available in the town hall for theatrical and community events.
