= St Michael's Church, Colyford =

Church in Devon, England

St Michael's Church
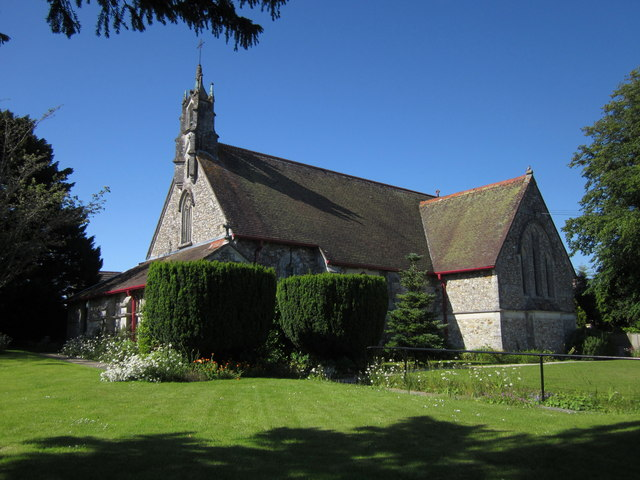
- St Michael's Church

Religion
- Affiliation: Church of England
- Ecclesiastical or organizational status: Active
- Year consecrated: 1903

Location
- Location: Colyford, Devon, England
- Interactive map of St Michael's Church
- Coordinates: 50.7267°N 3.0658°W

Architecture
- Architect: R. M. Fulford
- Type: Church
- Completed: 1889

St Michael's Church is a Church of England church in Colyford, Devon, England. Built in 1888–89, St Michael's has been Grade II listed since 1984. Today it forms one of five churches of the Colyton Parish and Holyford Mission Community.

== History ==
St Michael's was erected in 1888–89 at the expense of Mrs. J. L. Scarborough and her son Mr. Elijah Impey Scarborough "to the glory of God and in memory of Admiral Impey", Mrs. Scarborough's father. It was designed by Mr. R. M. Fulford and built by Messrs Luscombe and Son of Exeter. Although a private chapel, it was used as a chapel of ease for the residents of Colyford and was declared open by the Bishop of Exeter, Edward Bickersteth, during a ceremony on 17 January 1889.

The church was later handed over to the Ecclesiastical Commissioners by Mr. Scarborough for the benefit of the village. It was consecrated on 17 March 1903 by the Bishop of Crediton, Robert Trefusis, in place of the Bishop of Exeter who was unable to attend due to ill health. St Michael's continues to hold Sunday services on a weekly basis and is also used for social events. In January 2015, the church's 125th anniversary was celebrated with a Songs of Praise service.

== Architecture ==
St Michael's was built in an Arts and Crafts style using local flint rubble, with quoins, bands, windows and copings of Beer limestone, and the internal use of buff and red brick. The roof was built using tiles from Staffordshire and pitch pine on the inside. A bellcote was added to the west gable and contains corbels, gablets and a spirelet. The church, made up of a nave, chancel, south transept, south-west porch and north vestry, was built to accommodate 200 persons on open benches of pine. Three stained glass windows at the east end of the church were designed by Mr. F. Drake of Exeter. The font is made from carved Beer stone with a Hamstone base.

Following the death of Mrs. Scarborough, her son had oak reredos added to the church in 1892 in her memory. In 1895, friends of the Scarborough family commissioned Mr. F. Drake to design and install a stained glass window for the church, commemorating "the return of Mr and Mrs E. J. Scarborough and family to their native home after a sojourn of three years in California".
