= Colyford =

Village in Devon, England

Coordinates: 50.72695°N 3.06443°W

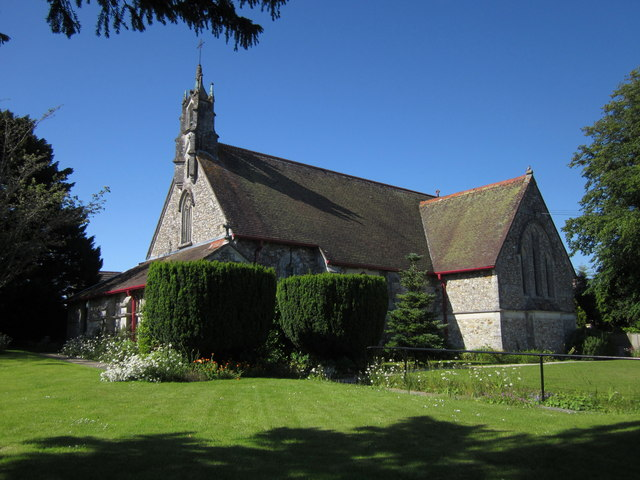

- Location within Devon
- OS grid reference: SY249924
- Civil parish: Colyford
- District: East Devon
- Shire county: Devon
- Region: South West
- Country: England
- Sovereign state: United Kingdom
- Post town: COLYTON
- Postcode district: EX24
- Police: Devon and Cornwall
- Fire: Devon and Somerset
- Ambulance: South Western
- UK Parliament: Honiton and Sidmouth

Colyford is a village and civil parish in the East Devon district, in the county of Devon, England. It is situated midway between Lyme Regis and Sidmouth on the A3052 road. To the north, the village borders the town of Colyton. To the south is the seaside resort town Seaton, separated from Colyford by the Seaton Wetlands, a series of nature reserves flanking the estuary of the River Axe. Colyford lies on the River Coly, which flows into the River Axe immediately to the east of the village.

Colyford was formerly an ancient borough in the civil parish of Colyton; on 1 April 2023 it became a civil parish in its own right.

== Features ==
Colyford is served by St Michael's Church. There is a post office, a butcher and two pubs.

Colyton Grammar School dates from 1546 and made headlines in recent years as the first school to 'opt out' of local authority control and gain grant-maintained status and for achieving very high rankings in national examination league tables.

Colyford is home to a petrol station built in 1927–8. Although it no longer sells fuel, the filling station still displays 1950s petrol pumps.

The annual Goose Fayre is held on the last Saturday in September and draws crowds from all around.

== Transport ==
=== Tram ===
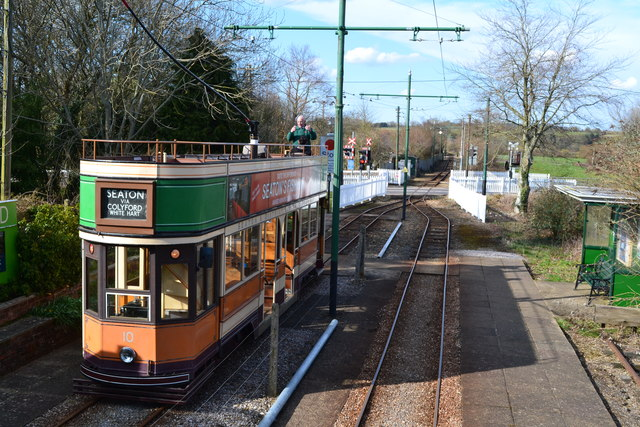
The tram stop at Colyford, with the level crossing beyond

Seaton Tramway runs over part of the former Seaton Branch line between Seaton, Colyford and Colyton. The branch closed in 1966, and tram services from Riverside commenced in August 1970, reaching Colyford in April 1971. Journey times from Colyford station are 15 minutes to Seaton and 10 minutes to Colyton. The Tramway operates a daily service from Easter to the end of October and a more limited service outside of this period.

=== Bus ===
Colyford is served by AVMT Buses' service 885 that runs between Beer & Axminster via Seaton & Colyton. Dartline 20 also serves Colyford between Seaton and Taunton via Honiton. The Stagecoach X30 runs three times a day between Seaton and Exeter (via Colyford) in each direction, with no service at weekends or Bank Holidays.
