= Seaton, Devon =

Town in Devon, England

Coordinates: 50.705°N 3.078°W

Seaton
- Seaside town and civil parish
- Seaton Seafront

- Location within Devon
- Interactive map showing the parish boundary
- Population: 7,688 (2021 census)
- OS grid reference: SY239900
- District: East Devon
- Shire county: Devon
- Region: South West
- Country: England
- Sovereign state: United Kingdom
- Post town: Seaton
- Postcode district: EX12
- Dialling code: 01297
- Police: Devon and Cornwall
- Fire: Devon and Somerset
- Ambulance: South Western
- UK Parliament: Honiton and Sidmouth

Seaton (/ˈsiːtən/) is a seaside town, fishing harbour and civil parish in East Devon on the south coast of England, between Axmouth (to the east) and Beer (to the west). It faces onto Lyme Bay and is on the Jurassic Coast, a World Heritage Site. A sea wall provides access to the mostly shingle beach stretching for about a mile, and a small harbour on the River Axe estuary.

Seaton is approximately 52 miles (84 km) east-northeast of Plymouth, 20 miles (32 km) east-southeast of Exeter, and 52 miles (84 km) west of Bournemouth. At the 2021 census, the parish had a population of 7,688.

== History ==
A farming community existed here 4,000 years before the Romans arrived, and there were Iron Age forts in the vicinity at Seaton Down, Hawkesdown Hill, Blackbury Camp and Berry Camp. During Roman times this was an important port although the town's Roman remains have been reburied to preserve them. In Saxon times Seaton was known as Fluta or Fleet, the Saxon word for creek. The town of Fleet was founded by Saxon Charter in 1005 AD. The first mention of Seaton was in a papal bull by Pope Eugene III in 1146.

Seaton was an important port for several centuries, supplying ships and sailors for Edward I's wars against Scotland and France. In the 14th century heavy storms caused a landslip which partially blocked the estuary, and the shingle bank started to build up. In 1868 the arrival of the railway reduced the use of the harbour.

In 2013 Laurence Egerton, a metal detector enthusiast, found a collection of some 22,000 copper-alloy Roman coins. The "Seaton Down Hoard" is one of the largest and best-preserved collections of 4th-century coins ever found in Britain.

The church on the edge of town was built in the 14th century, with a squat tower dating from the 15th century.

=== Railway ===
Seaton was served by the Seaton branch line, opened in 1868, from Seaton Junction on the Salisbury to Exeter main line. The railway was successful and considerably assisted in the development of Seaton as a holiday destination. The line had one of the world's first concrete bridges, built over the River Axe in 1877.

With the increase in car ownership in the 1960s, usage of the line declined, and with many other Devon branch lines, it closed in 1966. The nearest railway station now is Axminster, 7 miles (11 km) away.

Part of the trackbed was purchased in 1969 to construct Seaton Tramway, which opened in 1970 and links Seaton with Colyford and Colyton.

=== Holiday resort ===
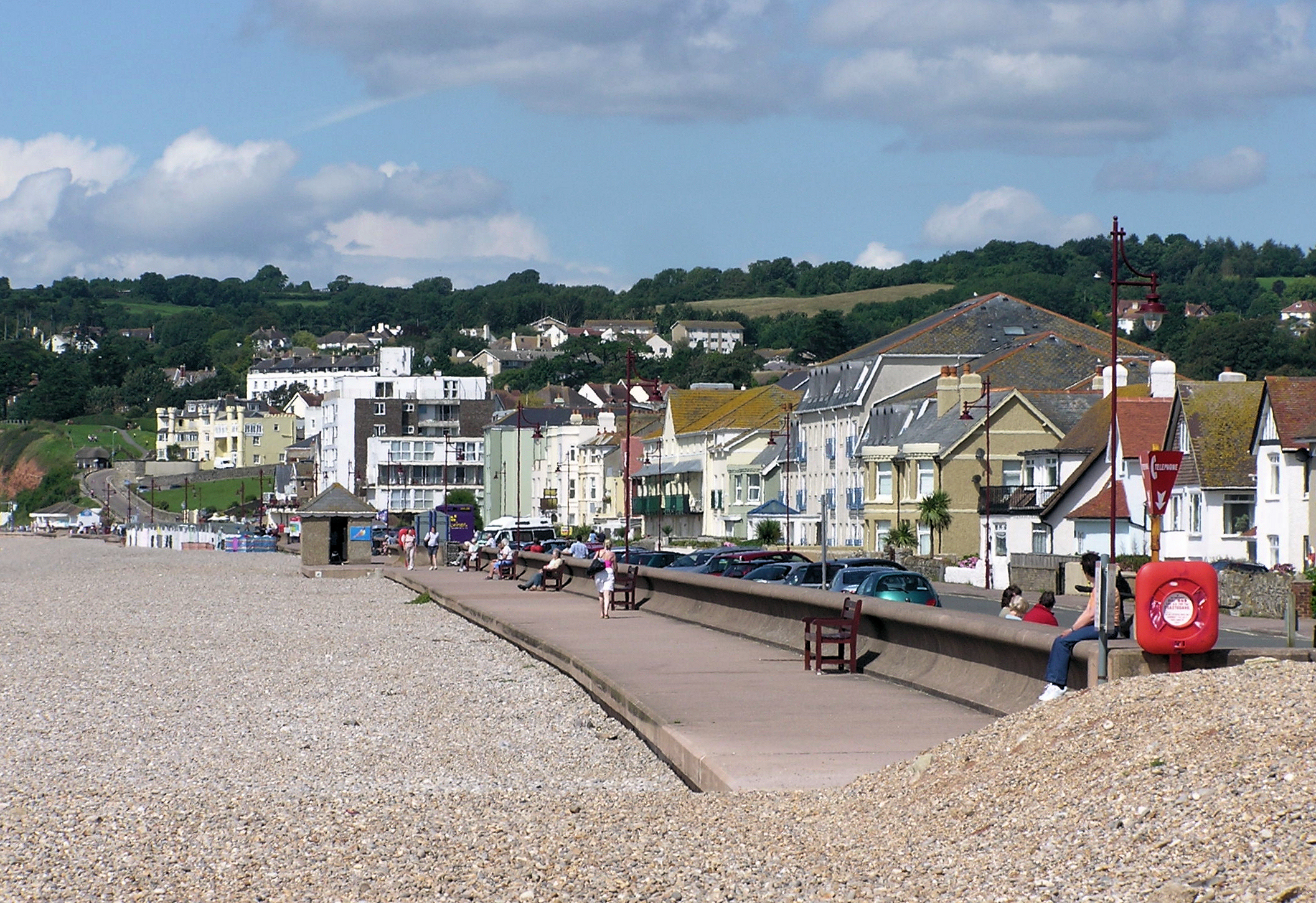
The sea front

In the 19th century Seaton developed as a holiday resort, which it remains to this day. A Warners holiday camp opened in 1935 close to the station, encouraged by the ease of travel. Seaton lost its largest holiday camp at the beginning of 2009.

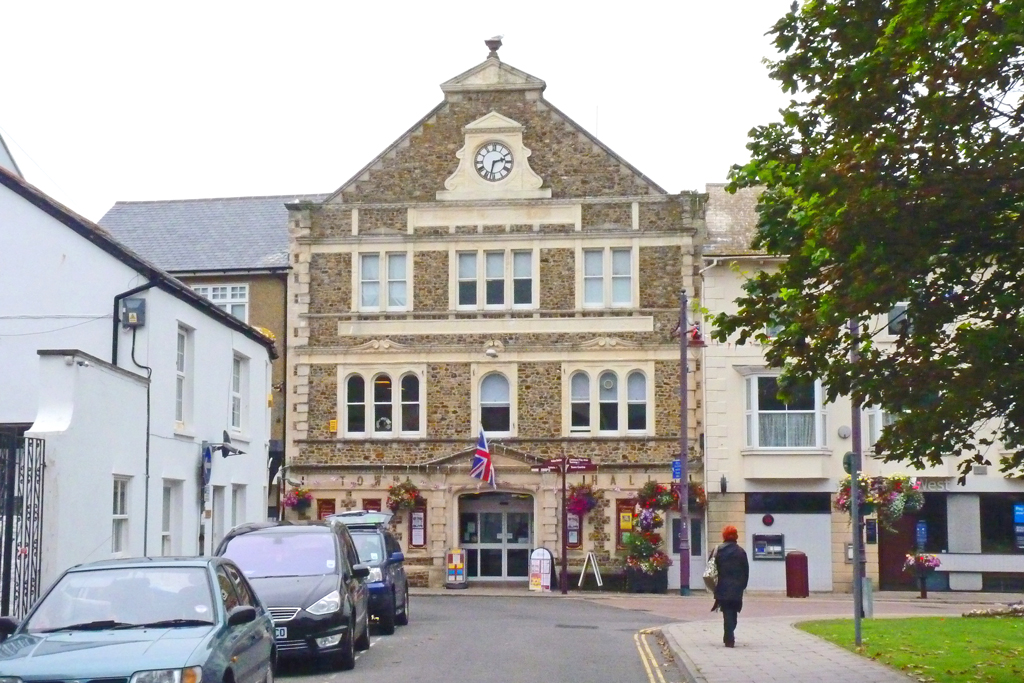
Seaton Town Hall

Many of the town buildings are Victorian, including a notable collection of large houses at Seaton Hole, but the town also has notable buildings from the 1930s and later periods. Seaton Town Hall, now used as a theatre, was completed in 1904.

=== Recent history ===
The area to the east of the retail area to the River Axe (mainly floodplain) has been the subject of a regeneration plan formulated in 2003 and approved in detail in 2009, despite local opposition. As of early 2011, the level of the site has been raised above flood level using a million tons of sand brought in by sea. A large Tesco supermarket and filling station have been built on one half of this site: the other half is to be offered for residential development. A Jurassic Coast Discovery Centre has also been erected nearby, being completed in 2016. A further residential development is planned along the riverside.

As of October 2019 work has begun on a £200,000 skate-park.

== Demographics ==
At the 2021 census, Seaton civil parish had a population of 7,688 people in 3,874 households. The Office for National Statistics also define a Seaton "built-up area" which excludes rural parts of the parish and had a population of 7,435 in 2021.

Census population of Seaton parish
Census	Population	Female	Male	Households	Source
2001	6,798	3,675	3,123	3,304	
2011	7,096	3,836	3,260	3,564	
2021	7,688	4,101	3,587	3,874	

== Transport ==
Seaton is just off the A3052 road which starts at Exeter to the West and Lyme Regis to the East.

The Seaton Tramway runs frequent old style tram services to Colyton between February and October, Christmas and New Year.

Seaton's nearest railway station is Axminster (around 7 miles (11 km) away) on the West of England line linking Exeter to London Waterloo.

Some of the bus services in the town are provided by Axe Valley Mini Travel (AVMT) who run services to many of the nearby towns and villages including Axminster, Branscombe, Sidmouth, Colyton, Beer & Lyme Regis. Stagecoach South West operates services to Exeter via Sidmouth and via Honiton along with limited services to Taunton which also run via Honiton. Hatch Green Coaches also provide services around the town itself.

Seaton is on route 2 of the National Cycle Network.

== Natural history ==
=== Geology ===
The coastal cliffs either side of Seaton have long been of interest to geologists. To the East are the characteristically red-coloured cliffs of Triassic age rocks assigned to the Branscombe Mudstone Formation, capped by younger rocks (Cretaceous) of the Upper Greensand Formation and finally by chalk. The Seaton Fault, which is visible at Seaton Hole at the western end of the beach, is responsible for the presence of significant chalk cliffs extending to Beer Head. In common with much of this coast the cliffs in this area are prone to landslip and collapse, such movement restricting coastal development and presenting a hazard to those walking the coast.

=== Wildlife ===
The area around Seaton is rich in wildlife. The agricultural landscape supports areas of ancient woodland (often with displays of bluebells), important networks of hedges, unimproved grassland and springline mires.

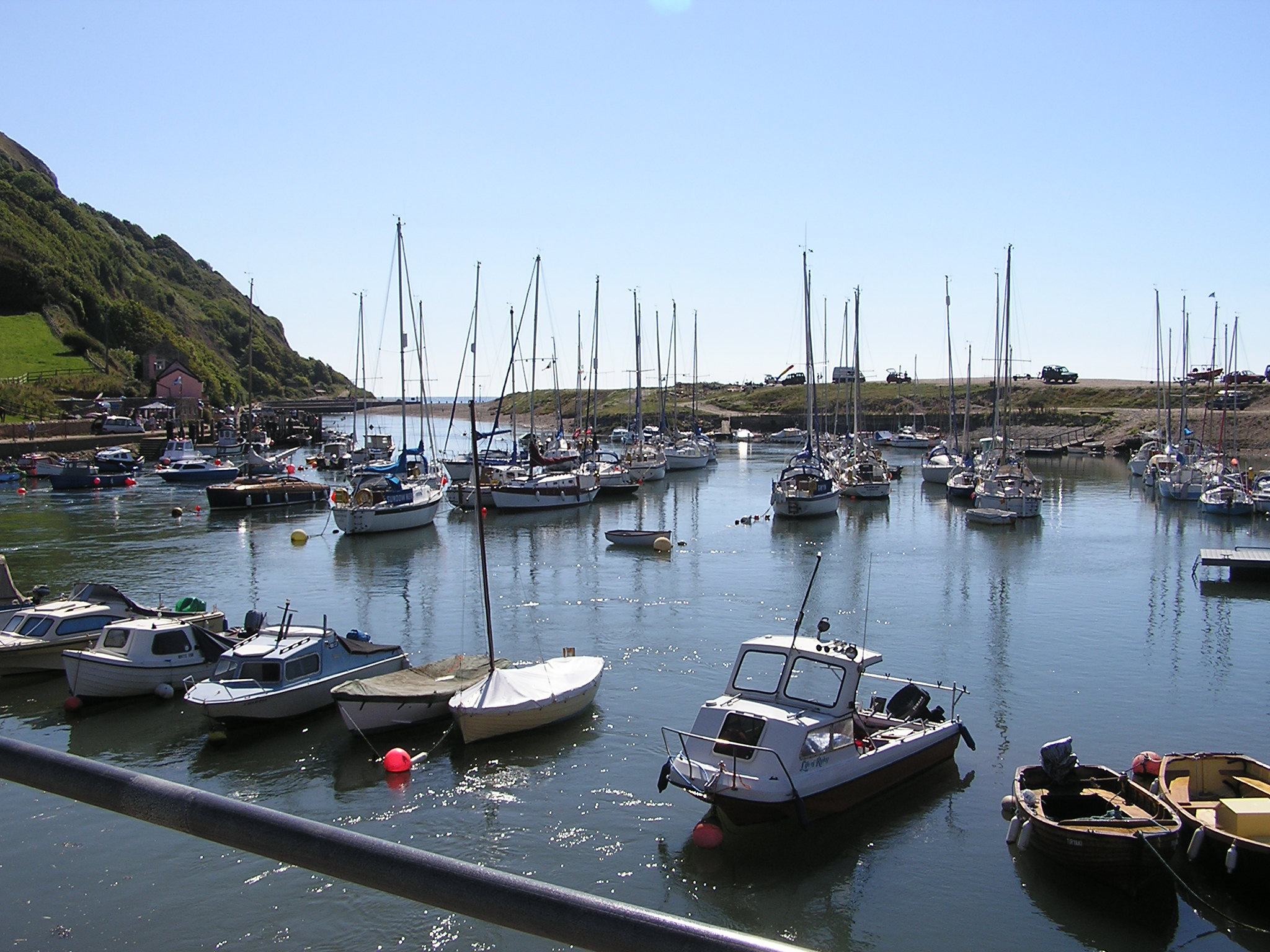
The harbour

Around Beer there are remnants of flower-rich chalk grassland, a rare habitat in Devon. The Axe Estuary, with its areas of grazing marsh, and the River Axe itself, are of international importance for their aquatic communities. To the east of the Axe lies the Axmouth to Lyme Regis Undercliffs National Nature Reserve. This large area of coastal landslides and cliffs supports important woodland and grassland habitats and is of considerable significance for its geology. To the west of the Axe is a series of nature reserves, collectively known as Seaton Wetlands and including Seaton Marshes, Black Hole Marsh, Colyford Common and Stafford Marsh. Between them, these reserves include freshwater grazing marshes, intertidal lagoons, scrapes, ditches and bird hides, and are host to a diverse variety of birds and mammals.

Eurasian otters are present on the River Axe, and at the end of 2009 are being seen regularly on Seaton marshes/Colyford Common. Dormice are present throughout the area. To the west, near Beer, are man-made caves of importance for a diversity of hibernating bats, including the very rare Bechstein's bat. The Axe Estuary and its marshes are important for wintering wildfowl and waders, such as Eurasian curlew and common redshank, while in the summer butterflies and dragonflies abound. In 2007, an Audouin's gull was seen here – the fourth British record of this bird.

== Attractions ==
Seaton Tramway offers a 3 miles (4.8 km) ride through the Axe and Coly valleys to Colyford and Colyton. It runs alongside the Axe estuary, giving panoramic views of the nature reserves and the estuary wildlife. Seaton tram station, opened in 2018, includes a fully enclosed facility featuring a four track layout, Claude's Diner and a gift shop.

On 26 March 2016 the Seaton Jurassic Centre opened in the town. This was a time travelling experience telling the story of the natural heritage of the Jurassic Coast past and present. The attraction closed in September 2021, but has a current planned reopening under the name Jurassic Discovery, now operated by Seaton Tramway. The soft play and cafe area opened at the new centre in March 2024 with the rest of the building planned to launch later in the year.

== Industry ==
Its position next to floodplains and hemmed in by hills on either side means expansion is difficult and has hampered growth of local employment. In 2010 redevelopment of a large portion of the town commenced with new business sites providing a surge in non-seasonal employment.

== Media ==
Local TV coverage is provided by BBC South West and ITV West Country, received from the Stockland Hill TV transmitter. Local radio stations are BBC Radio Devon, Heart West, Greatest Hits Radio South West and East Devon Radio, a community based station. The town is served by the local newspaper, Midweek Herald which publishes on Wednesdays.

Between 1976 and 1990, the town was home to the Independent Broadcasting Authority's Harman Engineering Training College, which trained broadcast engineers.

== Twin towns ==
Seaton is twinned with Thury-Harcourt-le-Hom in France.
