= Seaton Junction railway station =

Disused railway station in Devon, England

Coordinates: 50°45′47″N 03°03′58″W

Seaton Junction
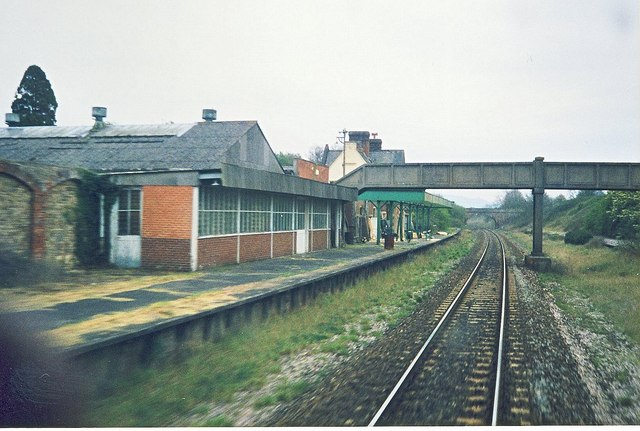
- Station buildings in 1995.

General information
- Location: Seaton Junction nr Shute, East Devon; England
- Platforms: 3

Other information
- Status: Disused

History
- Original company: London and South Western Railway
- Post-grouping: Southern Railway; Southern Region of British Railways

Key dates
- 19 July 1860: Opened as Colyton for Seaton
- 16 March 1868: Renamed Colyton Junction
- July 1869: Renamed Seaton Junction
- 7 March 1966: Closed to passengers
- 8 May 1967: Goods facilities withdrawn
Location

Seaton Junction is a closed railway station on the West of England Main Line from London Waterloo to Exeter. It was situated 3 miles (4.8 km) west of Axminster and 7 miles (11 km) east of Honiton. It was previously known as Colyton for Seaton and Colyton Junction.

== History ==
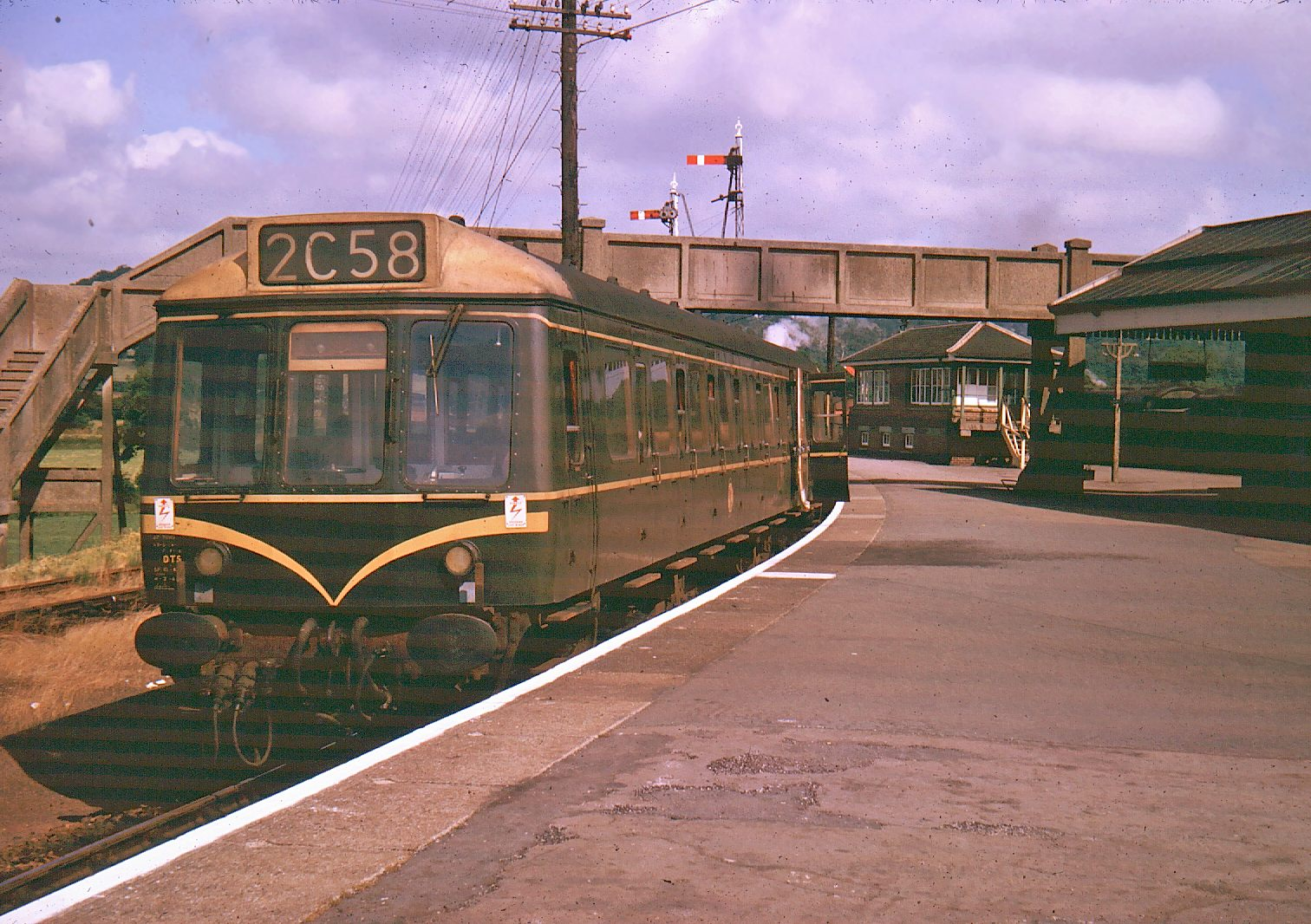
Seaton Junction station in August 1964

Originally named "Colyton for Seaton" the station opened on 19 July 1860 on completion of the Exeter Extension of the London and South Western Railway from Yeovil Junction to Exeter Queen Street.

With the opening of the Seaton & Beer Railway on 16 March 1868 the name was changed to "Colyton Junction", before finally becoming "Seaton Junction" on 18 July 1869.

Originally, trains arriving from the Seaton branch had to reverse into the "down" (westbound) platform. However, when the station was reconstructed in 1927–8 with two through tracks on the main line and loops to the newly extended platforms, a branch line platform was added. This was set at an angle of 45° to the main line.

The location of the station created a major problem for westbound trains stopping at Seaton Junction since it was situated at the start of a six-mile climb at 1 in 80 to the summit of the line at Honiton tunnel.

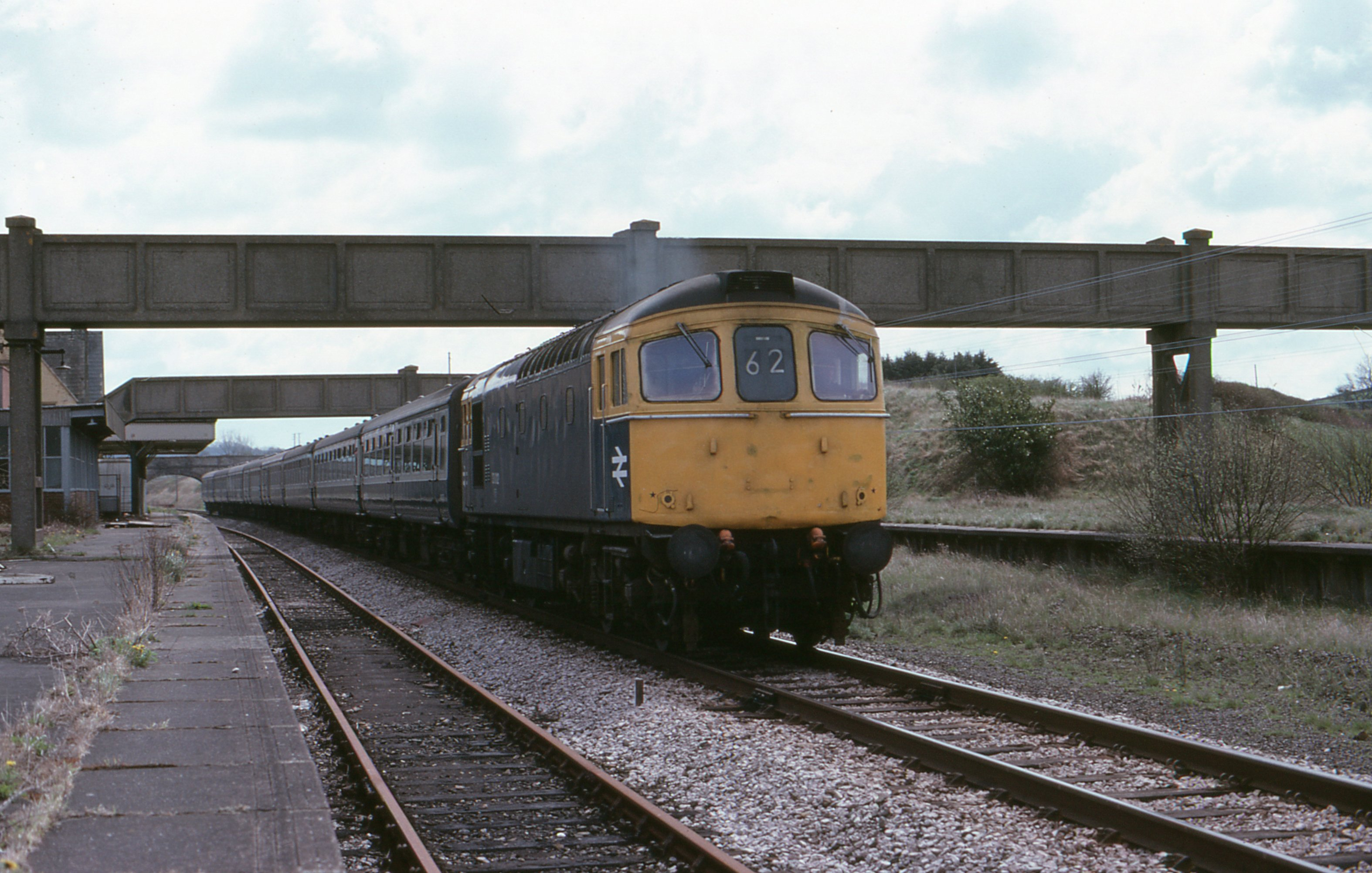
A British Rail Class 33 in the station in 1979, since the station was closed.

The steady decline in holiday traffic resulting from increased car ownership in the 1960s led to a gradual run down of services and the branch line and junction station were closed on 7 March 1966 by the Western Region of British Railways.

Preceding station	Historical railways	Following station
Axminster; Line and station open	British Rail; Southern Region; West of England Main Line	Honiton; Line and station open
	Disused railways	
Colyton; Line and station closed	British Rail; Southern Region; Seaton Branch Line	Terminus

== Stationmasters ==
- George Evans 1868 - 1879 (afterwards station master at Chard)
- G. Smith ca. 1881
- James Lock 1882 - 1888 (afterwards station master at Torrington)
- Mr. Geoghan 1888 - ca. 1895 (formerly station master at Lapford)
- John Hobbs 1898 - 1904 (formerly station master at Camelford, afterwards station master at Sidmouth Junction)
- William J. Brown 1904 - 1909 (formerly station master at Whimple, afterwards station master at Chard)
- William Thomas Smith 1909 - 1912 (formerly station master at Bridstowe)
- Arthur J. Hatyer 1912 - 1926 (afterwards station master at Axminster)
- W.A. Palmer 1926
- H.R. Evans 1926 - 1933 (afterwards station master at Hither Green)
- A.G. Carter 1933 - 1939 (afterwards station master at Petersfield)
- W.H.W. Beer 1939 - 1945

== Present day ==
As of 2026, the station building is a private residence. The up platform is still visible (albeit overgrown). The footbridge from the down platform still survives. Trains still pass the site on the West of England Main Line.

== See also ==
- Seaton Tramway
