= Seaton branch line =

Former railway branch line in Devon, England

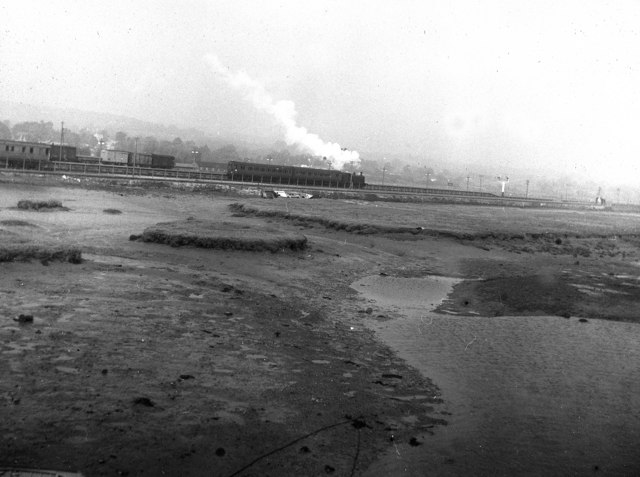
- A train on the Seaton branch by the Axe estuary in 1956

Overview
- Locale: England
- Stations: 4

Service
- Operator(s): London and South Western Railway, Southern Railway

History
- Opened: 16 March 1868
- Closed: 7 March 1966

Technical
- Line length: 4.25 mi (6.84 km)
- Track gauge: 4 ft 8 1/2 in (1,435 mm) standard gauge
Route map
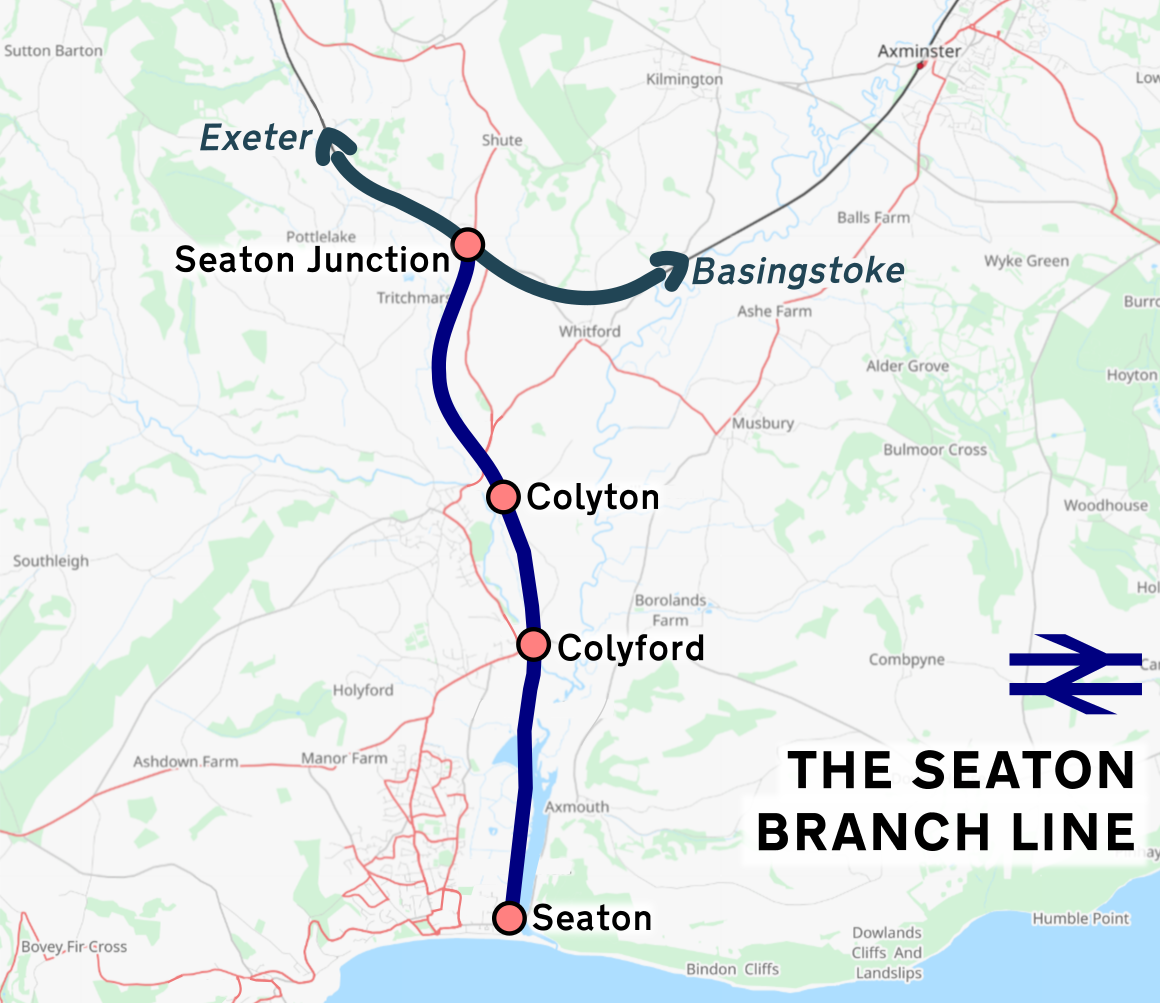
(Click to expand)

The Seaton branch line was a railway branch line connecting the seaside resort of Seaton, in the English county of Devon, to the main line network at Seaton Junction railway station, on the main line between Salisbury and Exeter.

The branch line opened in 1868; it became very popular with holidaymakers, greatly enhancing the attraction of the resort, but it declined and the line was closed in 1966.

== Origins ==
The small town of Seaton became a seaside holiday resort in the middle of the nineteenth century, although its historic port activity had declined to the use of fishing boats only. When the London and South Western Railway (L&SWR) opened a main line from Yeovil to Exeter in 1860, completing a route from London, local people saw that a rail connection might reinvigorate their town. However the difficult terrain of the Devon Coast in the area forced the L&SWR to align its route a considerable distance to the north. They opened a station called Colyton for Seaton, near Shute. The station was four miles from Seaton, and over a mile from Colyton.

Seaton and Beer Railway Act 1863
- Act of Parliament
- Parliament of the United Kingdom
- Long title: An Act for making a Railway from the London and South-western Railway to Seaton, otherwise Seaton-with-Beer in the County of Devon; and for other Purposes.
- Citation: 26 & 27 Vict. c. cxviii

Dates
- Royal assent: 13 July 1863

Text of statute as originally enacted

Local people wanted an actual rail link to the town, and after a first failed attempt to obtain an act of Parliament for the purpose, they were successful, obtaining the Seaton and Beer Railway Act 1863 (26 & 27 Vict. c. cxviii) for the "Seaton and Beer Railway" on 13 July 1863. The company had an authorised capital of £36,000, and powers for a loan of £12,000, for the construction of a line from near the L&SWR Colyton station to a Seaton station to the east of the town.

The Seaton and Beer Railway Act 1863 included powers to construct a bridge over the River Axe, giving access to Axmouth.

== Construction ==
At a company meeting on 5 December 1863, Sir Walter Trevelyan was elected chairman of the company, and W. R. Galbraith the engineer.

A contract for the construction was awarded to Howard Ashton Holden, signed on 8 January 1864, but progress was extremely slow, and in April 1865 the company wrote to Holden threatening suspension of the contract. On 27 September 1865 the company terminated Holden's contract on Galbraith's advice. Two alternative potential contractors fell by the wayside, and it was obvious that the available firms lacked the financial resources to undertake the work. The company itself was now running short of money, and it had to obtain a further £12,000 by a 5% preference share issue and a £4,000 loan in an attempt to fund the work more directly, and John Sampson was engaged to carry the work on, with considerable financial assistance from the company. Even Galbraith, on the company's authority, was unable to obtain a locomotive to hire for the conduct of the works. With horses instead, he took direct control of the works, with Sampson in effect his site manager.

The planned opening for the summer season of 1867 was abandoned, but by 2 August 1867 a locomotive was found to be hired in to work on the construction. Several small contracts were let for constructing buildings; an understanding regarding the supply of water to Seaton station was found to be unsatisfactory, and an alternative with Sir Walter Trevelyan had to be hastily arranged.

The working arrangements with the L&SWR seem to have been left unclear. The company wished the L&SWR to work the line for them, and they tried to obtain more favourable financial terms than the L&SWR offered, and for a time considered working the line themselves. However the vulnerabilities of operating such a short line with the risk of accident or locomotive failure disrupting matters. At length the company agreed the L&SWR terms.

The company submitted the line for formal approval by the Board of Trade's Railway Inspectorate, and Colonel Yolland visited on 27 December 1867, but he objected to the company's proposed connection at Colyton (i.e. the junction with the L&SWR main line): branch trains arriving were to run past the station and then propel back 200 yards to use the down (westbound) platform of the main line, rather than having a separate bay platform. There were numerous other matters of detail objected to.

When Yolland revisited for a second inspection on 19 February 1868, he was satisfied with all the minor issues except one, but the platforming arrangement at Colyton Junction was outstanding. However Sir Walter Trevelyan had an interview with the president of the Board of Trade, and the outcome was that this objection would be laid aside on the company's undertaking to provide a branch line platform in six months on request from the Board of Trade.

At the end of February 1868 the company received a letter from the L&SWR in which it declared its own objections, mainly connected with the provision of more durable structures. The Seaton and Beer Railway Company went to arbitration over the L&SWR's demands, and the arbitrator found that limited improvements only were required.

The arbitration award referred to above was notified by letter on 15 March 1868.

== Opening ==
Accordingly, the branch line opened for traffic on 16 March 1868. The L&SWR worked the line. There were five trains each way each weekday, with mixed operation for two up and one down trains. Branch trains arriving at Colyton (later Seaton Junction) ran past the station towards Exeter to the point of convergence with the main line, and then reversed back into the down (westbound) platform.

The 1:30 PM train from Seaton reversed at the Junction and ran to Axminster to make a connection for London, returning and making a connection out of the 10:50 AM from Waterloo.

The line was 4¼ miles long; there were two intermediate stations, at Colyton Town and Colyford; Colyton (on the L&SWR main line) was renamed Colyton Junction on the same day. (It was renamed Seaton Junction on 18 July 1869 (Note: Williams says 1 September 1869.) to avoid confusion with the Town station.)

== Traffic and operation ==
In the three and a half months to 30 June 1868, the line had only earned £300 from "coaching" and £43 from goods; the L&SWR retained £155 and the company received £145. However, by 1870 matters much had improved, with 81,000 passengers and 13,928 tons of goods being carried in that year; in the same year the platform at Seaton was extended by 180 feet to accommodate the now-heavy volume of passenger traffic.

The line was worked at first by Beattie 2-2-2 well tanks, no 12 Jupiter and 3 Phoenix being in use at the beginning. O2 and T1 class 0-4-4 tank engines replaced the Beattie engines in the 1890s, occasionally supported by an Adams radial 4-4-2T. From 1930 auto train operation was begun on the branch.

The M7 0-4-4 tank engines are most associated with the line in its post-war years; these engines used the Westinghouse brake on passenger trains, making a characteristic sound as the train brake pipe was charged with compressed air.

Bulleid light pacifics were reported to have run on the branch.

On summer Saturdays after 1949 there was considerable extra traffic on the line, with two locomotives together operating nine-coach trains with through coaches to and from London. However, from 1962 through working to and from the branch ceased.

Diesel multiple unit working took over the branch from 4 November 1963.

When the line opened, it was operated on the "one engine in steam" system, but from 5 March 1899 the Tyers electric tablet system was instituted, with an intermediate signalbox at Colyton.

== Original engineering ==
The original track on the branch was 65 lbs per yard flat bottom rail in 24 feet lengths fastened direct to cross-sleepers on 12 inches of ballast.

The line was on easy gradients from Seaton to Colyford, and then rose at 1 in 76 with some short easier sections, to the junction with the main line.

== The bridge to Axmouth ==
The original powers for the company had included the provision of a toll bridge over the River Axe to the east of Seaton station, giving access to the village of Axmouth. The small harbour there had road access on that side of the Axe. A contract for the bridge was let to William Jackson of Westminster on 15 December 1875; the engineer was Philip Brannon.

Axmouth Bridge was opened on 24 April 1877, with a central span of 50 feet and two side spans of 30 feet span. It was constructed in concrete, and "is believed to be one of the first bridges in the UK to be constructed in concrete, with the adjoining toll house being the oldest concrete house in England."

The bridge is listed as a scheduled monument by Historic England who report that: "Axmouth Bridge is believed to have been the third concrete bridge to have been built in England and, as the two earlier examples have been demolished, it now stands as the earliest and best example of a mass concrete bridge to survive in the country."

== The L&SWR takes over ==
The company and the L&SWR negotiated a lease of the line to the L&SWR. Awdry says that the company discussed lease terms with the Great Western Railway too. A 1,000 year lease to the L&SWR was effective from 1 January 1880 for a rent of £1,000 in the first year, rising progressively to £1,550. The agreement had an option to purchase, and the L&SWR took ownership on 1 January 1888. However it refused to adopt the Axe bridge, a road bridge immediately to the east of the Seaton station leading to Axmouth; the bridge was taken over by Sir A. W. Trevelyan.

The takeover resulted in the preference shareholders receiving 75% of the nominal value of their stock, the residue going to the ordinary shareholders.

== Improvements at Seaton Junction ==
In 1927–1928, the Southern Railway (who had taken over the L&SWR at the Grouping of the railways in Great Britain) extended and improved the station facilities at Seaton Junction, providing through main tracks with the platform lines on loops; there was a new branch platform (opened on 13 February 1927), which branch trains could use without fouling the main line.

== Closure ==
With the growth of road transport after 1950 and of car ownership in the 1960s, the line declined substantially, and the line was closed on 7 March 1966 in the course of the Beeching axe.

== Seaton Tramway ==
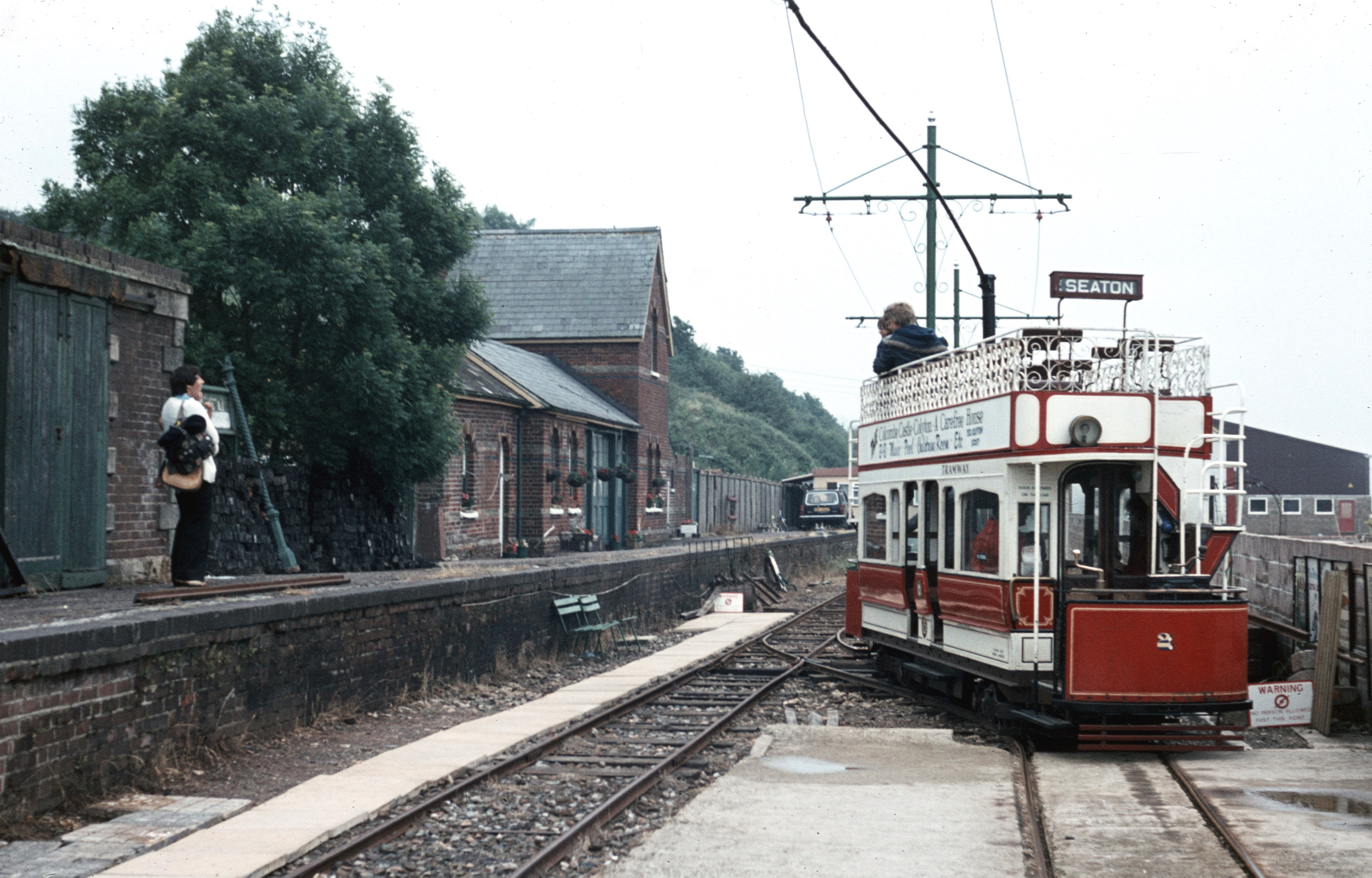
File:Colyton on The Seaton Tramway in July 1982

The alignment between Riverside (just north of the old Seaton Station) and Colyton was purchased by Modern Electric Tramways Ltd, who moved their operations from Eastbourne in 1969 and established Seaton Tramway in 1970. It was extended northwards in stages, reaching Colyford in 1971 and Colyton in 1980.

The original Colyton station building is still in use as the Tramway's gift shop and restaurant. Colyford Station was demolished to make way for a tramway passing loop and siding, with just the old Gents WC remaining, although long since decommissioned.

With Seaton Station unavailable due to demolition and redevelopment, Seaton Tramway opened a new route from Riverside to Seaton Harbour Road/Underfleet in 1975, which does not use any part of the branch line alignment.
