= Seaton Tramway =

Narrow gauge electric tramway in the English county of Devon

Coordinates: 50.722°N 3.059°W

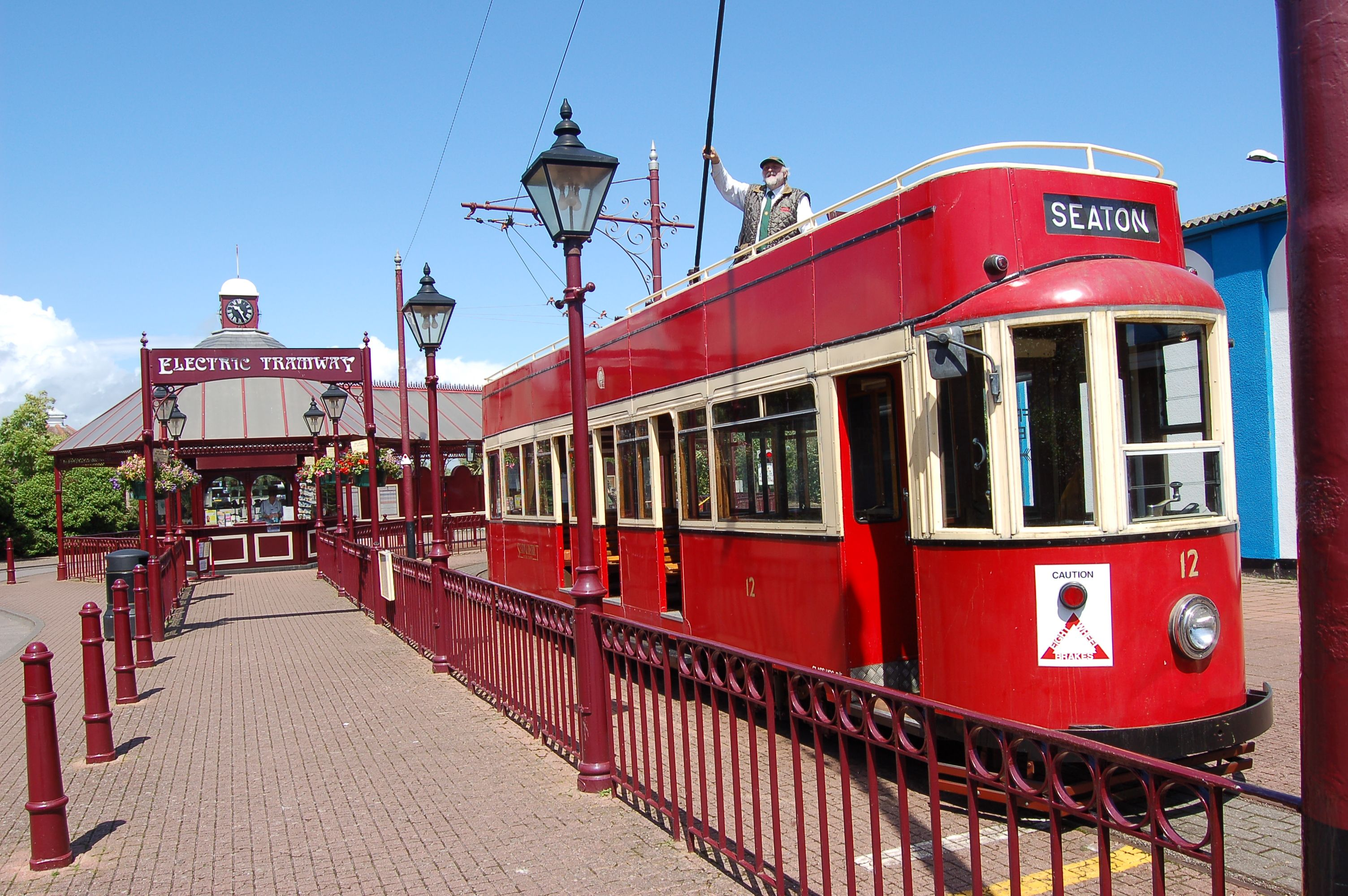
- Seaton Tramway tram 12 at Seaton

Commercial operations
- Name: Seaton & District Electric Tramway Co.
- Built by: Modern Electric Tramways Ltd.
- Original gauge: 2 ft 9 in (838 mm)
- Original electrification: 120 volts DC

Preserved operations
- Stations: 5
- Length: 3 miles (4.8 km)

Preservation history
- 28 August 1970: Opening day, Riverside to Bobsworth Bridge
- 9 April 1971: Extension, Bobsworth Bridge to Colyford
- 17 May 1975: Extension, Riverside to Seaton Harbour Road Car Park
- 8 March 1980: Extension, Colyford to Colyton
- 26 August 1995: Opening of Edwardian-style Seaton Terminus building
- March 1996: Colyton Station improvements
- 1997: Riverside Depot extension
- July 2013: Garden Room extension to Tram Stop Restaurant, Colyton Station
- 28 June 2018: Opening of brand new tram station at Seaton
- 1 August 2022: Opening of Riverside Halt & Seaton Wetlands Halt
Route map
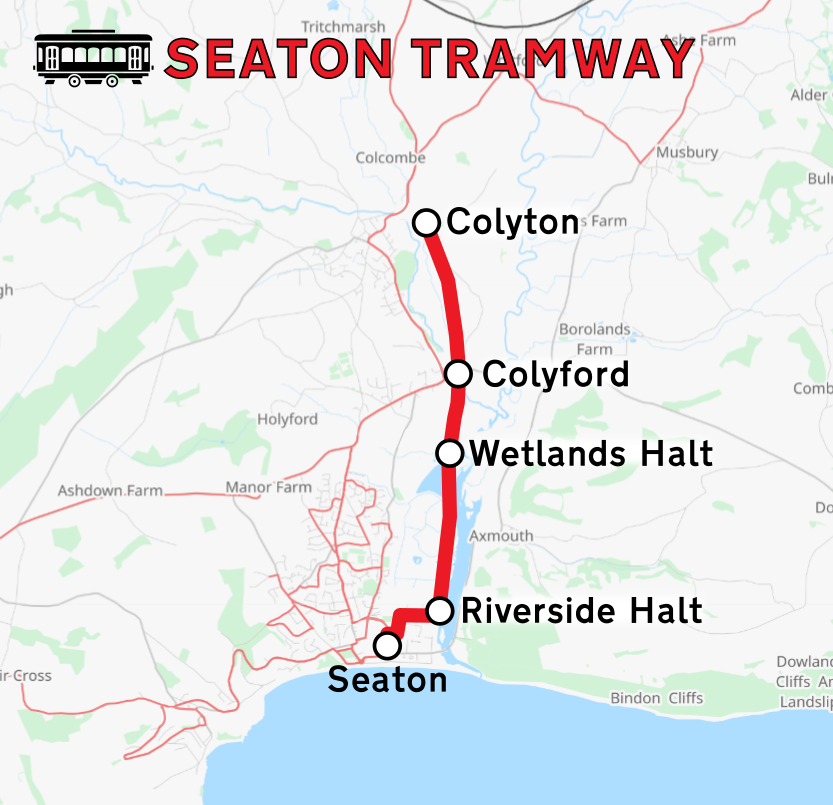
(Click to expand)

The Seaton Tramway is a 2 ft 9 in (838 mm) narrow gauge electric tramway in the East Devon district of South West England. The 3-mile (4.8 km) route runs alongside the Axe Estuary and the River Coly, running between the coastal resort of Seaton, the village of Colyford, and the ancient town of Colyton. For much of its route, it operates between the estuary and the Seaton Wetlands nature reserves, offering views of the wildlife of both.

The tramway operates over part of the former Seaton Branch Line, which closed in March 1966. It was established in 1970 by Claude Lane, founder of Modern Electric Tramways Ltd, which had previously operated in Eastbourne between 1954 and 1969. Fourteen tramcars are part of the visitor attraction, which sees over 100,000 visitors per year. All of the tramcars are based on classic British designs, and vary in size between half-scale (1:2) and two thirds-scale (2:3). Most were built from scratch by Lane and/or his successor Allan Gardner, but three were rebuilt from full-size cars which originally ran in London, Bournemouth and Exeter.

== History ==
=== At St Leonards, Rhyl and Eastbourne ===
Claude Lane was the owner of the Lancaster Electrical Company of Barnet, a manufacturer of battery electric vehicles. His hobby was trams, and in 1949 he constructed a fully portable 15 in (381 mm) gauge tram system that he initially displayed at garden fetes, and then with semi-permanent sites at St Leonards-on-Sea in 1951 and Rhyl from 1952 to 1957. In 1953 he agreed a lease at Eastbourne for a permanent 2 ft (610 mm) gauge system, running the 2/3 mile (1.1 km) between Princes Park and the Crumbles. Lane established Modern Electric Tramways Ltd as the parent company for the new venture.

By 1957 it was clear that the new line was a success, and the Rhyl operation was closed in order to concentrate all efforts on Eastbourne. Over the next nine years, cars 6, 7, 4, 2 & 12 were constructed. By the mid-1960s, it became apparent that the lease at Eastbourne would not be renewed, and so Lane sought a freehold site for a longer line, which would be laid to a wider 2 ft 9in gauge. This was as wide as the 2 ft cars could be regauged, while allowing for larger cars to be built in the future, the first of which was Car 8 in 1968.

=== At Seaton ===
The Beeching Axe was in full swing and the railway branch line to Seaton was closed in 1966. Negotiations to purchase the site from British Rail, and then to obtain the necessary light railway order, took some time and the latter was not granted until December 1969. Relocation from Eastbourne to Seaton took place over the winter of 1969/70.

The new line opened on 28 August 1970, just in time for the end of the holiday season. It was laid to the new 2 ft 9in gauge, with Car 8 operating the first departures. This initial opening was very limited: the line only went as far as the newly christened 'Bobsworth Bridge', named after the inaugural one shilling fare. The overhead electrical supply was yet to be installed, so as a temporary measure each tram was coupled to a battery trailer. Services closed again in September 1970, to allow further work to be completed including the extension to Colyford, erection of overhead traction poles and the gauge conversion of other rolling stock.

Claude Lane suffered a heart attack and died on 2 April 1971, just before the Tramway was due to open for the new season. He died without a will in place, but his nephew Roger persuaded the rest of the Lane family to keep the family money invested, thus allowing the company to continue. Roger Lane joined the board of directors, and Claude's long-time assistant Allan Gardner was appointed managing director. In addition, a large number of volunteers offered their help to complete the tramway, and weekend working parties came to Seaton throughout the 1970s to assist with large-scale work on the track and overhead, and several volunteers gave their expertise to assist with specialist technical projects.

The years 1971 to 1980 were a time of swift expansion. The overhead electrical supply was completed in 1973, and in May 1975 an extension from Riverside Depot to Harbour Road was opened, which gave the Tramway a more visible presence in the centre of the town. Attention then turned towards the extension of the line from Colyford to Colyton. A marathon all-night working party in 1975 excavated the old branch line rail from the level crossing at Colyford, and by the following morning had replaced it with grooved tram rail. Over the next three years, most of the track and overhead wire was put in place, but in 1978 a flash flood just to the north of Colyford washed away a considerable amount of the newly laid ballast, and it was not until 1980 that the extension to Colyton was finally opened.

In 1984, ex-Metropolitan Tramways car 94 (Seaton car 14) was launched, the first addition to the fleet for 16 years, and the inaugural trip was driven by comedian and TV personality Larry Grayson. In 1988, the Allan Gardner-designed Car 17 was built, and in 1992 ex-Bournemouth car 106 (renumbered 16 for Seaton) came into service. 1998 saw the restoration and relaunch of former Exeter tram 19. With the exception of car 17, these trams are enclosed single deck saloons, aimed at providing comfort during bad weather and also to extend the season. Indeed, the success of out of season special events such as the Polar Express resulted in the conversion of car 17 to a fully enclosed saloon in 2016, and it was re-numbered 15.

Between 2004 and 2007, three new cars to a standardised design based on elements from Plymouth and Blackburn tramcars were introduced, carrying numbers 9, 10 and 11.

In 2020 the tramway closed during the COVID-19 Lockdown, from 23 March and reopened again on 4 July. New health and safety procedures were introduced to ensure the tramway was 'Covid Secure' and operated on a reduced timetable. During the lockdown the tramway launched its 'Tramathon Live' appeal, hoping to raise money to ensure its future against any losses it made being closed. The appeal included a week of live videos on Facebook, streaming a Q and A, Riverside Depot tour, a line tour and finished the week going live and driving for a full 24 hours from 12 midday 11 June to 12 midday 12 June. The appeal was successful and raised over £30,000.

In 2020 the tramway also celebrated their 50th anniversary on 28 August. Planned celebrations were cancelled due to COVID-19 but the occasion was marked with some planned specials on trams 4 and 8. Car 8 recreated its first passenger service at 2:30pm between Riverside Depot and Bobsworth Bridge. The charity was recipient of the Cultural Recovery Fund, provided by the government in response to the COVID-19 lockdown. The award was in the amount of £435,100 and went towards wages, maintenance and partners & exhibitions.

== Route ==
=== Seaton tram station ===
Seaton tram station is the southern terminus of the Seaton Tramway. The station is situated in the town centre of the town of Seaton in the English county of Devon. The terminus at Seaton opened in 1975, and has since been entirely rebuilt twice. The most recent rebuilding has resulted in the construction of a modern enclosed building suitable for operation all-year round, and which acts as a venue for a range of tramway and community based events.

From Seaton tram station to the Riverside tram stop, the tramway follows a route, created in the 1970s, running first north by a number of curves to the marshland that lies inland of Seaton and then tuning east to run between the marshland and the town until it reaches the right of way of the former railway branch. At this point are found the line's depot, and the Riverside tram stop. This first stretch of line gives good views of Seaton Marshes, the most southerly of a string low-level nature reserves, collectively known as Seaton Wetlands and all of which are visible at some stage from the tram. Between them, these reserves include freshwater grazing marshes, intertidal lagoons, scrapes, ditches and bird hides, and are host to a diverse variety of birds and mammals such as otters.

=== Riverside Depot and Halt ===
From 1970 to 1975, when Seaton tram station first opened, the line's southern terminus was located at Riverside, just to the north of Riverside Depot. Riverside temporarily became the terminus again in 2017–2018, whilst the new Seaton station was under construction, during which time booking office facilities were provided through the location of tram 01 to the south of Riverside Depot. Riverside has fully surfaced platforms, and a passing loop, and is sometimes used out of season in connection with special events. In February 2020, a new decked extension was constructed, sited between the track and over the river bank, in preparation for Riverside's use as a permanent halt. Completion was delayed due to the effects of the COVID-19 lockdown, and the opening was postponed until 1 August 2022.

=== Seaton Wetlands Halt ===
From Riverside northwards, the tramway follows the old Seaton railway branch line. As far as Colyford, this ran on an embankment separating the Seaton Wetlands, to the west, and the Axe Estuary, to the east. The nature reserves of Seaton Marshes, Black Hole Marsh, Colyford Common and Stafford Marsh are all visible from the tram, as is the tidal estuary and the village of Axmouth on the far bank.

Along this stretch there are two passing loops, known as Axmouth and Swans Nest. Work was undertaken to turn Swan's Next loop into a tram stop, known as Wetlands, which allows passengers direct access to the Seaton Wetlands nature reserves. Work was about to get underway when the COVID-19 lockdown came in to force, so work had to be postposed until winter 2021–2022. Wetlands stop was eventually opened on the same day as the Riverside stop (1 August 2022).

=== Colyford tram station ===
The station is located at the eastern end of Colyford village, adjacent to the White Hart Inn. There are surfaced platforms, and a passenger waiting shelter. The station includes the Colyford passing loop, and there is also a single siding. The railway station's original gentlemen's lavatory is still in its original position, but no longer in use.

Immediately to the north of Colyford, the line crosses the A3052 road on a level crossing. For here the line rises gently, leaving the estuary and wetlands behind and running through farmland. There are two further passing loops, known as Tye Lane and Cownhayne, before Colyton tram station is reached.

=== Colyton tram station ===
The station is the northern terminus of the tramway and is situated about 0.5 miles (0.8 km) from the centre of Colyton town. Unlike the other stations on the tramway, Colyton still retains much of the feel of a former railway station. The original high platform and station buildings still exist, with the buildings housing the Tram Stop Restaurant, a shop and toilets, whilst the platform provides access to the buildings and outdoor tables for the restaurant. There is also a children's play area at the northern end of the track. The former track bed of the station now houses twin tram tracks which are set in block paving.

== Operations ==
Seaton Tramway is a single line system, with passing loops roughly every half mile. The trams run to a timetable which includes scheduled passes at designated passing loops. A single line token system operates between Seaton and Riverside, because this section contains four sharp curves which restrict the driver's line of sight. A two-way radio system is also used to keep drivers in touch with the duty inspector. The scheduled journey time from Seaton to Colyford is 15 minutes, and Colyford to Colyton is a further 12 minutes, making a total journey time of 27 minutes. Prior to the new halts at Riverside and Wetlands opening, the journey time was 23 minutes.

Seaton Tramway operates a daily service between Easter and the end of October, with a weekend-only service operating from mid-February until Easter. In addition, there are several out of season events, principally bird watching specials and Polar Express trips during December.

As of 2022, trams depart every 20 minutes in all services and is operated by a minimum of four trams (up to six in 'pink' service). Additional departures are scheduled at peak times according to demand, which can raise the number of cars in service to seven or eight. Prior to 2022, trams would depart every 30 minutes, in 'Orange Service', operated by four cars.

It is possible for groups of 30 people or more to book a designated tram, which runs in tandem with one of the service cars. Individuals can also book a tram for a range of tram driving lessons and experiences.

A combination of paid and volunteer staff operate the Tramway. A small permanent staff is complemented by a large number of seasonal drivers, shop and cafe staff.

== Fleet list ==
=== Tram cars ===
| Number | Year built | Livery | Current status | Image | Description |
|---|---|---|---|---|---|
| 2 | 1964 | Red and white | Operational | | Design based on a Metropolitan Electric Tramways Type A open-topper, of which Seaton car 14 (ex-MET 94) is an original example. |
| 4 | 1961 | Blackpool Tramway green and cream | Operational | | Based on a Blackpool open boat tram. Claude Lane had built two earlier examples: * 225, built in 1950 and operated at St Leonards, Rhyl and Eastbourne until the late 1950s, and in November 1963 was sold and shipped to a private collector in the US, along with two other early cars, 3 and 238. * 226, built in 1954, rebuilt as a works vehicle in 1960, and finally converted into Tram Shop 01 in 1965 (see car 01 below for more details). |
| 6 | 1954 | Green and cream | Operational | | Originally built as a 15-inch gauge single deck open toast rack (also numbered 6), based on the design that operated at Llandudno & Colwyn Bay. It ran at Rhyl in this configuration. It was rebuilt as a 2 ft gauge open topper in 1956 for operation at Eastbourne, based on the ex-Bournemouth open toppers which ran at Llandudno & Colwyn Bay. It initially had open cross bench seats on the lower deck, but was rebuilt in 1962 with lower deck saloons at either end. It was regauged to 2 ft 9in for operation at Seaton in 1974, and rebuilt again in 1989, reverting to its original cross bench lower deck seating arrangement. |
| 7 | 1958 | Brown and cream | Stored awaiting overhaul | | Based on the ex-Bournemouth open toppers which latterly operated at Llandudno & Colwyn Bay. The same length as Car 6, and just two inches wider, Car 7 has always featured two lower deck saloons. A late 1980s rebuild featured easier-access staircases, and since then it has sported an approximation of the Bournemouth Corporation Tramways livery. The car has been withdrawn since 2007, awaiting restoration. |
| 8 | 1968 | Bristol blue and white | Operational | | Based on the ex-Bournemouth open toppers which latterly operated at Llandudno & Colwyn Bay. Car 8 was the first to be built with consideration to the eventual regauging of the system, with 2 ft 9in chosen to allow for larger trams to be built, without making the existing 2 ft gauge fleet redundant. Initially built with end saloons on the lower deck, a rebuild in 1992 removed the saloons and installed open cross bench seats instead. |
| 9 | 2004 | Two tone blue | Operational | | Based on design elements from Plymouth and Blackburn tramcars. Body built by Bolton Trams Ltd in 2002, trucks and all other fitting out by Seaton Tramway. |
| 10 | 2006 | Orange, green and cream | Operational | | Based on design elements from Plymouth and Blackburn tramcars. Body built by Bolton Trams Ltd in 2002, trucks and all other fitting out by Seaton Tramway. |
| 11 | 2007 | Pink | Operational | | Based on design elements from Plymouth and Blackburn tramcars. Body built by Bolton Trams Ltd in 2002, trucks and all other fitting out by Seaton Tramway. |
| 12 | 1966 | London Transport red and cream | Operational | | Initially built as an enclosed single deck saloon in 1966, with green and white livery, based loosely on Blackpool's English Electric Railcoach trams. It ran in this form at Eastbourne and Seaton until 1975. Rebuilt in 1980 as an open-top double-decker, loosely based on the Blackpool Balloon trams, with seats for up to 48 passengers. There was a further modification in 1999, when its cabs were rebuilt to give it an appearance loosely based on a London Feltham-type tram, and it received a London Transport-style repaint and lettering. |
| 14 | 1904 | Red and white | Operational | | Ex Metropolitan Electric Tramways Type A car 94, a standard gauge open topper, which was subsequently enclosed. Built in 1904 and which ran in London until its withdrawal in 1935. It was then used as a garden shed at Waltham Cross until it was acquired by a group of enthusiasts, and moved to Eastbourne Tramway in 1961. The intention was to restore it to its original condition, but this fell through and Modern Electric Tramways took ownership. The top deck was removed in 1968 and the body narrowed to make it suitable for eventual operation at Seaton. Major work was delayed by the establishment of Seaton Tramway, and the car was not finished until 2 June 1984, when it was launched by the late TV personality Larry Grayson. Seaton Car 2 demonstrates how car 94 looked in 1904. |
| 15 | 1988 | Blue and white | Operational | Blue Electric Tram Car Seaton Tramway 15 at Riverside Loop | Initially built as open toastrack single decker Car 17 in 1988, based on the Manx Electric Railway car of the same number, finished in red and white livery. Capacity of 48 but with removable seats which allowed for the carriage of up to 12 people in their wheelchairs. Rebuilt as an enclosed 32-seat single deck saloon in 2016 and renumbered 15. |
| 16 | 1921 | Maroon and yellow | Operational | | Ex Bournemouth Corporation Tramways car 106, was 3 ft 6in gauge open-top double-decker. Built in 1921 and withdrawn on the closure of the Bournemouth system in 1936. The body was subsequently discovered in use on a Dorset farm, acquired by the Bournemouth Transport Preservation Group and then donated to Seaton Tramway in 1974. As with Car 14 (see above), the body was narrowed, and then rebuilt in its current form. Launched in to service in 1992. |
| 19 | 1906 | Green and white | Operational | | Former Exeter Corporation Tramways car 19, a 3 ft 6in open-top double-decker. Built in 1906 and withdrawn on the closure of the Exeter system in 1931. The body was discovered in use as a summerhouse in the Devon village of Rewe in 1984, and donated to Seaton Tramway in 1994. Rebuilt as a single deck saloon, but due to its shorter length it did not have to be narrowed, unlike cars 14 and 16. Launched into service in 1998 by the Mayor of Exeter, whose predecessor had driven both the first and last Exeter trams. Car 19 is the only known surviving tram from the Exeter system. |
| 01 | 1954 | Yellow and white | Out of Service | | Initially built as car 226 in 1954, the second of the company's Blackpool-inspired "Boat" cars, and ran in this form at Eastbourne until the late 1950s. Then rebuilt as a works vehicle in 1960, and finally converted into Tram Shop 01 in 1965. It remained a self-propelled car at both Eastbourne and Seaton until 1975, when it was regauged to 2 ft 9in and became a trailer. It continued in daily use as the shop and ticket office at Seaton, being towed down by the first tram in the morning, and towed back to the depot by the last departure from Seaton. It finally relinquished this role in 1995, when the first Seaton Terminus building was opened. Since then, it has been used as a staff mess van and ice cream kiosk. During the construction of the new Seaton station in 2017/18, it was once again used as a ticket office and shop at Riverside Depot. As of 2018 the tram car is stored out of service at Riverside Depot, awaiting plans for its future. |
| 02 | 1952 | Grey | Under Overhaul | | Initially commissioned in 1952 by the Air Ministry as a battery-operated 2 ft gauge, single deck four wheel tramcar. However, the ministry cancelled the order and the company retained the vehicle as a works car. In 1968, the body was lengthened and fitted with an overhead inspection gantry, and the four wheel truck was replaced by two standard trucks. It was used intensively throughout the 1970s during the construction of Seaton Tramway. In 1981, the tram was blown over at Colyford during a storm and seriously damaged. The body was again rebuilt, but initially used as a trailer. Eventually it received new motorised trucks in 1992 and returned to service as a self-propelled vehicle. Withdrawn for the 2025 season for overhaul. |

=== Works cars ===
The tramway also operates a number of works cars for transport and engineering functions. These include a number of freight wagons (flat beds, open drop-sides, and tipper wagons), and also specialist engineering vehicles such as a hydraulic hoist trailer (with cherry picker), overhead works trailer, and welding trailer.

The tramway formerly operated a diesel locomotive for works trains. This engine, Ruston and Hornsby 4wDM works number 435398 of 1959, was named Claude. The locomotive was disposed of in 2002, and moved to the Devon Railway Centre.

=== Other cars ===
In 2024, Tram Car 23 returned to the ownership of Seaton Tramway, 75 years after it had been built by Claude Lane. It was the first working tramcar in the history of Modern Electric Tramways, and operated in Rhyl and St Leonard's. When the tramway operations expanded and Lane's trams became larger, running on 2 ft Gauge, Tram 23 was sold into private ownership. It first went to ownership in Scotland, before being handed over to Merseyside Tramway Preservation Society where it was restored for the first time. Later, it was purchased by Denis Butler, who ran the tram in his garden in Warrington. Upon Butler's death in 2023, it was his wish that it would return to Seaton Tramway. In September 2024, a team from Seaton Tramway collected the tram and brought it to Devon, to sit on display in Seaton Station.

== Gallery ==
Images of Seaton Tramway
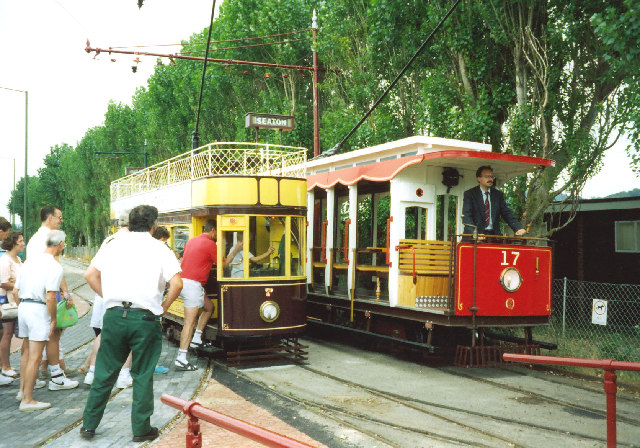
Seaton Terminus in 1995

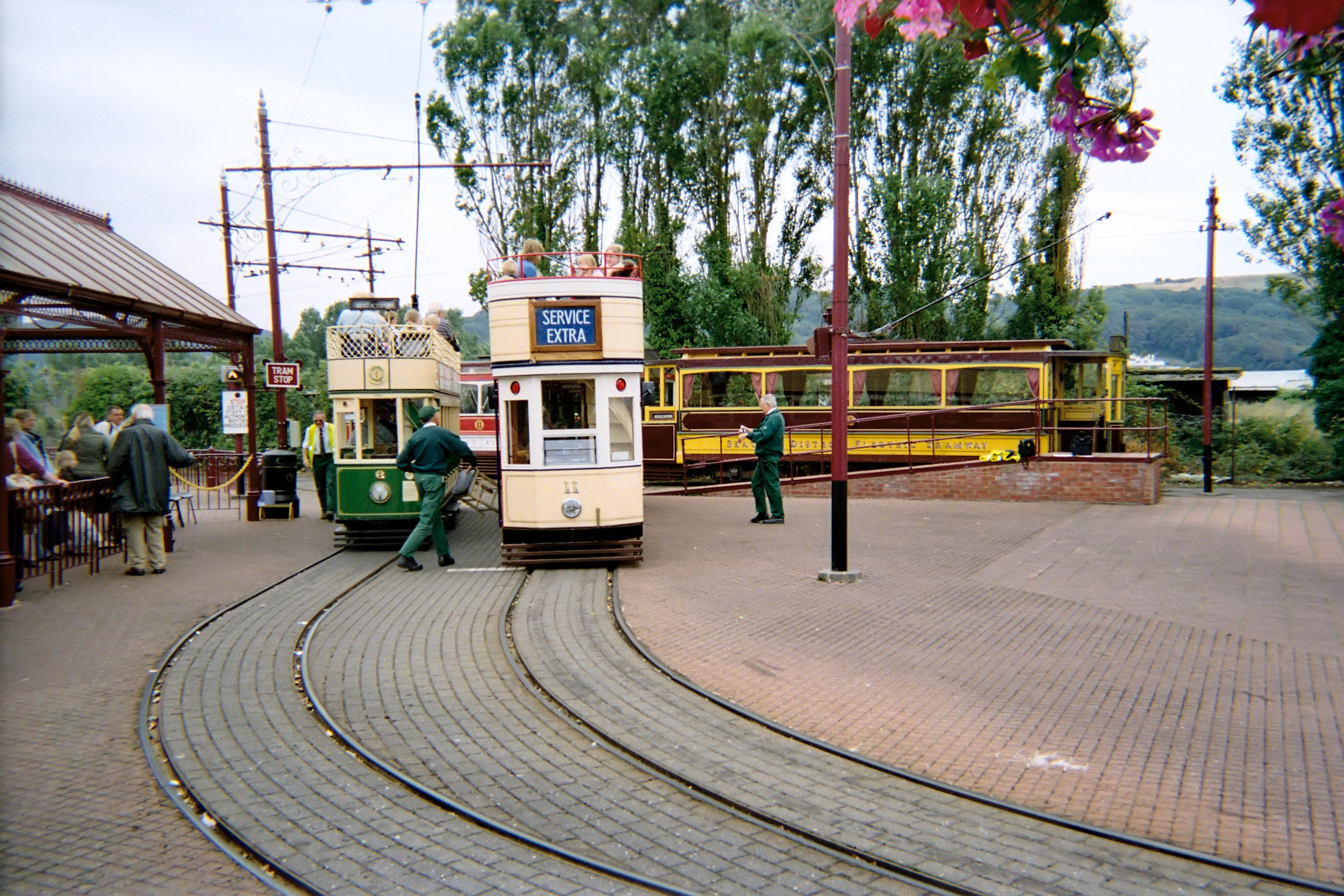
Seaton Terminus 2006

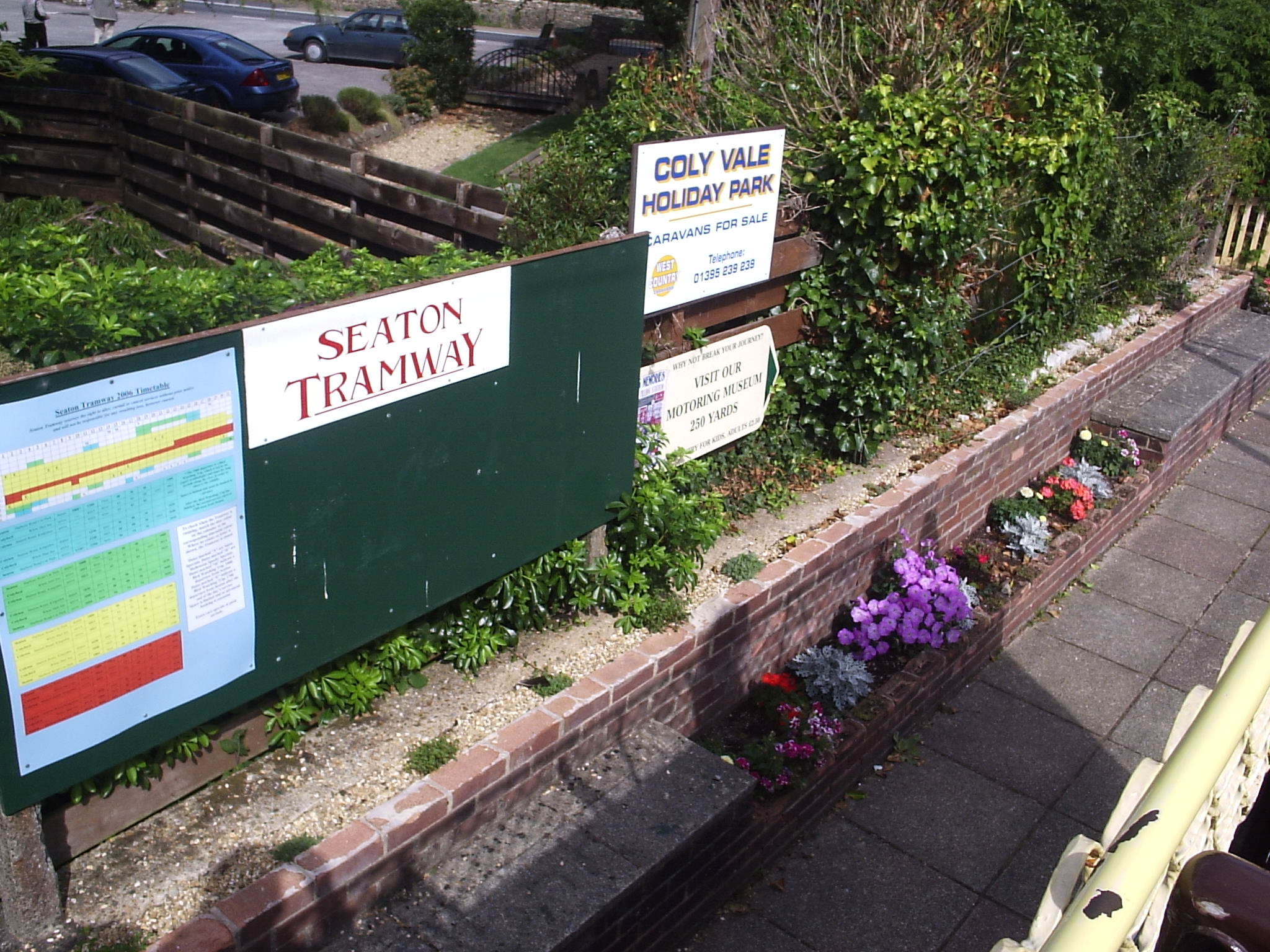
Colyford Station
