= Grade I listed buildings in East Devon =

East Devon shown in Devon

There are over 9,000 Grade I listed buildings in England. This page is a list of these buildings in the district of East Devon in Devon.

== List ==
Name	Location	Type	Completed (Note: The date given is the date used by Historic England as significant for the initial building or that of an important part in the structure's description.)	Date designated	Grid ref. (Note: The grid reference is based on the British national grid reference system, sometimes known as OSGB36, used by the Ordnance Survey.) Geo-coordinates	Entry number (Note: The "List Entry Number" is a unique number assigned to each listed building and scheduled monument by Historic England.)	Image
Church of St Michael and All Angels	Awliscombe	Parish church	Late 15th/early 16th century	27 January 1989	ST1337701829; 50°48′34″N 3°13′51″W	1098097	Church of St Michael and All Angels More images
Weycroft Hall	Weycroft, Axminster	Manor house	c.1400	6 June 1983	SY3080699851; 50°47′39″N 2°58′59″W	1098625	Upload Photo
Church of St Michael	Axmouth	Parish church	12th century	8 May 1967	SY2563791036; 50°42′51″N 3°03′17″W	1098593	Church of St Michael More images
Stedcombe House	Stedcombe, Axmouth	Country house	c.1697	11 September 1951	SY2641291980; 50°43′22″N 3°02′38″W	1098596	Stedcombe House More images
Palm House including greenhouse to south-east and terrace walls to south-west	Bicton Park, Bicton	Greenhouse	c. 1820–25	10 February 1987	SY0724085997; 50°39′58″N 3°18′50″W	1097548	Palm House including greenhouse to south-east and terrace walls to south-west More images
Rolle Mausoleum including the ruins of the Old Church, adjoining to west	Bicton Park, Bicton	Mausoleum	1850 mausoleum, 15th century church	30 June 1961	SY0726885746; 50°39′50″N 3°18′48″W	1203804	Rolle Mausoleum including the ruins of the Old Church, adjoining to west More images
Church of St Peter	Brampford Speke	Parish church	15th century	30 June 1961	SX9274498237; 50°46′26″N 3°31′21″W	1163855	Church of St Peter More images
Church of St Winifred	Branscombe	Parish church	Early 12th century	22 February 1955	SY1954788462; 50°41′25″N 3°08′25″W	1309398	Church of St Winifred More images
Chapel of the Holy Evangelists	Killerton Park, Broadclyst	Chapel	1840–41	20 May 1985	SS9768100339; 50°47′37″N 3°27′11″W	1098332	Chapel of the Holy Evangelists More images
Church of St John the Baptist	Broadclyst	Parish church	14th century	20 May 1985	SX9817897271; 50°45′58″N 3°26′43″W	1170465	Church of St John the Baptist More images
Church of St Andrew	Broadhembury	Parish church	14th/15th century	22 February 1955	ST1018404708; 50°50′06″N 3°16′37″W	1281269	Church of St Andrew More images
Grange	Broadhembury	Country house	c. early 16th century	27 January 1989	ST0928404212; 50°49′49″N 3°17′22″W	1098064	Grange More images
Church of St Andrew	Clyst Hydon	Parish church	15th century	30 June 1961	ST0354201675; 50°48′24″N 3°22′13″W	1162001	Church of St Andrew More images
Church of St Lawrence	Clyst St Lawrence	Parish church	15th century	30 June 1961	SY0266499975; 50°47′28″N 3°22′56″W	1333709	Church of St Lawrence More images
Church of St Andrew	Colyton	Parish church	15th century	8 May 1967	SY2459994093; 50°44′30″N 3°04′12″W	1306053	Church of St Andrew More images
The Chantry	Combe Raleigh	Chantry house	Late 15th century	22 February 1955	ST1594602372; 50°48′53″N 3°11′40″W	1098020	The Chantry More images
Church of St Mary	Combpyne, Combpyne Rousdon	Parish church	13th century	8 May 1967	SY2901592384; 50°43′36″N 3°00′25″W	1170551	Church of St Mary More images
Church of St Peter	Dalwood	Parish church	15th century	8 May 1967	ST2479000537; 50°47′58″N 3°04′07″W	1170586	Church of St Peter More images
Church of All Saints	East Budleigh	Parish church	15th century	30 June 1961	SY0661884922; 50°39′23″N 3°19′21″W	1204468	Church of All Saints More images
A La Ronde	Withycombe Raleigh, Exmouth	Cottage orné	1798	6 December 1949	SY0048083390; 50°38′30″N 3°24′32″W	1164838	A La Ronde More images
The Manse of the Point in View	Withycombe Raleigh, Exmouth	Manse	1825	15 June 1978	SY0083083523; 50°38′35″N 3°24′14″W	1103806	The Manse of the Point in View More images
The Point in View	Withycombe Raleigh, Exmouth	Chapel, school and almshouses	1811	6 December 1949	SY0078883506; 50°38′34″N 3°24′16″W	1164937	The Point in View More images
Church of St Michael	Gittisham	Parish church	Possibly 14th century	22 February 1955	SY1337398366; 50°46′42″N 3°13′48″W	1097994	Church of St Michael More images
Combe House	Combe, Gittisham	House	17th century	22 February 1955	SY1427397863; 50°46′26″N 3°13′02″W	1098026	Combe House More images
Church of St John the Baptist	Hawkchurch	Parish church	12th century	8 May 1967	ST3431500414; 50°47′58″N 2°56′00″W	1098492	Church of St John the Baptist More images
Church of St Mary	Luppitt	Parish church	Late 13th/early 14th century	22 February 1955	ST1690406758; 50°51′16″N 3°10′55″W	1307043	Church of St Mary More images
Church of St John the Baptist	Membury	Parish church	12th century	8 May 1967	ST2762702941; 50°49′17″N 3°01′44″W	1170817	Church of St John the Baptist More images
Church of St Michael	Musbury	Parish church	15th century	8 May 1967	SY2756494564; 50°44′46″N 3°01′41″W	1333564	Church of St Michael More images
Church of St John the Baptist	Nether Exe	Parish church	Late 15th century	30 June 1961	SX9312699830; 50°47′17″N 3°31′03″W	1097624	Church of St John the Baptist More images
Church of the Blessed Virgin Mary	Offwell	Parish church	13th century	22 February 1955	SY1948599575; 50°47′24″N 3°08′37″W	1104090	Church of the Blessed Virgin Mary More images
Cadhay	Ottery St Mary	House	16th century	28 April 1952	SY0893796238; 50°45′31″N 3°17′33″W	1289400	Cadhay More images
Church of St Mary	Ottery St. Mary	Church	1260	28 April 1952	SY0985895567; 50°45′10″N 3°16′45″W	1212599	Church of St Mary More images
Knightstone	Wiggaton, Ottery St Mary	Country house	16th century	28 April 1952	SY1072194156; 50°44′24″N 3°16′00″W	1213714	Knightstone More images
Church of St Mary	Payhembury	Parish church	Early 16th century	22 February 1955	ST0886801793; 50°48′31″N 3°17′41″W	1333739	Church of St Mary More images
Church of St John the Baptist	Plymtree	Parish church	15th century	22 February 1955	ST0518102908; 50°49′05″N 3°20′51″W	1333727	Church of St John the Baptist More images
Church of St Mary	Poltimore	Parish church	Late 15th century	30 June 1961	SX9659696831; 50°45′43″N 3°28′03″W	1333257	Church of St Mary More images
Church of St Mary	Rewe	Parish church	15th century	30 June 1961	SX9456399222; 50°46′59″N 3°29′49″W	1305699	Church of St Mary More images
Rockbeare Manor Including Terraces Adjoining to South	Rockbeare	Country house	Mid-18th century	11 November 1952	SY0316294044; 50°44′16″N 3°22′25″W	1203803	Rockbeare Manor Including Terraces Adjoining to South More images
Church of St Gregory	Seaton	Parish church	Early 14th century	2 October 1951	SY2471590576; 50°42′36″N 3°04′03″W	1164812	Church of St Gregory More images
Gate House at Old Shute House Including Flanking Walls and Pavilions	Shute	Gatehouse	c. 1570 or earlier 16th century	8 May 1967	SY2521497494; 50°46′20″N 3°03′43″W	1098437	Gate House at Old Shute House Including Flanking Walls and Pavilions More images
Old Shute House	Shute	Manor house	c. 1380	14 December 1955	SY2524497412; 50°46′17″N 3°03′41″W	1171033	Old Shute House More images
Church of St Giles and St Peter	Sidbury, Sidmouth	Church	12th century	12 October 1951	SY1397091749; 50°43′08″N 3°13′12″W	1216540	Church of St Giles and St Peter More images
Royal Glen Hotel	Sidmouth	House	m.SubMatches(0) 1820	12 October 1951	SY1216387222; 50°40′41″N 3°14′40″W	1097909	Royal Glen Hotel More images
The Old Chancel	Sidmouth	House	1864	12 October 1951	SY1246787484; 50°40′49″N 3°14′25″W	1289171	The Old Chancel More images
Bishop's Court	Sowton	Country house	1860–64	11 November 1952	SX9807891904; 50°43′04″N 3°26′42″W	1097577	Bishop's Court More images
Church of St Michael and All Angels	Sowton	Parish church	1844–45	19 March 1987	SX9758792513; 50°43′23″N 3°27′08″W	1334001	Church of St Michael and All Angels More images
Stable Block Adjoining Tithe Barn to North-north-west	Sowton	Stable	Early 16th century	19 March 1987	SX9815091812; 50°43′01″N 3°26′39″W	1333998	Upload Photo
Tithe Barn 150 Metres South-east of Bishop's Court	Sowton	Tithe barn	Probably early 14th century	11 November 1952	SX9813091801; 50°43′01″N 3°26′40″W	1164637	Tithe Barn 150 Metres South-east of Bishop's Court
Church of St Michael	Stockland	Parish church	13th century	8 May 1967	ST2446104528; 50°50′07″N 3°04′27″W	1098406	Church of St Michael More images
Church of St Mary Magdalene	Stoke Canon	Parish church	Late 15th century	30 June 1961	SX9395698016; 50°46′19″N 3°30′19″W	1333984	Church of St Mary Magdalene More images
Church of St James	Talaton	Parish church	15th century	22 February 1955	SY0674599734; 50°47′23″N 3°19′28″W	1098109	Church of St James More images
Church of Our Lady	Upton Pyne	Parish church	15th century	30 June 1961	SX9101997708; 50°46′07″N 3°32′48″W	1334009	Church of Our Lady More images
Church of St Swithun	Woodbury	Parish church	1409	30 June 1961	SY0093887191; 50°40′33″N 3°24′12″W	1104176	Church of St Swithun More images
Church of St John the Baptist	Yarcombe	Parish church	15th century	22 February 1955	ST2455408195; 50°52′06″N 3°04′25″W	1098193	Church of St John the Baptist More images

== See also ==
- Grade II* listed buildings in East Devon
