= Philip Brannon =

Philip Brannon (born 27 February 1817: Newport, Isle of Wight – died 11 June 1890: London) was a British artist, engraver, writer, printer, architect and civil engineer. In the 1850s he wrote and illustrated various guidebooks to Southampton, Bournemouth and other south coast places. He designed the Church of the Saviour in Southampton (1859), and the concrete Axmouth Old Bridge (1877) which pioneered the use of the material. He was granted patents relating to the use of concrete in building design, and also for “navigable balloons”, of which he was a keen advocate.

== Early life ==
As a young man, Brannon worked with his father, George Brannon (1784-1860), a printer, engraver and publisher, originally from Antrim in Ireland. George Brannon was the author and publisher of Vectis scenery, an illustrated guide to the Isle of Wight first published in 1821, which was reissued and adapted many times during the following decades. Philip Brannon contributed some engravings to later editions. He was active in the Ragged School movement and in the cause of Chartism on the island, retaining his left-leaning sympathies in later life (he campaigned for the Liberal interest while living in Southampton).

In the mid-1840s he married and moved to Southampton, where he set up as a printer, engraver, publisher and jobbing artist. As well as illustrating his own publications, he collaborated on a geological textbook, a book of maritime charts, a description of the Great Exhibition and a work on the design of shop fronts. He exhibited a series of watercolours depicting aerial views of Southampton in Roman, Tudor and modern times in 1856.

== Author and publisher ==
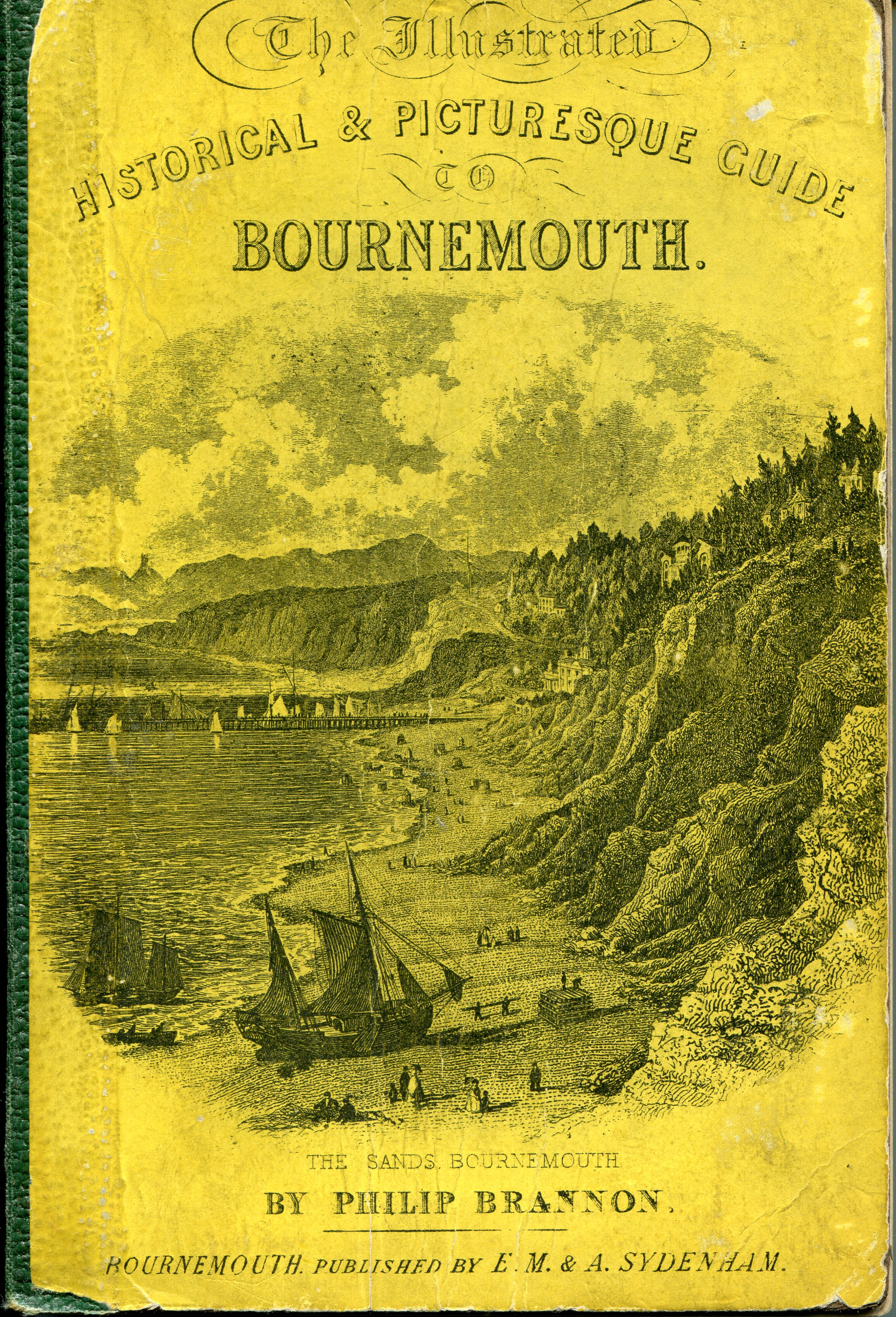
An 1870 edition of Philip Brannon's Bournemouth guidebook (cover)

In 1850 Brannon published The Picture of Southampton, a guide to the town which he wrote and illustrated. This work, later entitled The stranger's guide and pleasure visitor's companion to Southampton and the surrounding country, went through more than twenty editions by the early 1870s. It provides a comprehensive survey of the town at the point of its transition from a spa resort to a major commercial port, and makes a plea for the conservation of historic architectural features, notably the old town walls, which were then under threat from development.

In the same year, he published a companion work, The stranger's guide and pleasure visitor's companion to Netley Abbey, a description of the ruined Cistercian monastery at Netley near Southampton.

Brannon then turned his attention to the nearby seaside resort of Bournemouth. His Illustrated historical and picturesque guide to Bournemouth, issued in 1855, was soon expanded to include the nearby towns of Poole and Swanage (1856–58). The Bournemouth guide was the first substantial guidebook to the town: a 19th edition was published as Sydenham's Illustrated, Historical and Descriptive Guide to Bournemouth and surrounding district in 1893, although by that time it had been much revised and Brannon was no longer acknowledged as the author.

Other topographical publications followed in the 1860s: The illustrated historical and picturesque guide to Corfe Castle, Wareham, and the antiquities of the Isle of Purbeck (1860); Sea coast retirement at West Lulworth, East Lulworth and Kimmeridge, Dorsetshire (1864); and untitled collections of engravings illustrating the geology and coastal scenery of Dorset. Brannon’s illustrations were also reproduced in various forms as tourist souvenirs.

== Architect and civil engineer ==
Although Brannon had no formal qualifications, towards the end of the 1850s he began advertising his services as an architect and civil engineer. In 1858 he was reported in the press as one of three prizewinners in a competition to design Trinity Church, Edinburgh. Also at that time he was engaged by the Unitarian church, of which he was a member, to design the Church of the Saviour in London Road, Southampton. The church, in the Gothic style, was completed in 1860; it was destroyed by bombing in World War 2

During the 1850s Brannon developed several abortive schemes for public buildings in Southampton. He also tried and failed to interest the Poole municipal authorities in a proposal for the redevelopment of the harbour, which included new docks and a massive breakwater at the harbour entrance to prevent silting.

In 1862 Brannon was declared bankrupt, but was discharged later in the year. The following year he was appointed Surveyor and Inspector of Nuisances by the Local Board of Health of the town of Shanklin, Isle of Wight. Speculative schemes for developing land in the neighbourhood led to a second bankruptcy in 1869, from which he was again discharged in 1870.

Brannon then relocated to London, emerging as an active promoter of the use of reinforced concrete in construction, for fireproofing and other purposes. In 1872 he received approval from the Metropolitan Board of Works to build ‘monolithic fireproof buildings’ in Islington, London. Some of these collapsed in 1874 owing to faulty construction.

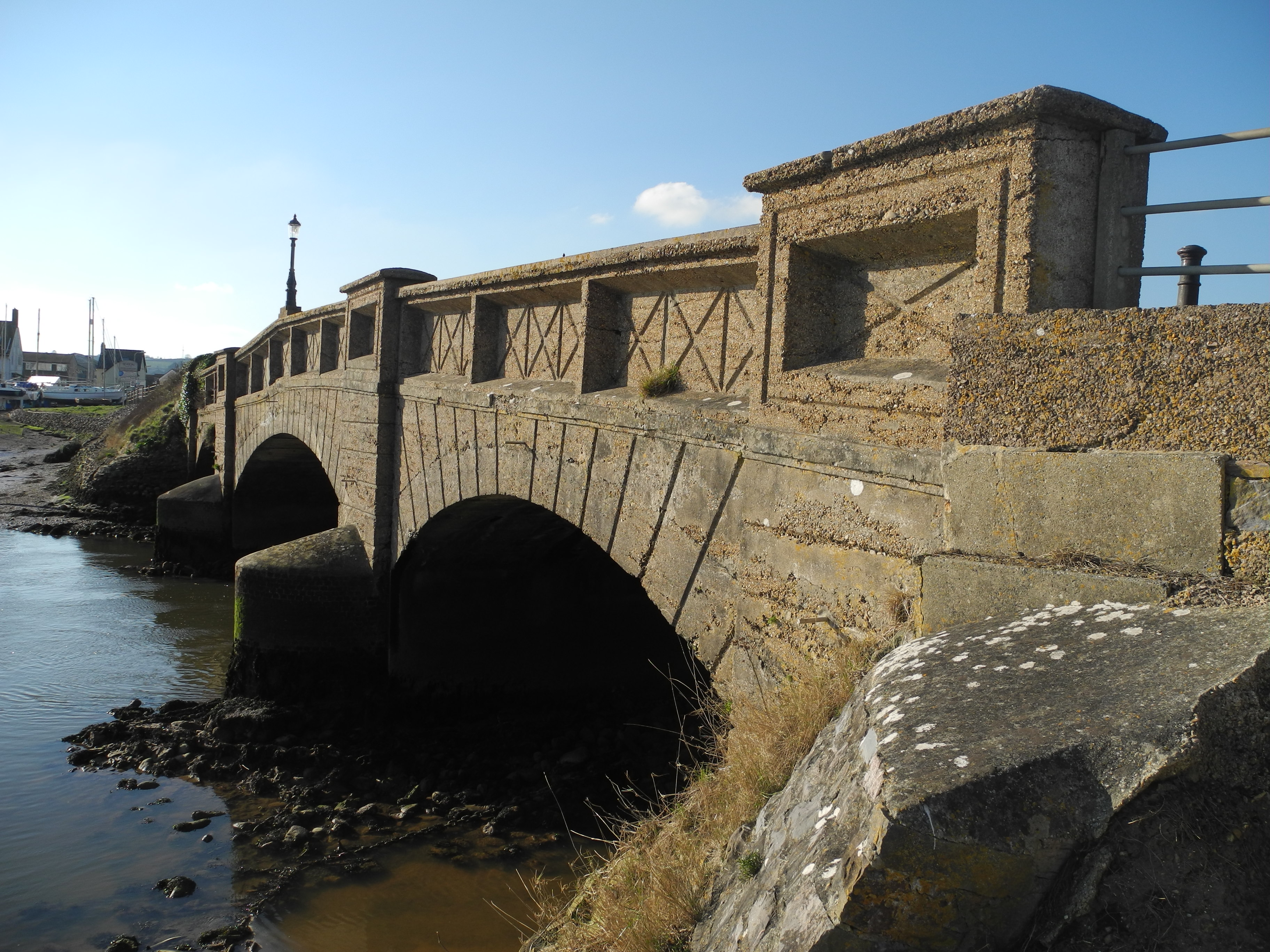
Axmouth Old Bridge

Brannon went on to design a concrete road bridge and toll house over the River Axe at Axmouth in Devon, which was funded by the Seaton and Beer Railway Company. Now known as Axmouth Old Bridge, the three-span structure, which opened in 1877, was the second concrete bridge to be built in Britain, and is the oldest still standing. It is made of mass concrete without reinforcement, although in 1956 steel relieving beams were added to counteract the weakness of the central span under traffic loads. An adjacent road bridge has superseded it, but it survives for use by foot traffic as part of the South West Coast Path. It is a Grade II listed Ancient Monument. The toll house also still stands and is used as a private dwelling.

In 1882 Brannon moved to Walton-on-the-Naze, Essex, where he was the architect and civil engineer for the Naze Park Estate development, as well as manager of the Port Walton Brick and Tile Company. Here he was responsible for building a large private house on the cliffs, originally called Highcliff House, and other residential properties.

== Innovator ==
Between 1870 and 1874, Brannon was granted a number of patents relating to novel construction techniques for buildings, roads, furniture and ships. In the latter year he was busy promoting the use of his patent monolithic concrete construction method, to which end he published his Conspectus of domal sanitation and co-founded the Monolithic Fireproof and Sanitary Construction Works Ltd.

Brannon's first patent, granted in 1870, was for the construction of navigable balloons. Brannon was an enthusiast for powered flight, advocating the use of dirigible balloons to relieve the siege of Paris in 1870 during the Franco-Prussian War. In 1879 he published The Air-boat for arcustatic air-travel to advertise more widely his concept of the Arcustat, a dirigible airship which used a novel form of jet propulsion and was not reliant on gas or hot air for buoyancy. He sought in vain to interest the Royal Aeronautical Society in the design, which failed to reach the prototype stage.

== Personal life ==
Brannon married Emma Kemp at Newport, Isle of Wight, in 1845. After Emma's death in 1852, he married her cousin, Emma Mary Pedder, at Southampton in 1853.

== Publications ==
Philip Brannon was the author and illustrator of the following works:

- The Picture of Southampton. Southampton, [1850]. (Later editions published as The stranger's guide and pleasure visitor's companion to Southampton and the surrounding country.)
- The stranger's guide and pleasure visitor's companion to Netley Abbey. Southampton, 1850.
- The illustrated historical and picturesque guide to Bournemouth. Poole, 1855. Later editions published as part of:
- The illustrated historical and picturesque guide to Poole and Bournemouth, and the surrounding country. 3 volumes. Poole, 1856-58.
- The illustrated historical and picturesque guide to Corfe Castle, Wareham, and the antiquities of the Isle of Purbeck. Poole, 1860.
- Sea coast retirement at West Lulworth, East Lulworth and Kimmeridge, Dorsetshire. Poole, [1864].
- Brannon's conspectus of "domal sanitation", or, Life saving and sanitary law and art in houses and other buildings. London, 1874.
- The air-boat for arcustatic air-travel, dispensing with the use of gas, hydrogen, hot or vapour air balloons, and making aero-navigation facile, rapid, safe & certain. London, 1879.
