= Axmouth Old Bridge =

Bridge in Axmouth, Devon, UK

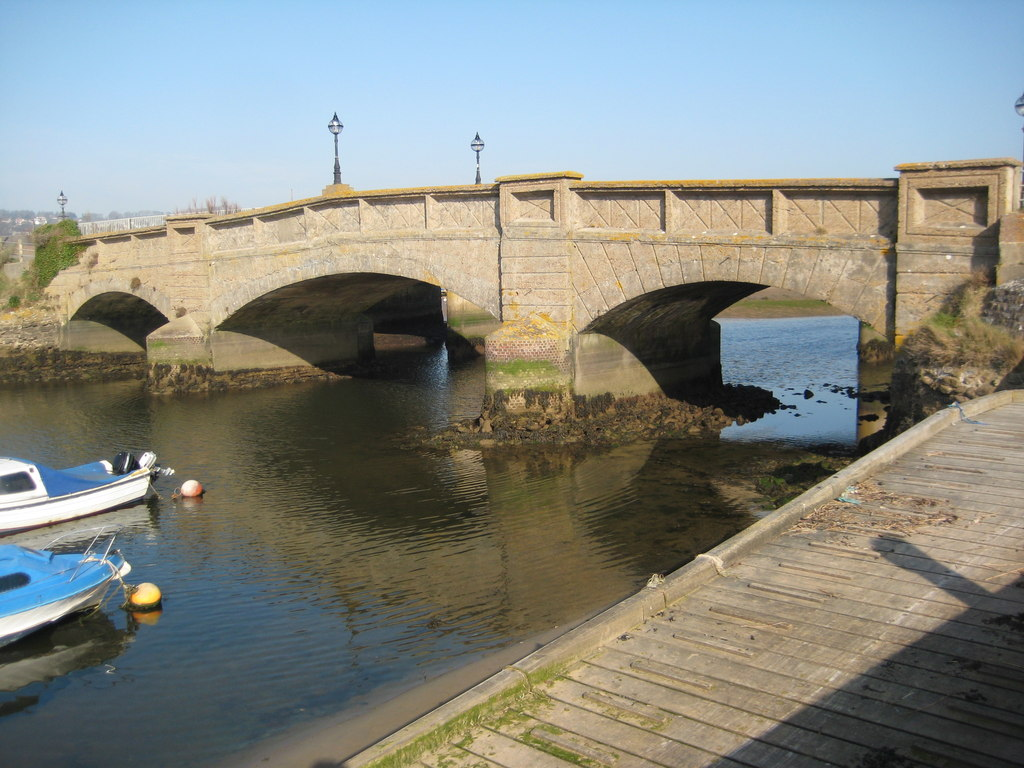
- Axmouth Bridge viewed from seaward
- Coordinates: 50.70466°N 3.05927°W
- Crosses: River Axe
- Locale: Axmouth, Devon, England

Characteristics
- Design: Arch
- Material: Concrete
- No. of spans: 3

History
- Designer: Philip Brannon
- Opened: 1877

Location
- Interactive map of Axmouth Old Bridge

Axmouth Old Bridge is a bridge across the River Axe near its mouth on the south coast of the English county of Devon. It effectively links the village of Axmouth with the seaside town of Seaton, although the whole of the Axe estuary, including both banks and hence the bridge, is within the civil parish of Axmouth. It was built in 1877 and closed to vehicles in 1990, although it is still available to pedestrians and forms part of the route of the South West Coast Path. It is now paralleled by a modern road bridge.

The Seaton and Beer Railway Act 1863 (26 & 27 Vict. c. cxviii) that authorised the construction of the Seaton and Beer Railway also included powers to construct a bridge over the River Axe, giving access to Axmouth from the line's terminus in Seaton. The bridge is a three-span arch bridge and was built in concrete to a design by Philip Brannon. It was initially built of mass concrete without reinforcement, although in 1956 steel relieving beams were added to counteract the weakness of the central span under traffic loads. Including its abutments, the bridge is 53 metres (174 ft) long, and has a 17-metre (56 ft) central span and two 10-metre (33 ft) side spans.

The bridge is believed to be the oldest concrete bridge to survive in England. It is both a scheduled monument, scheduled in 1977, and a grade II* listed building, listed in 1984.

Associated with the bridge, and situated at its west end, is Bridge Cottage, the bridge's former toll house. Built at the same time as the bridge, and also in concrete, this is a grade II listed building in its own right.

== Gallery ==
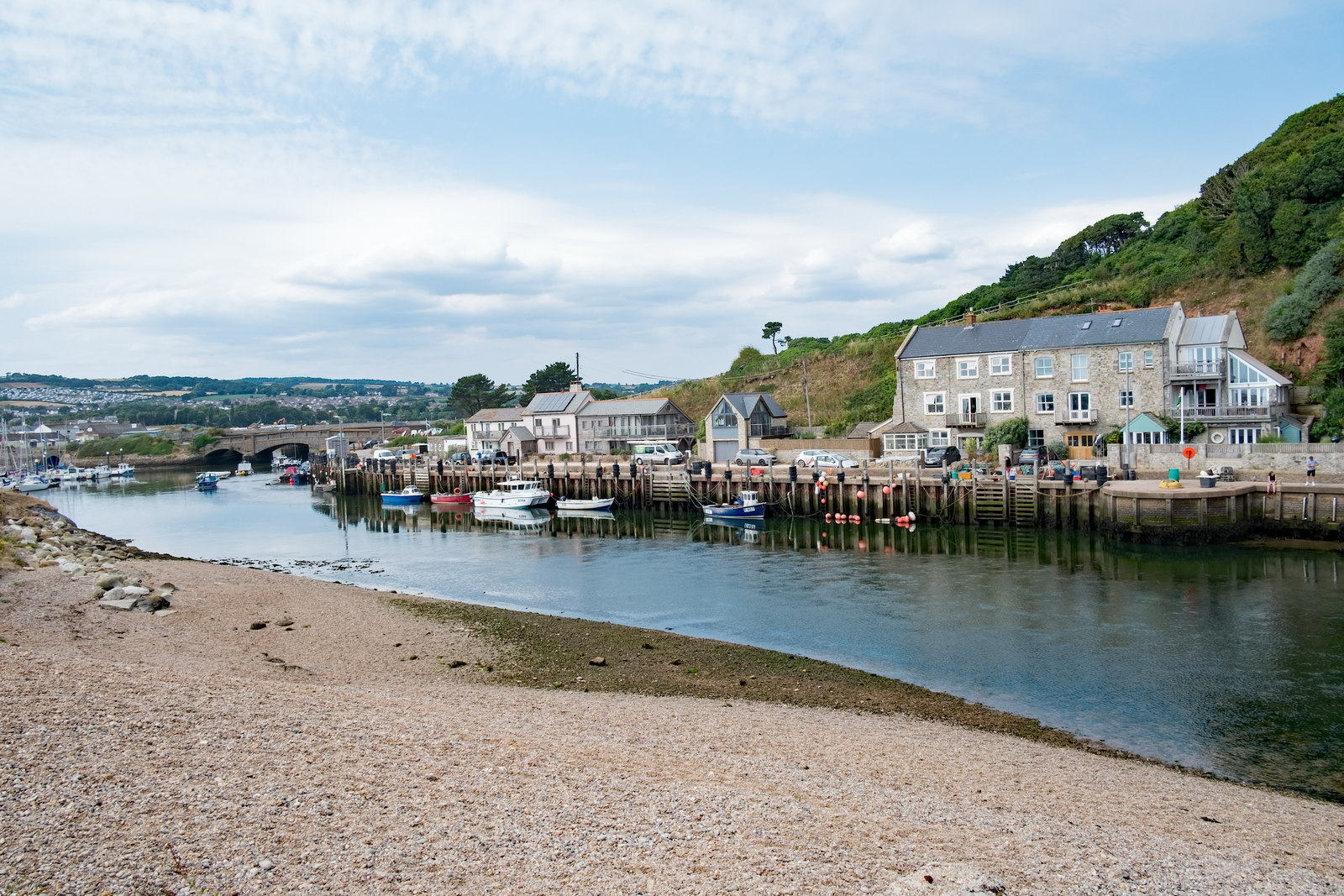
The bridge seen from the harbour

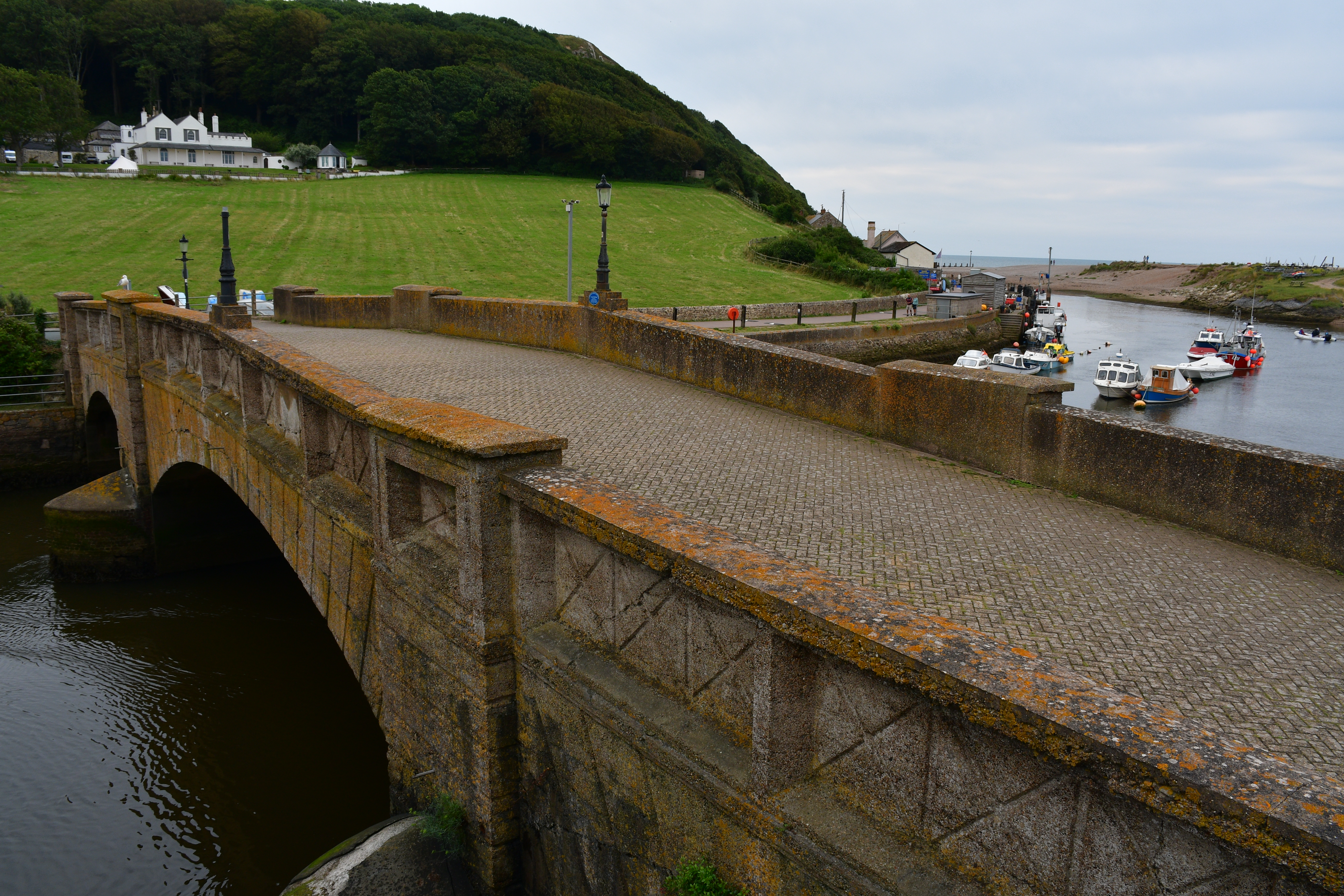
View across the bridge looking to harbour and sea

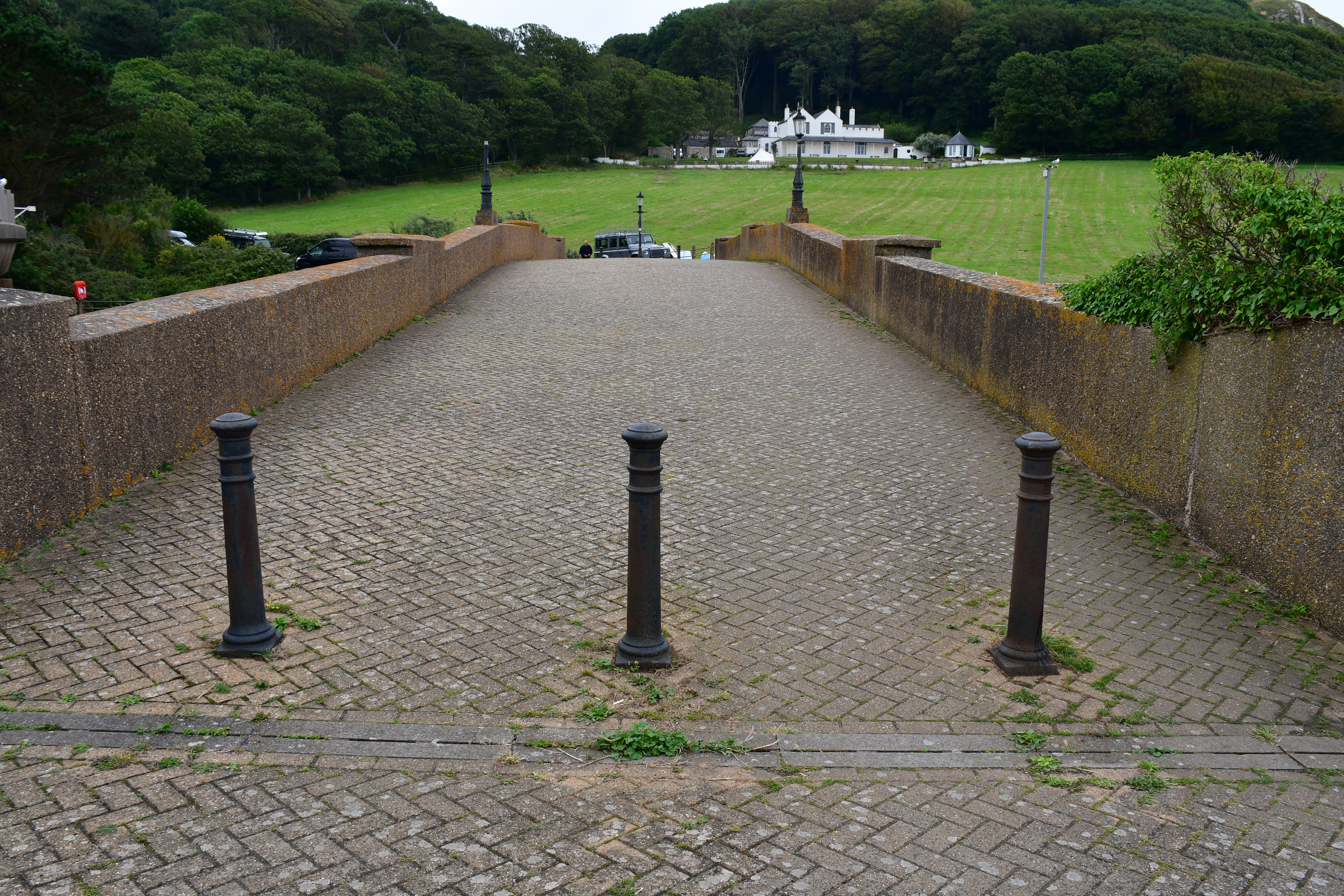
The bridge deck looking towards Haven Cliff House

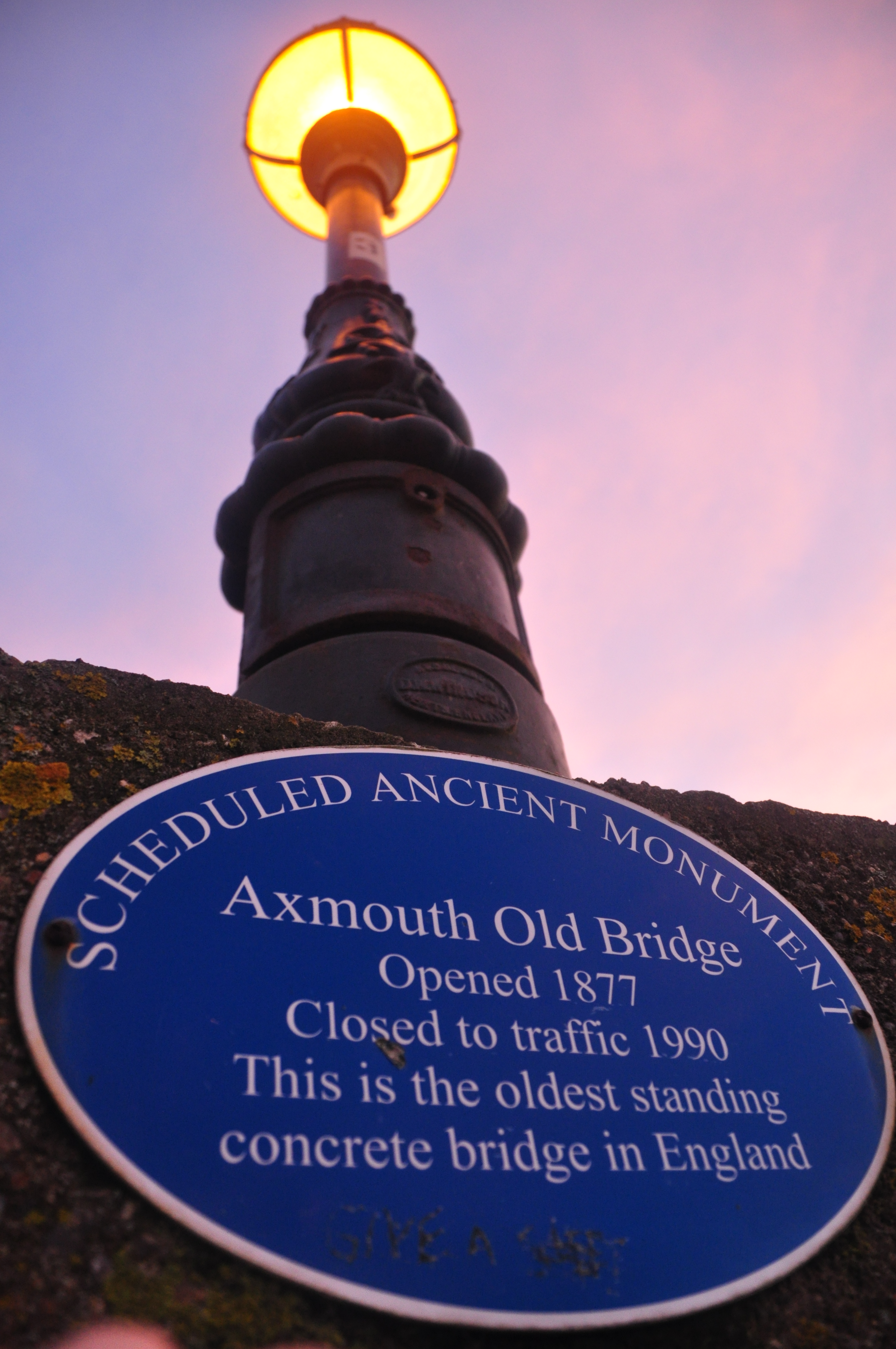
The blue plaque

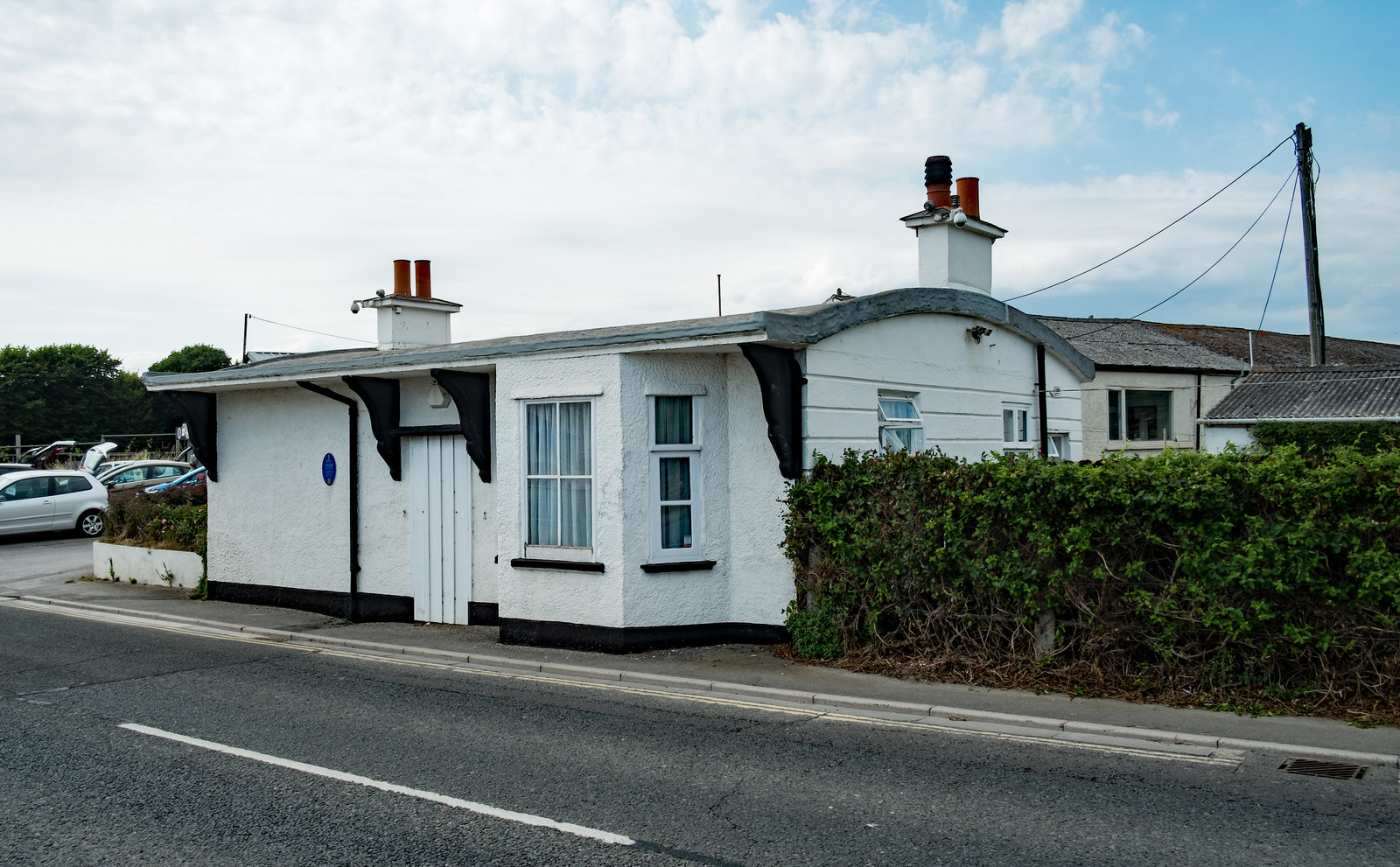
Bridge Cottage, the former toll house
