= Hawkesdown Hill =

Iron Age hill fort in Devon, England

- Hawkesdown Camp
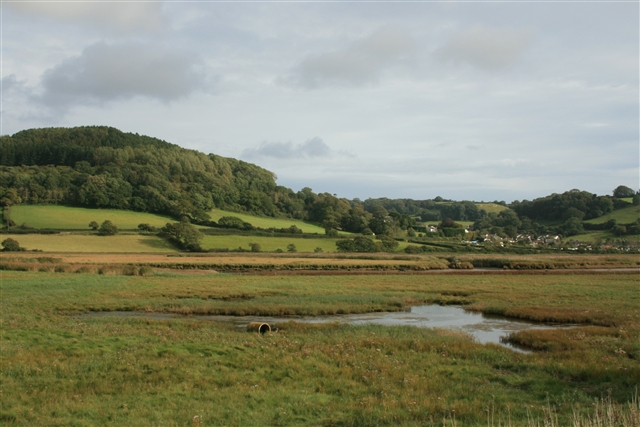
- Hawkesdown Hill and Axmouth

- Location within Devon
- 50.7181°N 3.0439°W
- Periods: Iron Age
- Location: Axmouth, Devon, England

Site notes
- Public access: no

Hawkesdown Hill, also known as Hawkesdown Camp, is an Iron Age Hill fort close to Axmouth in Devon. It is situated on a prominent hillside above the Axe Estuary and is approximately 130 metres (430 ft) above sea level.

== Description ==
The hill fort has a single earthwork boundary enclosing about 2.5 hectares (6.2 acres) with an outwork to the east. The prominent site means that the fort has steep natural defenses on all other sides. The roughly rectangular interior is some 250 metres (820 ft) in length, on an east-west orientation, with a width of some 100 metres (330 ft). The boundary consists of a rampart, which survives in places to a height of 4 metres (13 ft), surrounded by a U-shaped ditch over 2 metres (6 ft 7 in) deep. The outwork lies 100 metres (330 ft) to the east and is 17.8 metres (58 ft) wide and 0.4 metres (1 ft 4 in) high.

Remains found on the site suggest it was subject to an attack by the Romans, although the circumstances are unrecorded, and may simply reflect use of an abandoned site for training purposes.

== Status ==
Hawkesdown Camp was designated as a scheduled monument in 1924, a status it retains. There is no public access to the hill or camp, which forms part of the Bindon estate and is maintained as a pheasant shoot.
