= Parminter =

Parminter is a surname. Notable people with the name include:

- Jane (1750–1811) and Mary Paminter (1767–1849), cousins and British travellers and designers
- Kate Parminter, Baroness Parminter (born 1964), British politician
