= Blackwater River (River Axe) =

River in southwest England

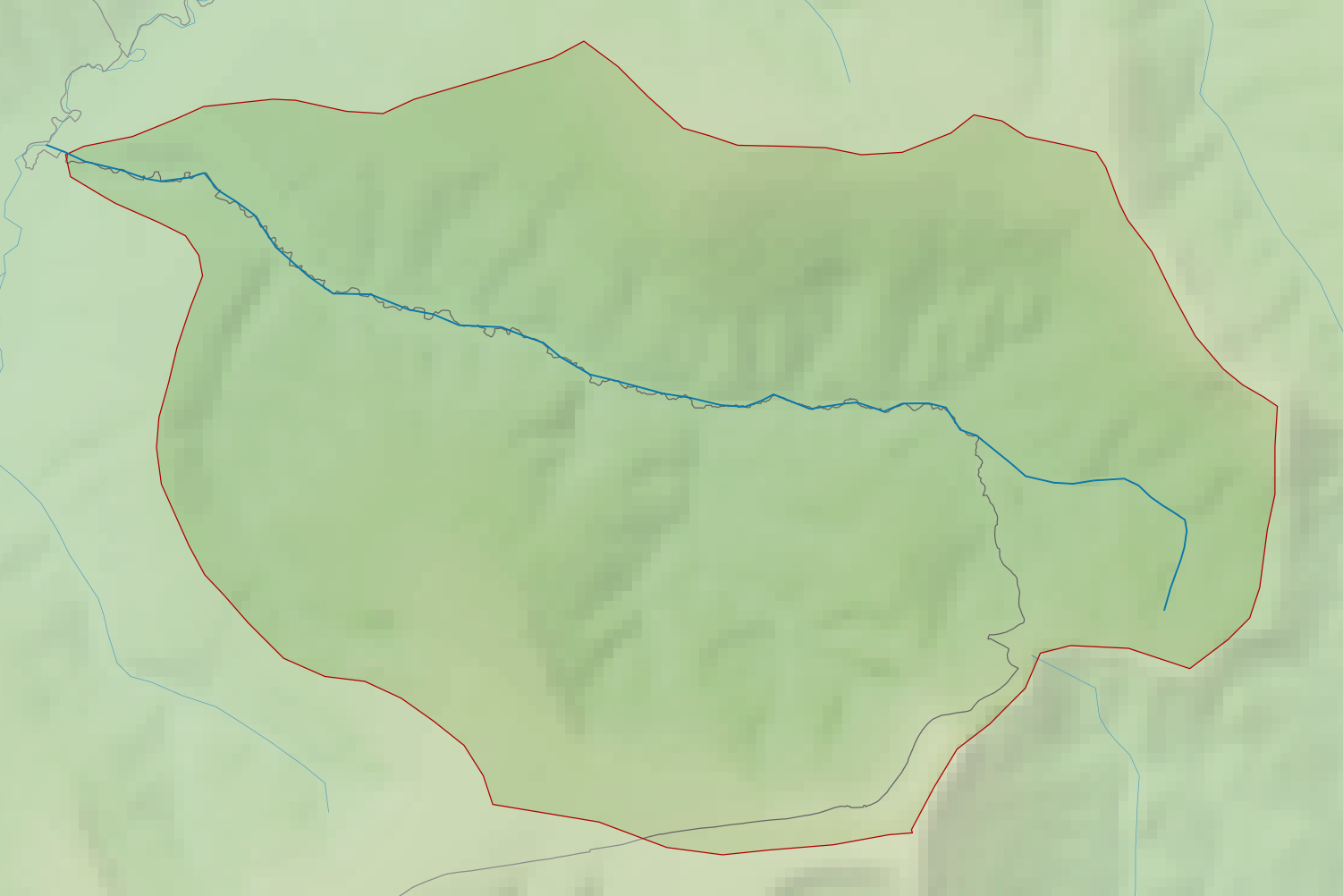
- Course and catchment of the Blackwater River

Location
- Country: England
- Counties: Devon, Dorset

Physical characteristics
- Source
  - location: Marshwood, Dorset
  - coordinates: 50.799500°N 2.874986°W
- Mouth: River Axe
  - coordinates: 50.816404°N 2.959915°W
- Length: 10 km (6.2 mi)

The Blackwater River is a 10-kilometre (6.2 mi) long river in the counties of Dorset and Devon, in the south-west of England. It rises to the north of Marshwood in Dorset, flowing north and west to join the River Axe at a point north of Axminster in Devon. For most of its length it forms the county boundary between Dorset and Devon.
