= Jane and Mary Parminter =

British designers

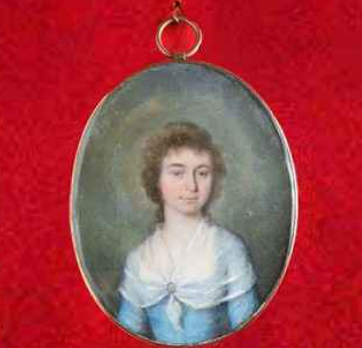
Mary Parminter

Jane Parminter (1750–1811) and Mary Parminter (1767–1849) were cousins and British travellers and designers from Devon who commissioned and were involved in designing the sixteen-sided house named A la Ronde. They also built a chapel, called Point in View, a schoolhouse for local girls and almshouses for local spinster women on the site, and set up wills that passed the properties from women to women.

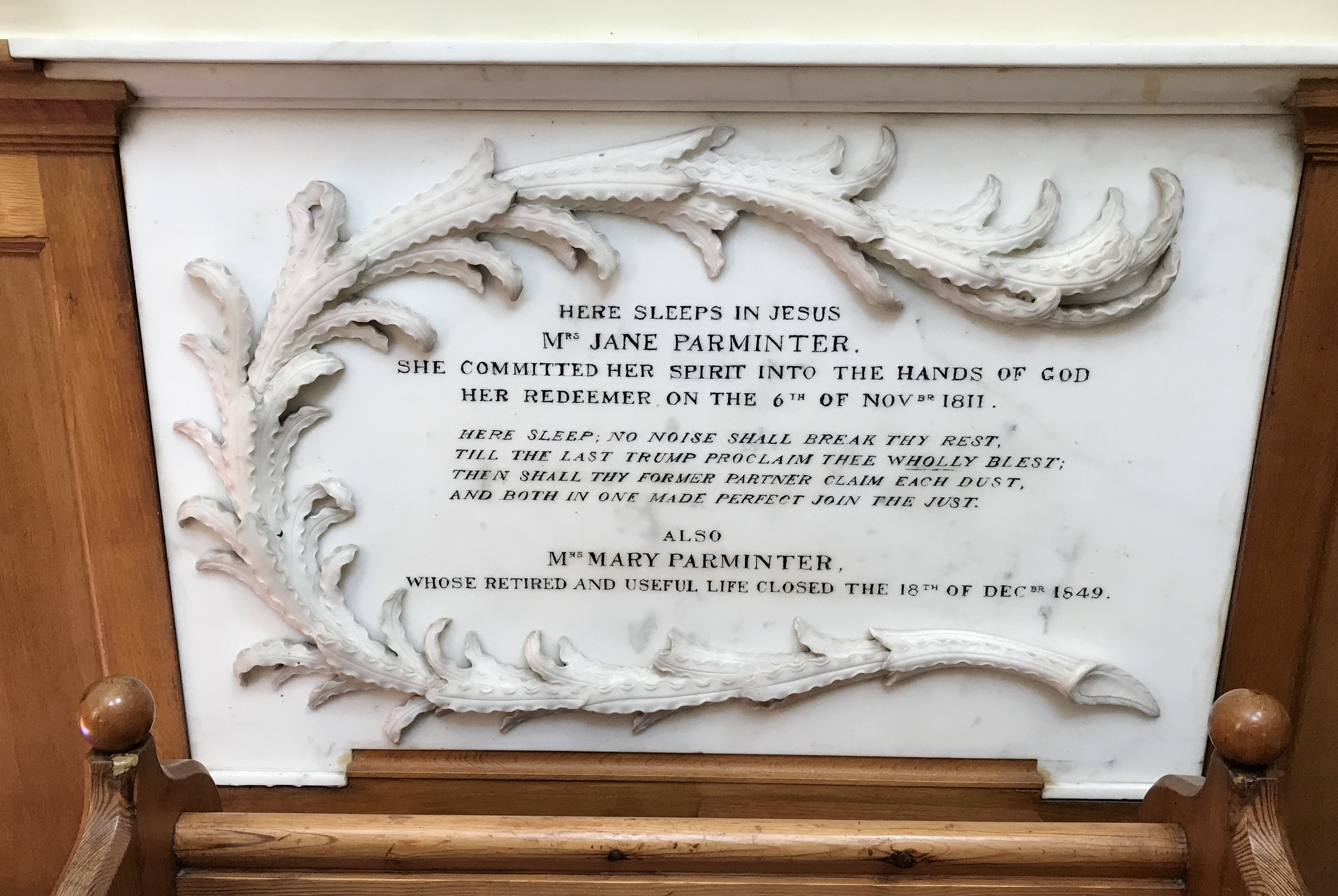
Their grave - A La Ronde plaque

== Early life ==
Jane Parminter was born on 5 February 1750 in Lisbon, Portugal, where her father, a Devon wine merchant, was based. Her mother was Jane Arboyne (or Arbouin) and was of Huguenot descent. She had an elder brother, William, as well as younger siblings: MaryAnne, Elizabeth, Margaret and John. The family were visiting London in 1755 when the Lisbon earthquake destroyed their Portuguese business. Her father returned to Portugal to help rebuild, but the rest of the family moved to Devon. In 1773, the Parminters were living in Braunton when they took in Jane's cousins Mary and Rebecca Parminter. Jane acted as Mary's guardian.

== Travel ==
In 1784, after the death of her father, Jane organised a Grand Tour of Europe for herself, Mary, Elizabeth and Jane Colville. They visited France, Italy, Germany, Switzerland and beyond. Elizabeth had returned to London by 1788, and Jane and Mary followed in 1791 after Elizabeth died. Miss Colville disappears from the records. It was highly unusual in the 18th century for women to undertake the Grand Tour, it being commonly the preserve of rich men. While on their tour, they undertook mountaineering, and became the first women to ascend Mont Buet.

== A la Ronde and its estate ==
Inspired by the chapel of San Vitale in Ravenna, which they had visited on their tour, Jane and Mary had the sixteen-sided A la Ronde built just outside Exmouth in Devon. Family lore suggests Jane designed the building itself but recent research suggests a Mr Lowder may have created the plans based on her ideas.

The interior of the building was decorated by the cousins. It includes the shell gallery, which took the women a decade to complete. The building was designed to house their collection from the Tour. They also laid out the grounds.

In the summer of 1811, the cousins also drew up plans for a small chapel, Point in View, built next to the house, along with almshouses and a school.

The Parminter's work at A la Ronde was featured in an exhibition, Radical Rooms, organised by the Royal Institute of British Architects in 2022. The exhibition examined the role of British women in architecture, focusing on Bess of Hardwick, Patty Hopkins and the Parminters.

== Religious views ==
The Parminter family were active dissenters from the Church of England, worshipping at Meeting Houses instead. Having moved to A La Ronde, the cousins worshipped at the Glenorchy United Reform Church, Exmouth.

Elizabeth and Mary took a keen interest in the conversion of Jews to Christianity. The deeds for the almshouses expressly stated that any Jewess who had embraced Christianity would have preference over all others as a candidate for a place. An apocryphal story popular among Christian Zionists in the 1800s was that Jane Parminter attached a codicil to her will that the oak trees at A la Ronde "shall remain standing and the hand of man shall not be lifted up against them till Israel returns and is restored to the land of promise." This codicil then inspired Lewis Way to fund and re-invigorate the London Society for Promoting Christianity amongst the Jews; Franz Delitzsch would write a pamphlet in 1877 on the Parminters called "The Oaks of A la Ronde". However, a Society investigation in 1882 determined that no such codicil existed in Jane's will. Despite the codicil not existing, the Parminters may well have been like Way in believing that the conversion of the Jews to Christianity and their restoration to Israel were Biblically ordained prophecies and duties for Christian mission. The connection to the oaks is less clear: the Parminters liked their trees and may have talked about them with Way, or it may have been a belief that the timber from the trees would be used to build ships for the return to the promised land.

== Deaths ==
Jane Parminter died in 1811 and was buried in a vault beneath the Point in View chapel that the cousins had built on the site.

After Jane's death, her estate passed to Mary. Mary set up a charity, the Mary Parminter Trust or Point in View Trust, which still runs today. Mary died in 1849 and was buried alongside her cousin. Mary's will stipulated that the house and estate would be passed in sequence to six named, unmarried female relatives.

A la Ronde is run by the National Trust.
