= Stedcombe House =

Country house in Devon, England

Coordinates: 50°43′22″N 3°02′38″W

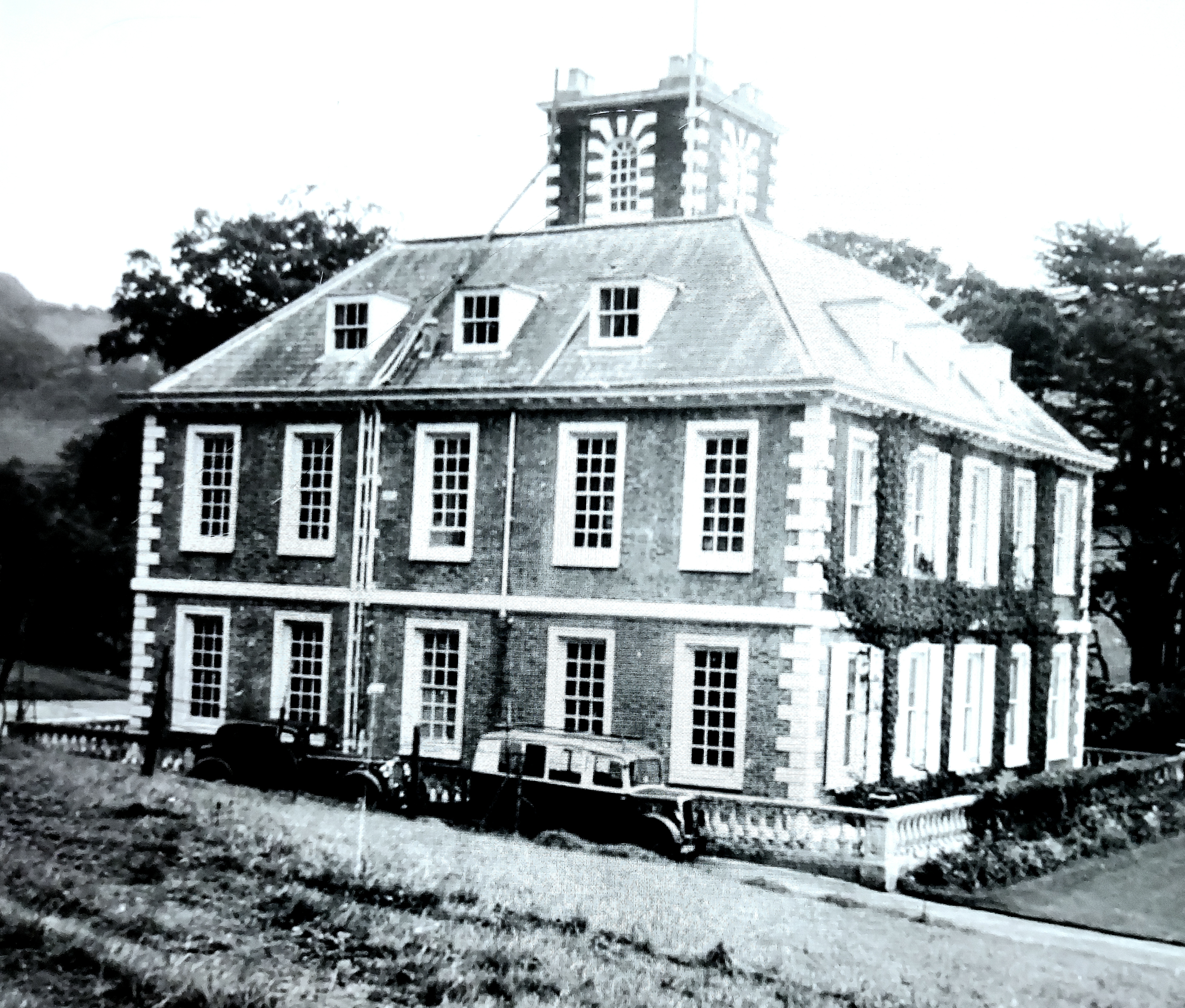
Stedcombe House, in 1949.

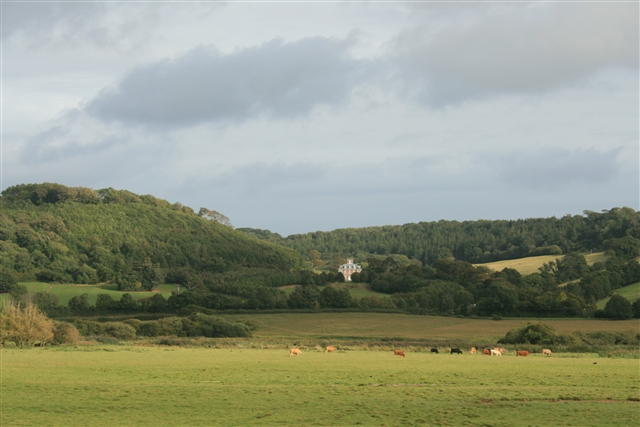
Stedcombe House, as seen from the Seaton Tramway in 2007

Stedcombe House is a country house in the civil parish of Axmouth, in the East Devon district, in the county of Devon, England. It is recorded in the National Heritage List for England as a designated Grade I listed building. Richard Hallet purchased the estate in 1691 from Sir Walter Yonge, and built the house there in 1697.
