= A la Ronde =

Grade I listed building in East Devon, UK

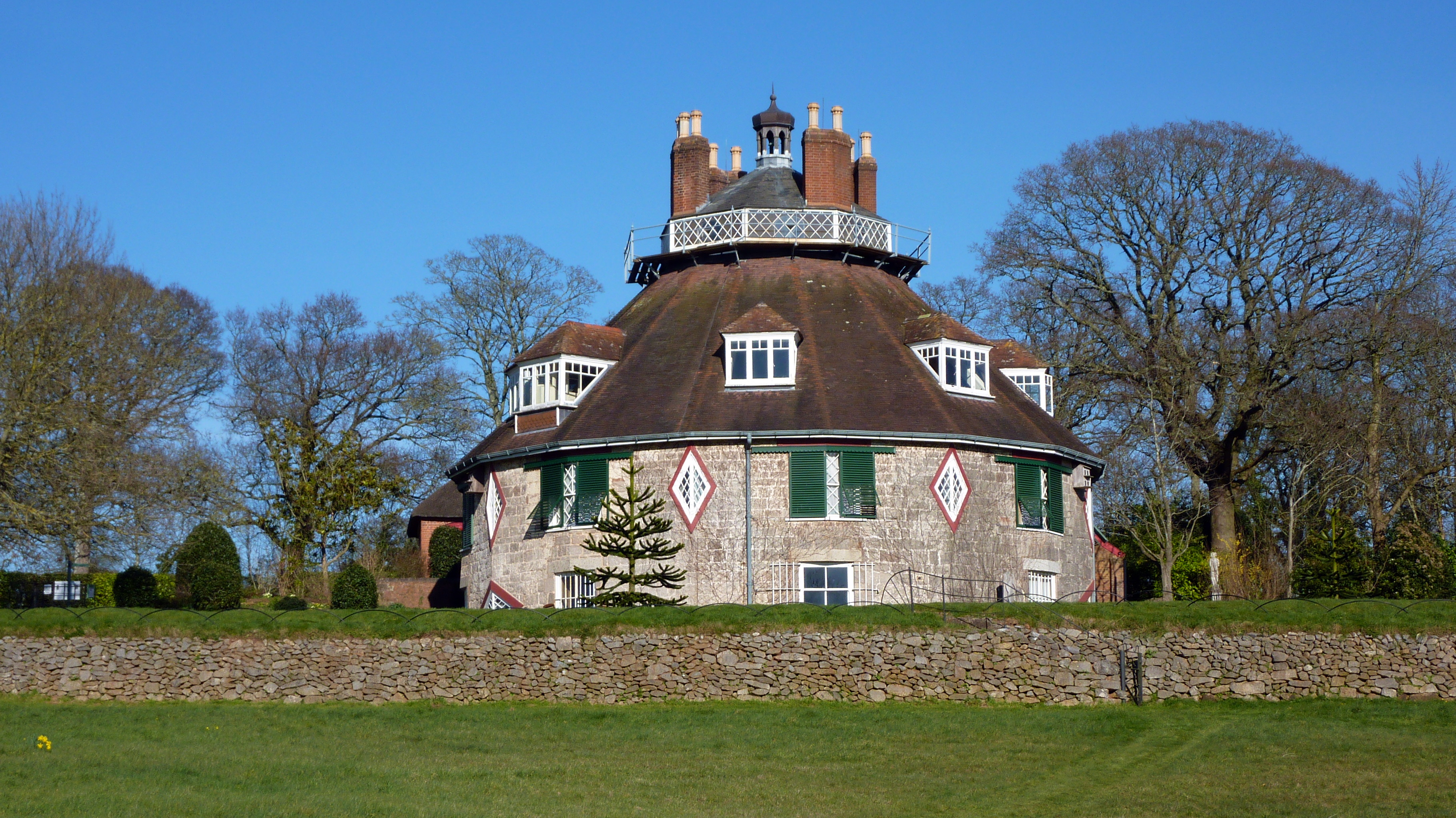

- Location within Devon
- 50°38′30″N 3°24′32″W
- Type: House
- Location: Summer Lane, Exmouth
- OS grid reference: SY 00480 83390

History
- Built: 1796

Site notes
- Area: Devon
- Owner: National Trust

Listed Building – Grade I
- Official name: A la Ronde
- Designated: 6 December 1949
- Reference no.: 1164838

National Register of Historic Parks and Gardens
- Official name: A la Ronde, and The Point-in-View
- Designated: 12 Aug 1987
- Reference no.: 1000686

A la Ronde is an 18th-century, 16-sided cottage orné near Lympstone, Exmouth, Devon, England, in the ownership of the National Trust. The house was built for two spinster cousins, Jane and Mary Parminter. It is a Grade I listed building, as are the adjacent Point-In-View chapel, school and almshouses, together with a manse, which were also built by the cousins. The gardens are Grade II listed in the National Register of Historic Parks and Gardens.

== History ==
The Parminter family, which can be traced back in North Devon as far back as 1600, had acquired considerable wealth as merchants. Jane was the daughter of Barnstaple wine merchant John Parminter who had a business in Lisbon, where she was born in 1750. Jane grew up in London and became guardian to her orphan cousin Mary. On her father's death in 1784, she decided to embark on the Grand Tour accompanied by her invalid sister Elizabeth, her younger orphaned cousin, and a female friend from London.

The two cousins became greatly attached to each other and in 1795 decided to set up home together in Devon. They negotiated the purchase of 15 acres (6.1 ha) of land near Exmouth. Once their house had been built they lived secluded and somewhat eccentric lives for many years until 1811 when Jane died.

The terms of Mary's will specified that the property could be inherited only by "unmarried kinswomen". This condition held firm until, in 1886, the house was transferred to the Reverend Oswald Reichel, a brother of one of the former occupants.

== Designer ==
The design of A la Ronde is supposedly based on the Basilica of San Vitale, in Ravenna, which the two cousins had visited on their Grand Tour. Tradition maintains that the house was designed by Jane herself. It is possible, however, that plans were drawn up based on her ideas by "a Mr. Lowder" mentioned by a 19th-century writer. The sister-in-law of Jane's cousin John, Anne Glass, married a Commander John Lowder, a banker and property developer. Lowder's son, also named John (1781–1829), practised as a gentleman architect in Bath. Although only 17 years of age when A la Ronde was built, it is possible that the younger Lowder designed the house based on Jane's ideas. In 1816, Lowder designed the unusual Bath and District National School (demolished 1896), a 32-sided building with wedge-shaped classrooms. A la Ronde may possibly have served as an early prototype for the larger, later project.

== The building ==
The house was completed in about 1796. The stone-clad building consists of 20 rooms, the ground floor ones radiating out from a 35 feet (10.7 m) high hallway, named "The Octagon", and originally connected by sliding doors. The central lantern extends beyond the steep roof. The lower ground floor housed a wine cellar, strong room and kitchen and an upper octagonal gallery housed an intricate hand-crafted Shell Gallery. The floors are connected by a narrow staircase lined with shells, which Nikolaus Pevsner called "the most extraordinary feature in the house". Between the main rooms were triangular-shaped closets with diamond shaped windows. Much of the internal decoration, including original artworks fashioned from shells, feathers, seaweed, and other components, was produced by the two cousins, whose handicraft skills were excellent. The house also contained many objets d'art brought back by the cousins from their European Tour. Pevsner described the building as "a wholly delightful and unique creation", and the Gallery as "very charming" but "unfortunately badly restored".

In May 2024 the house was featured in the BBC series Hidden Treasures of the National Trust, showing the painstaking restoration of the Shell Gallery. With the conservation completed, the house was visited by Jonathan Harwood who had lived at the house with his mother Ursula Tudor Perkins. She sold the house to the National Trust in the early 1990s after living there for 18 years.

== Gallery ==
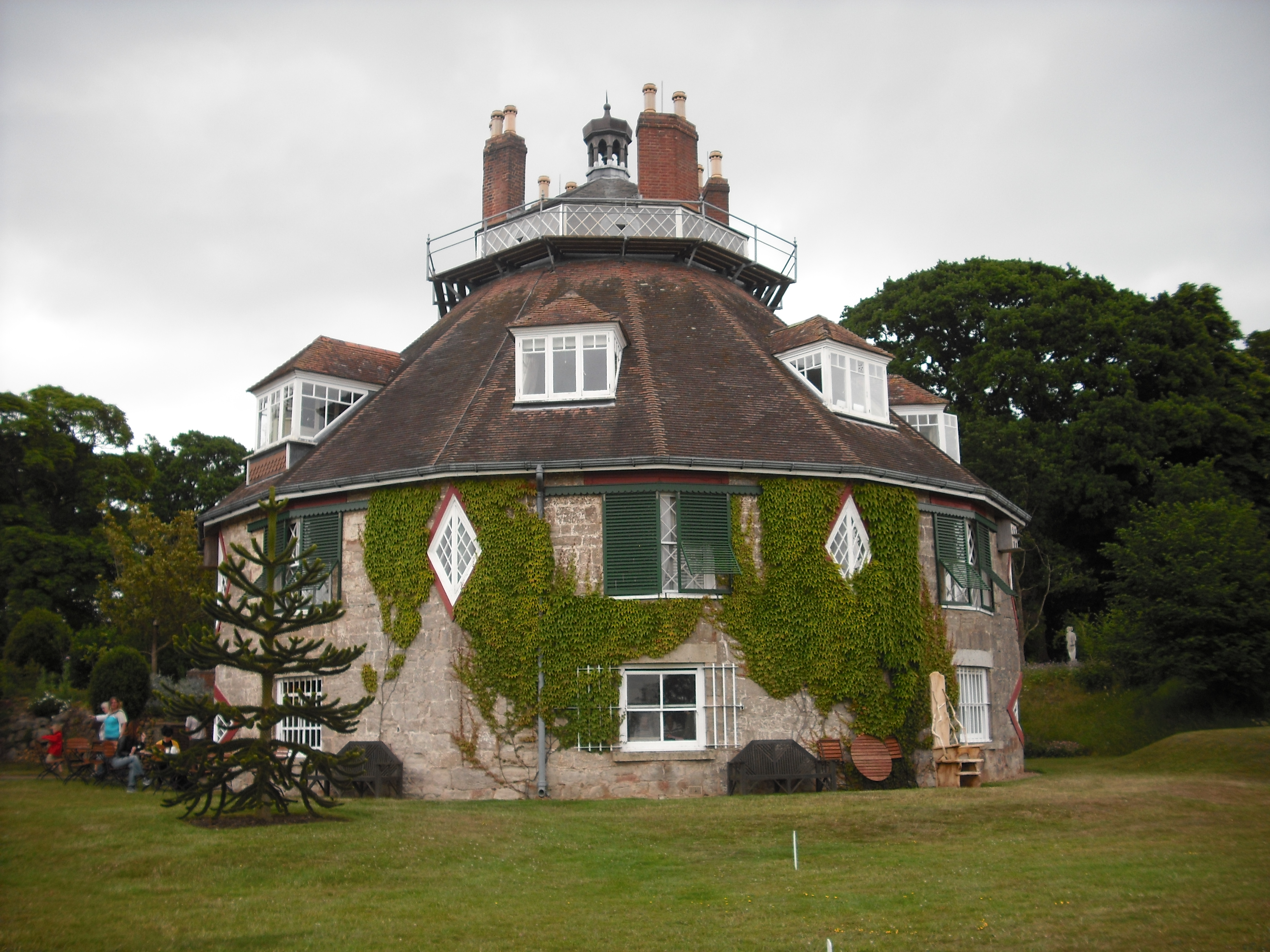
A la Ronde from the south

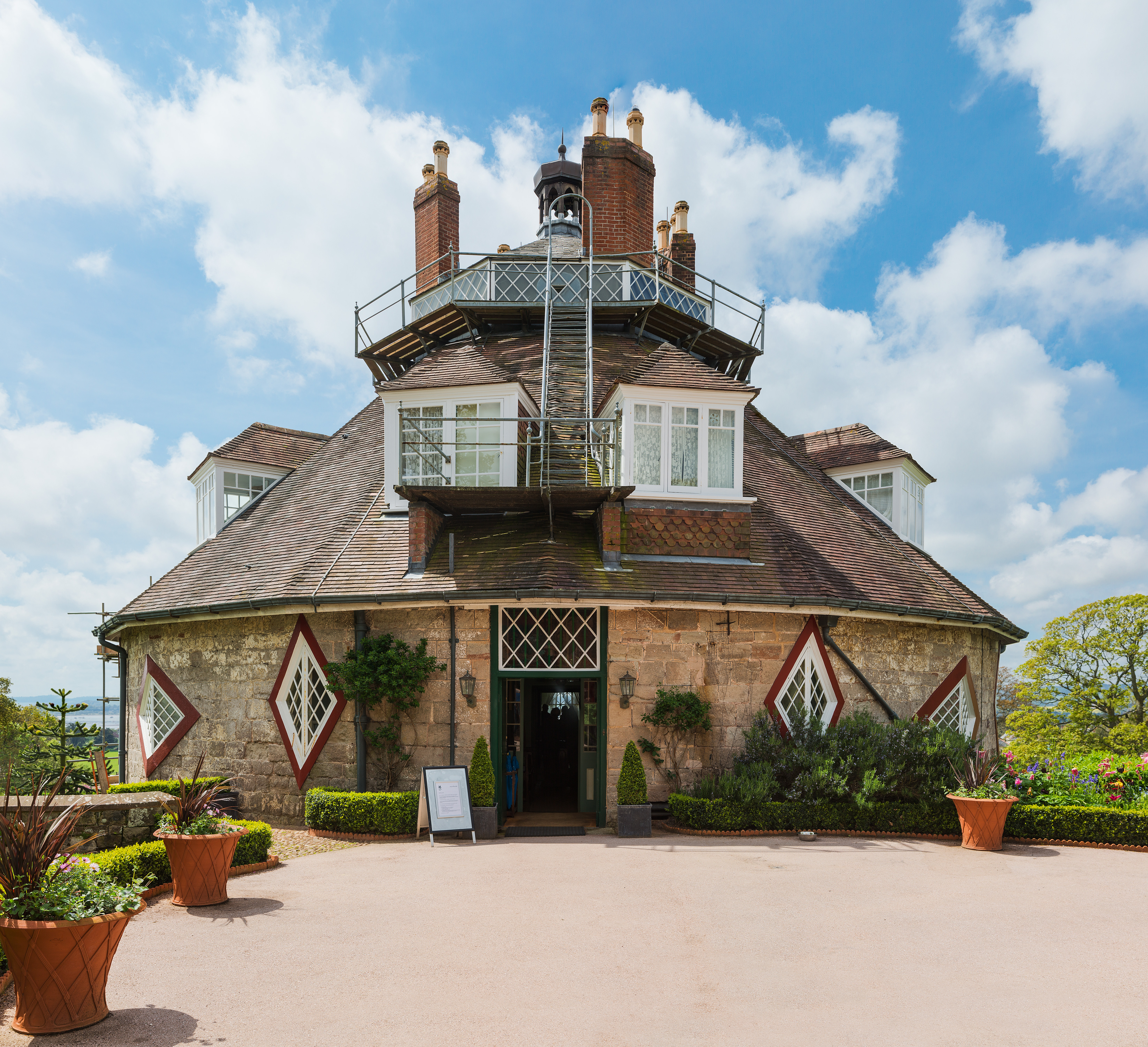
The north-eastern entrance

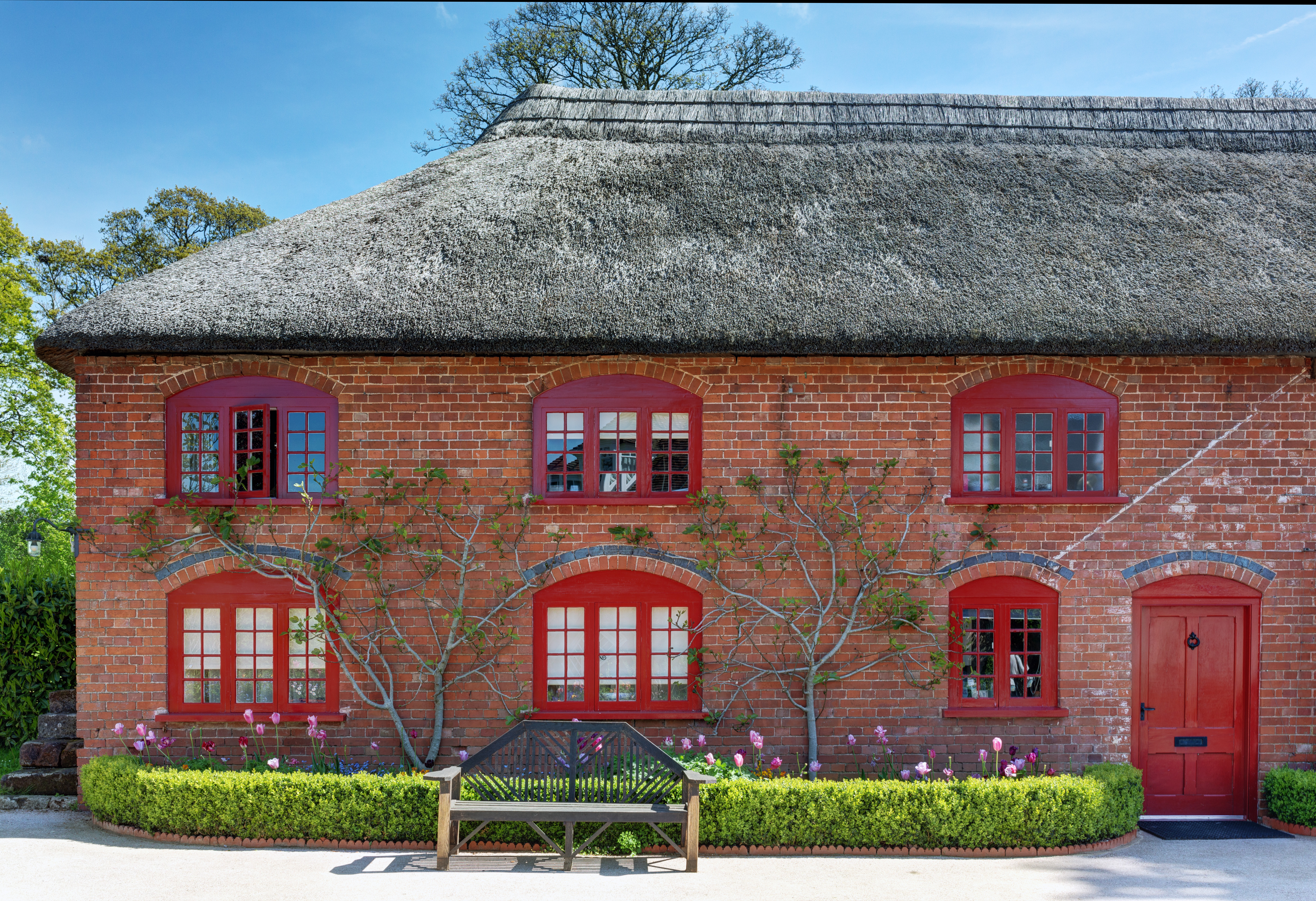
A la Ronde stable, from the south-west

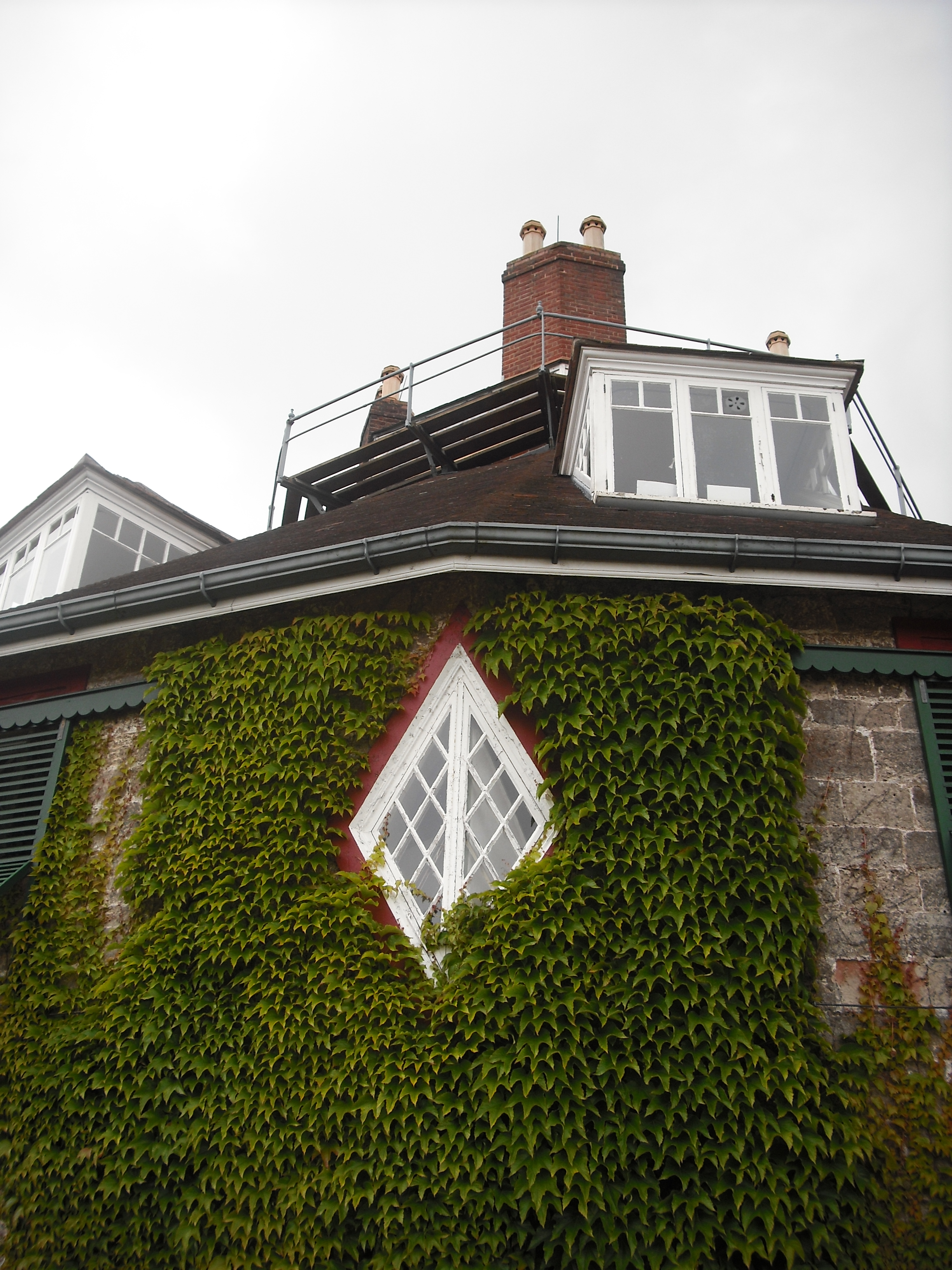
A la Ronde, roof detail

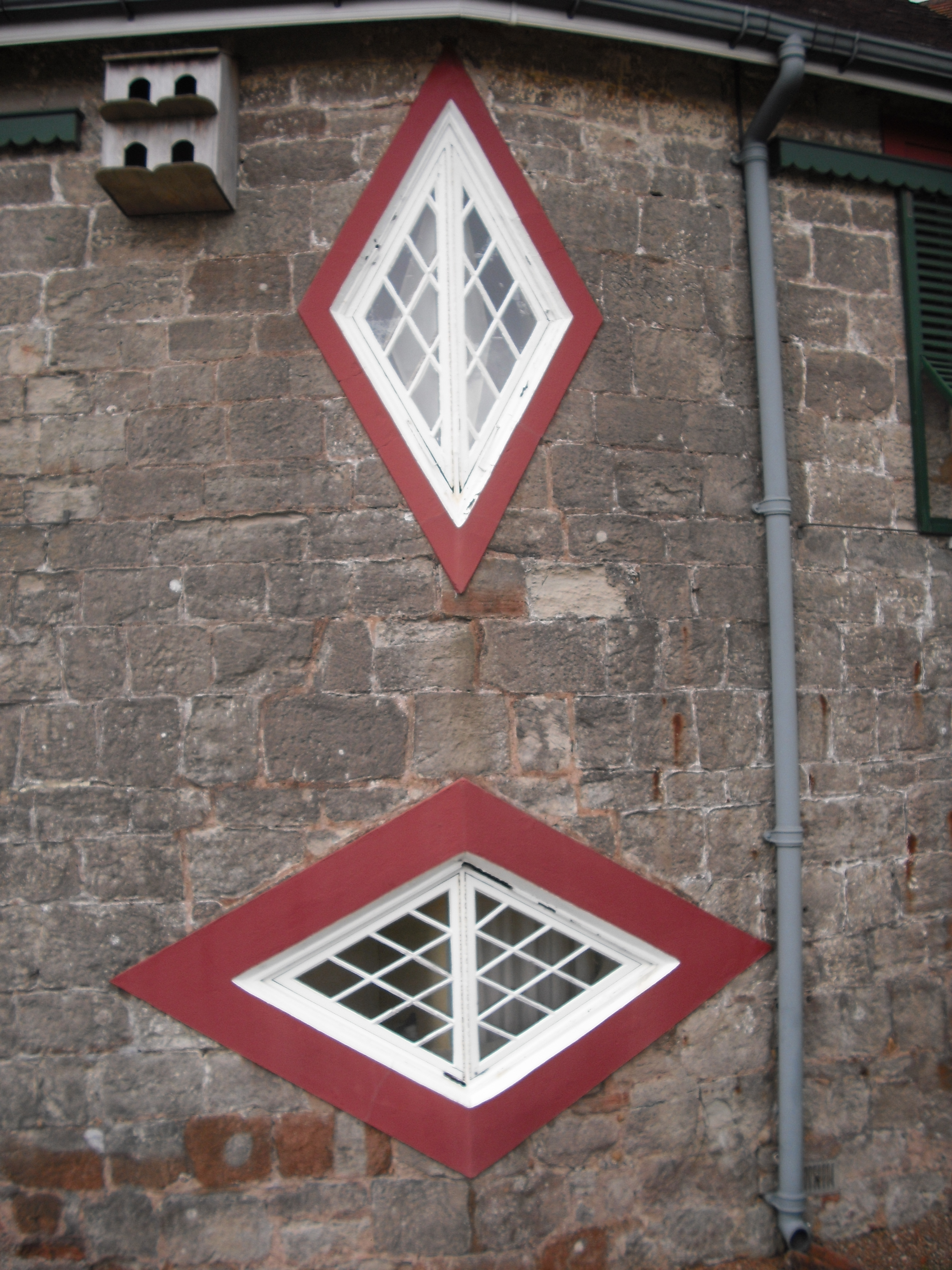
A la Ronde, window detail

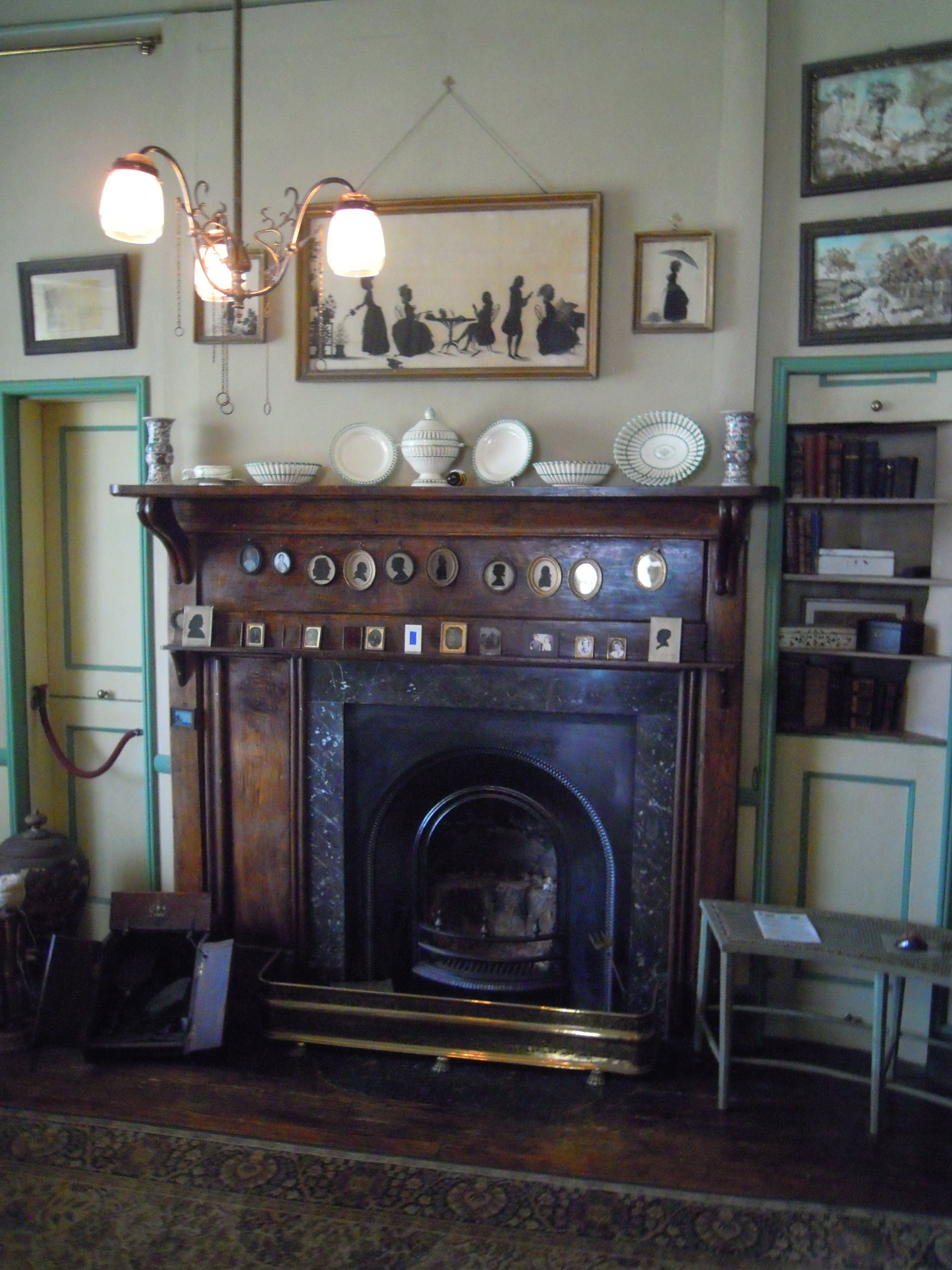
A fireplace in a reception room

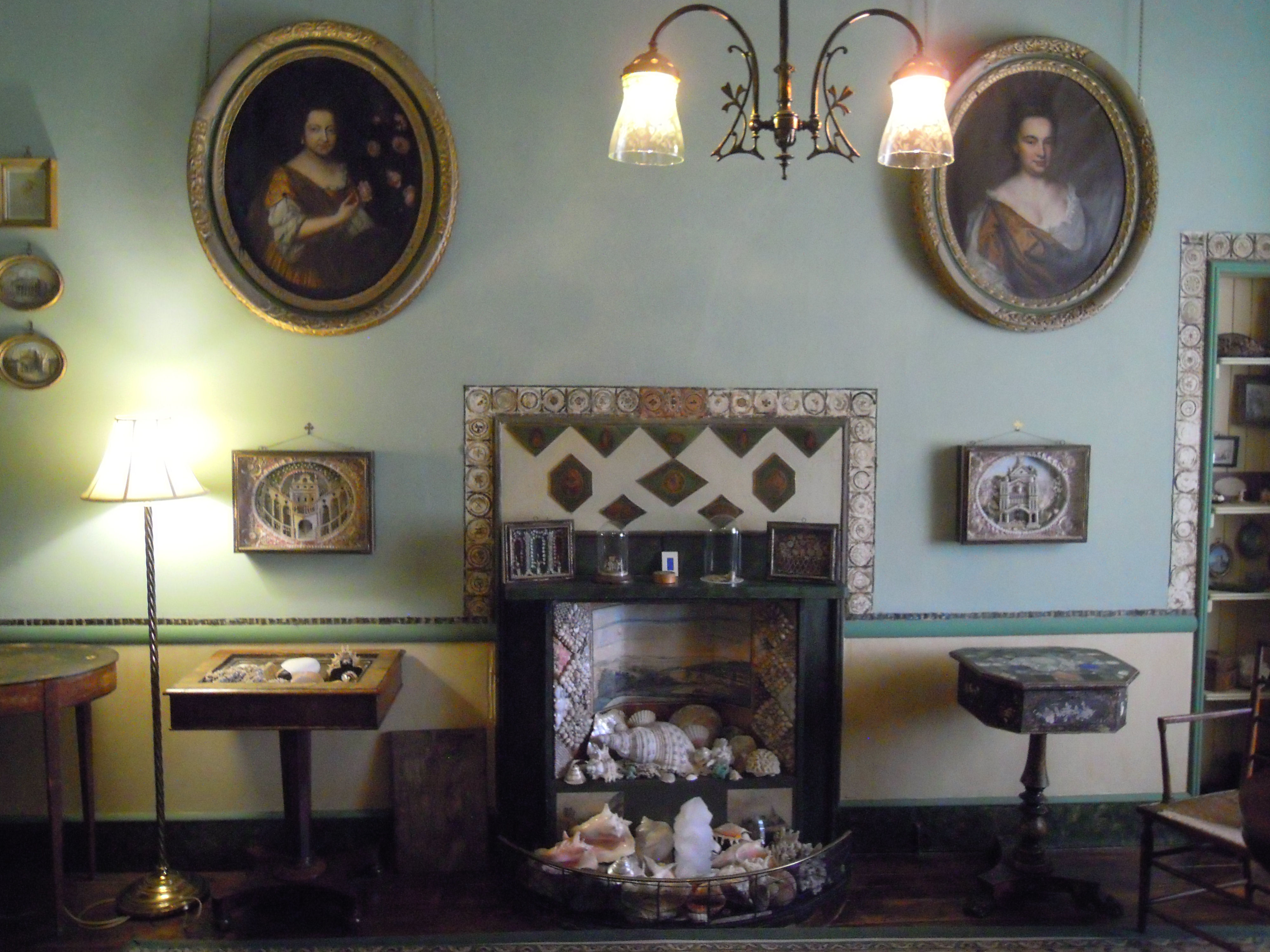
Display of shells in an ornate fireplace

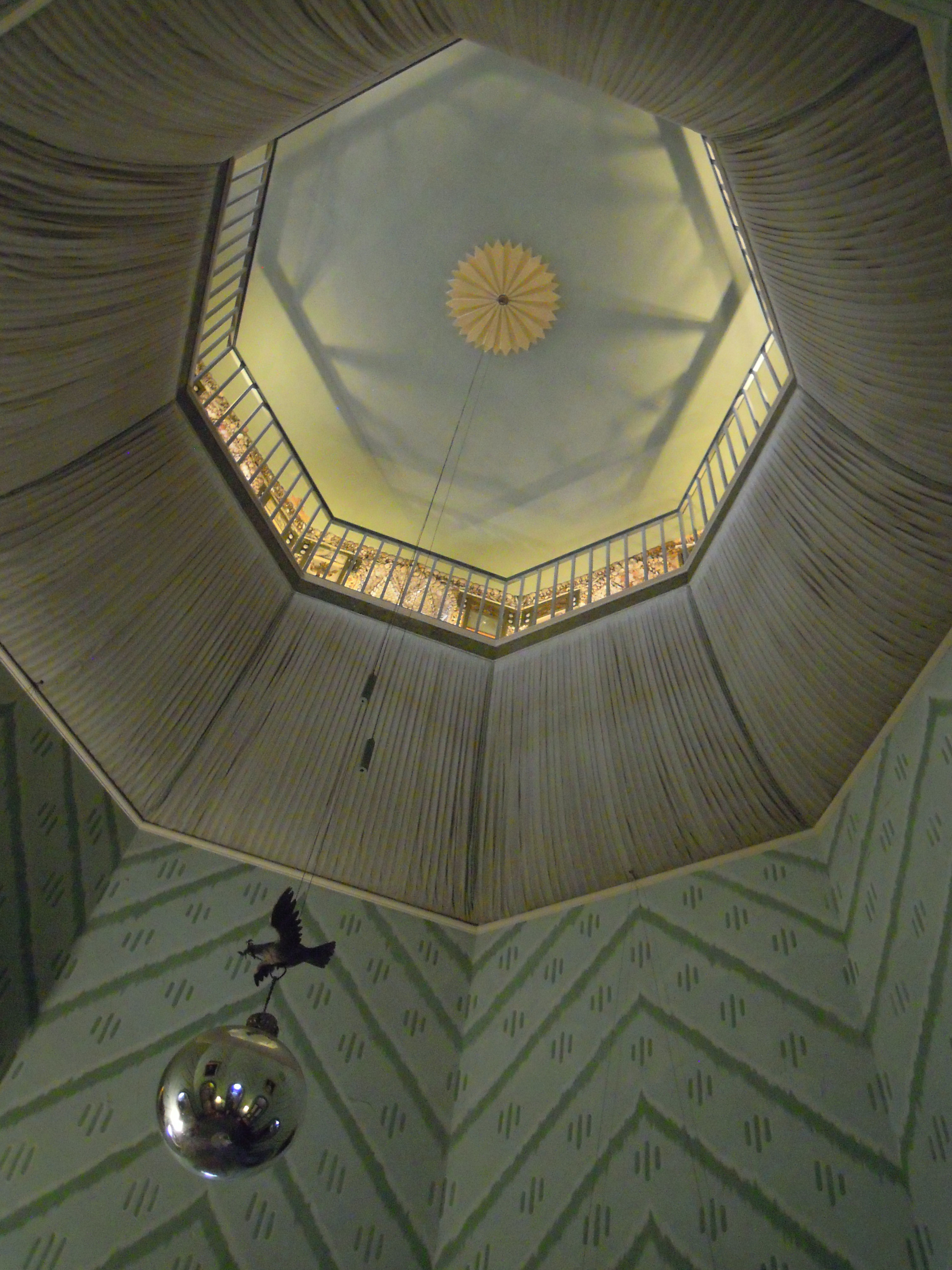
The ceiling of the Octagon with the Shell Gallery at the top

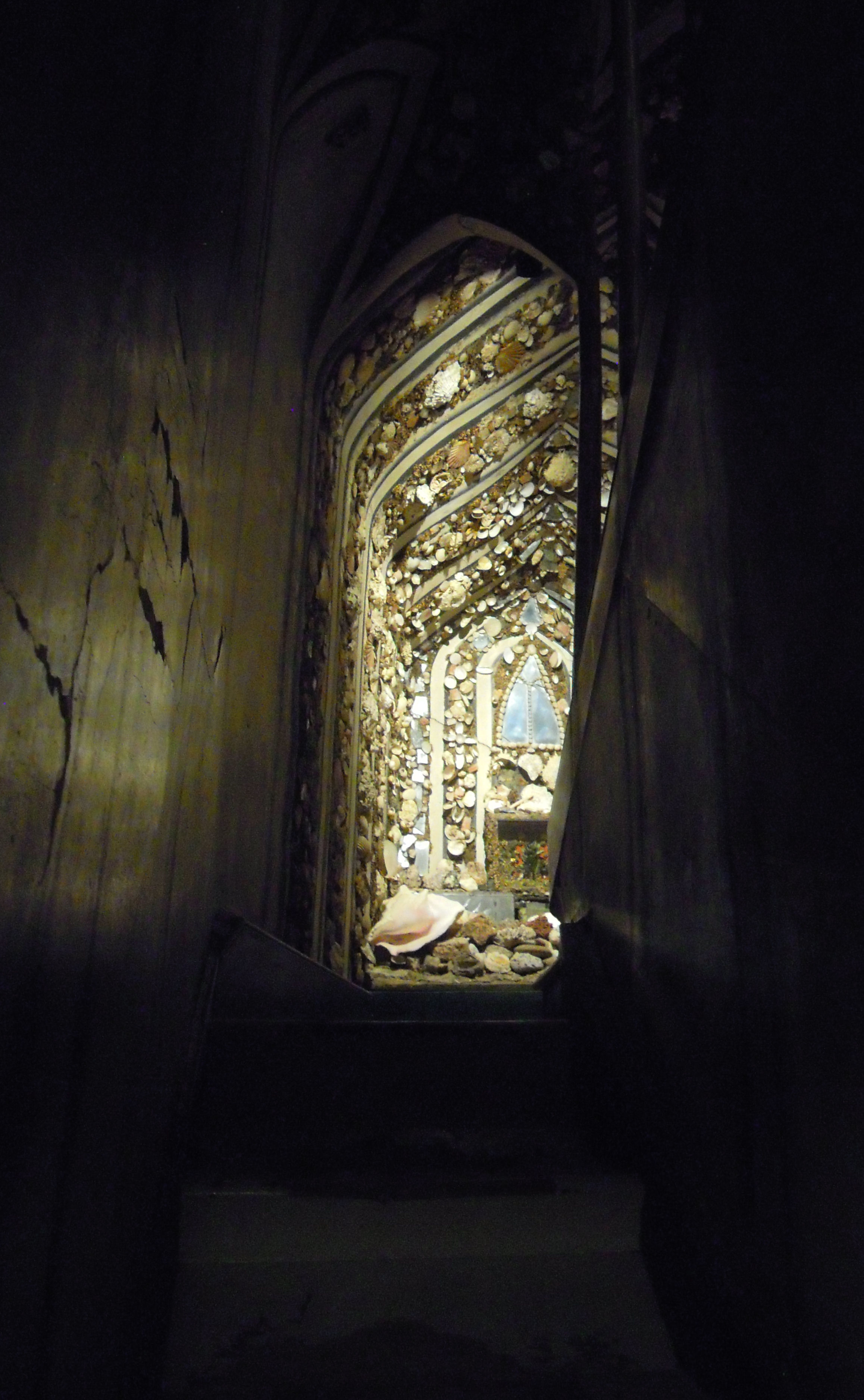
Entrance to the Shell Gallery; this is now closed to the public

== Point-in-View chapel ==
Point-in-View chapel
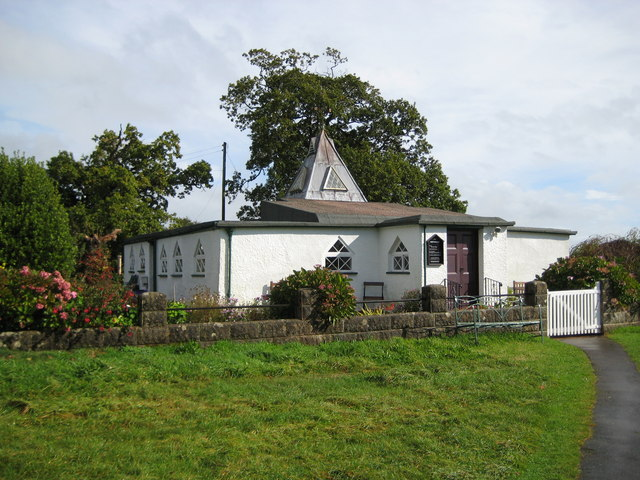
- Interactive map of Point-in-View chapel
- Location: Summer Lane Exmouth
- OS grid reference: SY 00788 83506

History
- Built: 1811

Site notes
- Area: Devon
- Governing body: Mary Parminter Charity

Listed Building – Grade I
- Official name: The Point in View
- Designated: 6 December 1949
- Reference no.: 1164937

The Parminters also built a chapel on the estate, named the Point-in-View. It has its own Grade I listing and is a registered charity.

== Gallery ==
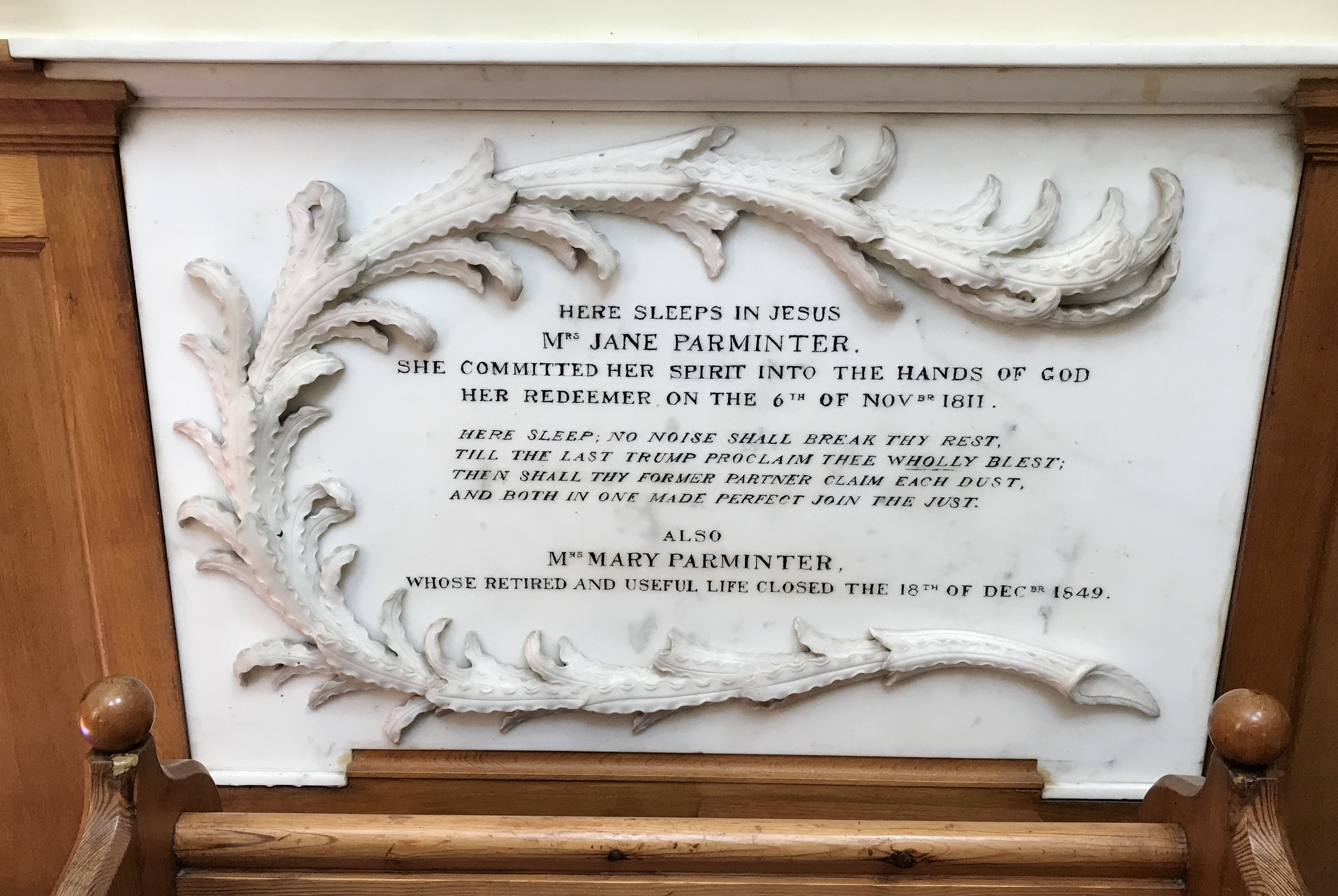
Memorial plaque to the Parminters

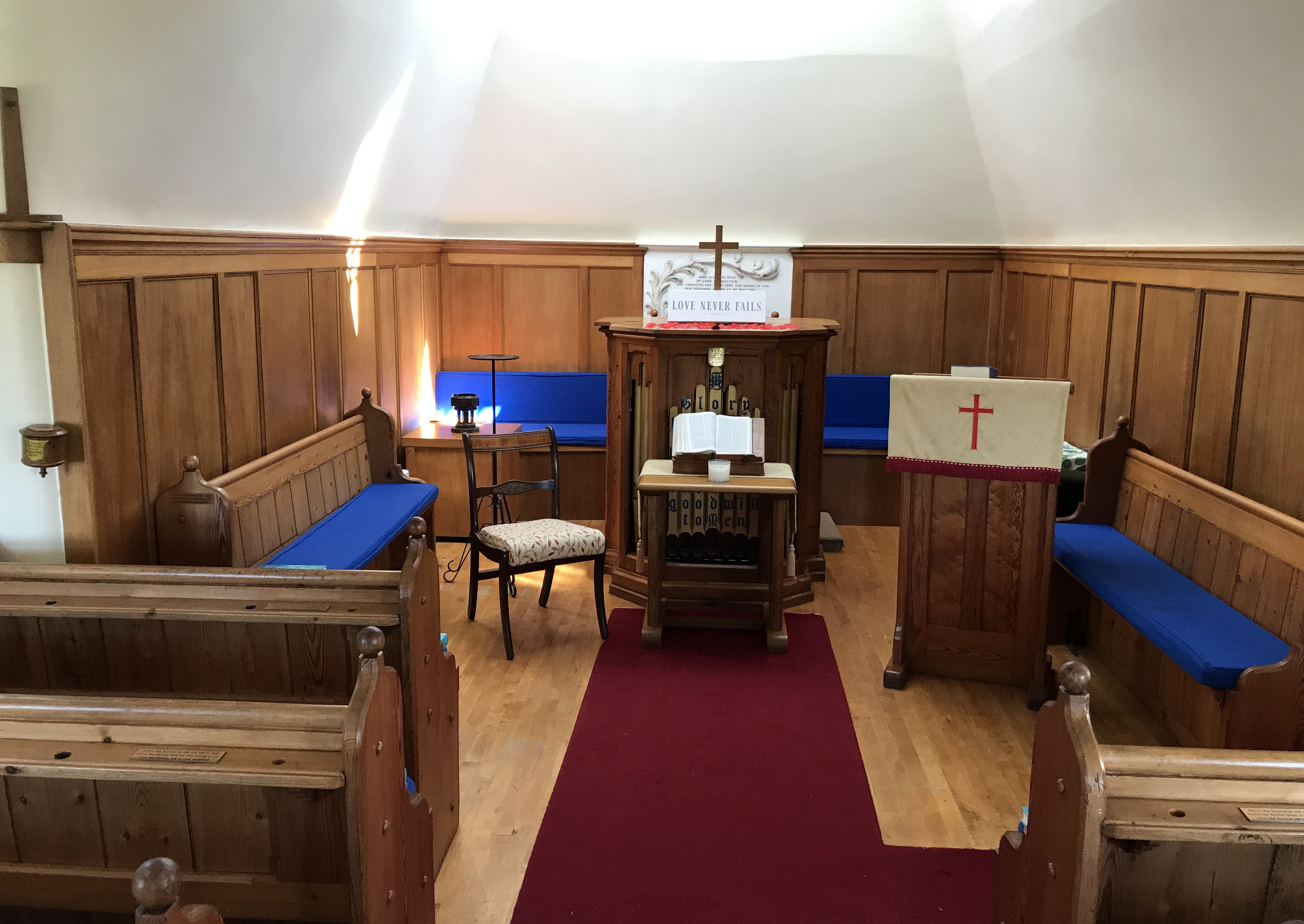
Interior of the chapel

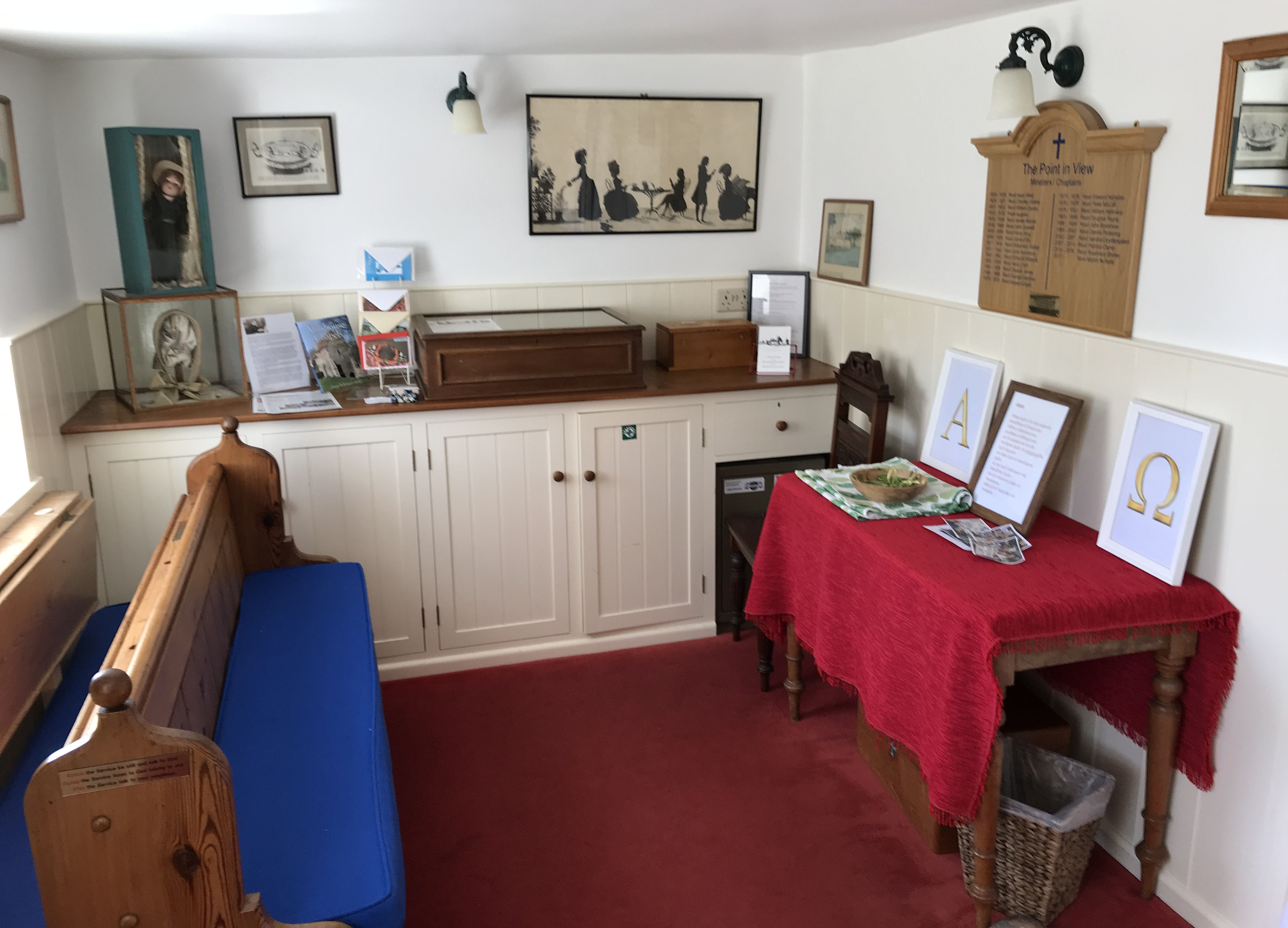
A chapel ante-room
