= Axmouth =

Village and civil parish in the county of Devon, United Kingdom

Coordinates: 50°43′N 3°03′W

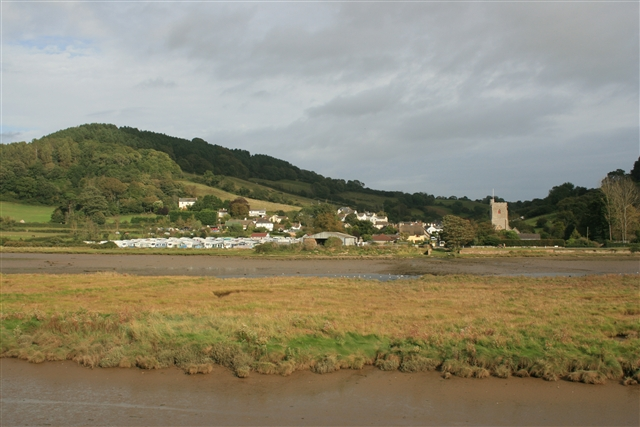
- Axmouth seen from across the River Axe and below Hawkesdown Hill

- Location within Devon
- Population: 493
- Civil parish: Axmouth
- District: East Devon
- Shire county: Devon
- Region: South West
- Country: England
- Sovereign state: United Kingdom
- Police: Devon and Cornwall
- Fire: Devon and Somerset
- Ambulance: South Western
- UK Parliament: Honiton and Sidmouth

Audio recording of birds on the estuary, by Lawrence Shove, March 1966

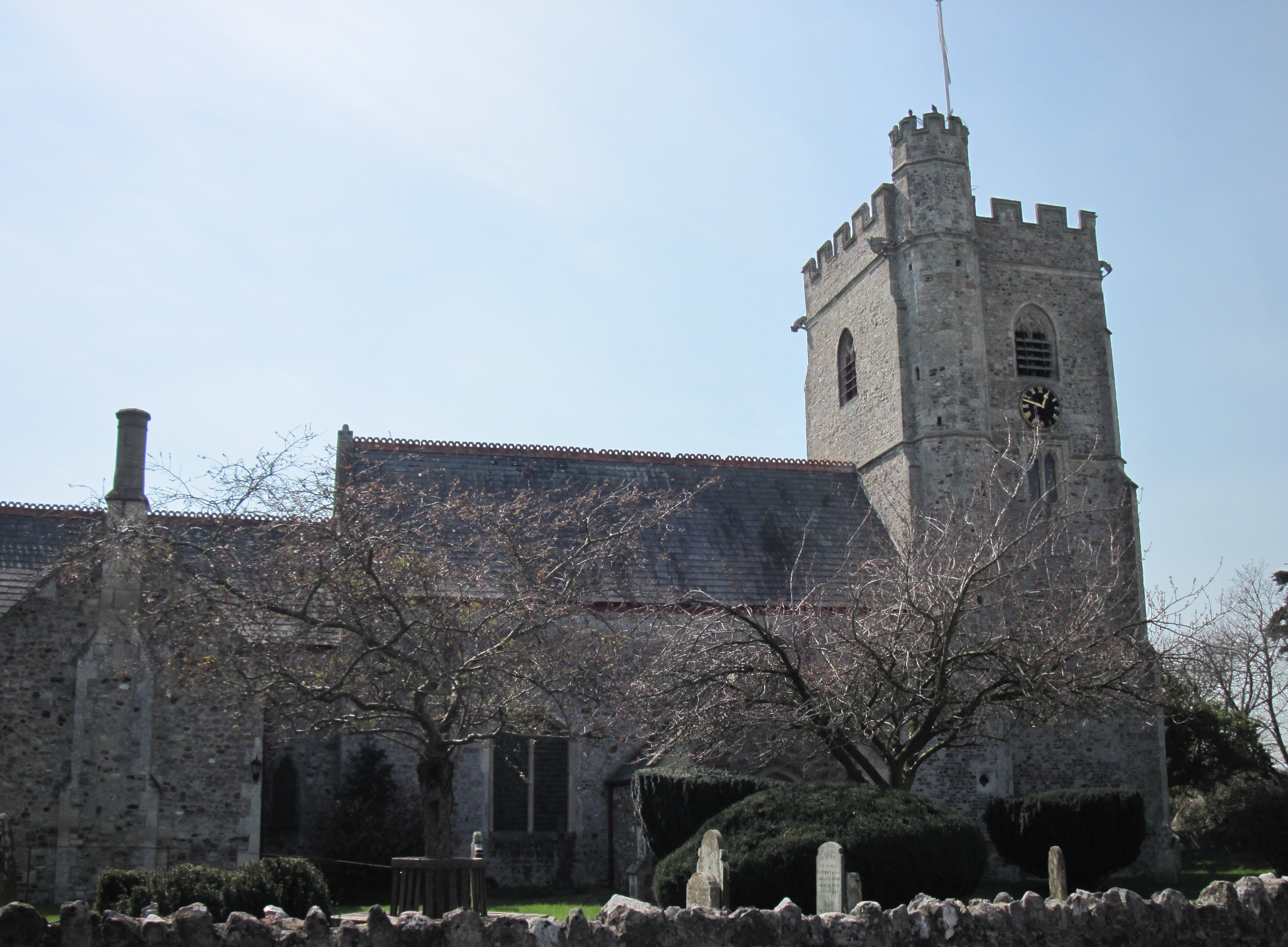
St Michael's Church, Axmouth

Axmouth is a village, civil parish and former manor in the East Devon district of Devon, England, near the mouth of the River Axe. The village itself is about 1 mile (1.6 km) inland, on the east bank of the Axe estuary. The parish extends along the estuary to the sea, and a significant distance to the east. The village is near Seaton and Beer which are on the other side of the Axe estuary.

According to the 2001 census the parish had a population of 493.

== History ==
Hawkesdown Hill, just above the village, was occupied during the Iron Age, and remains found on the site suggest it was subject to an attack by the Romans. In the will of King Alfred the Great, a copy of which is in the British Library, Axmouth was left to his youngest son Aethelweard. By the 13th century, the manor belonged to the Benedictine Loders Priory, but in 1414, Henry V seized and dissolved Loders Priory, and gave the manor of Axmouth to the Augustinian Syon Abbey.

According to Historic England, 'Axmouth was ranked as a major port by the mid-14th century and accounted for 15% of the country's shipping trade'. The remains of a late medieval fishing boat can be seen at low tide in the River Axe, just south-west of the village. Over the following years the estuary of the River Axe silted up and the village ceased to be a viable port. In 1870 the current Axmouth Harbour was developed at the river mouth, closer to the town of Seaton than the village of Axmouth, but within the civil parish of Axmouth.

Within the parish of Axmouth are various historic estates including:

- Bindon, an ancient seat of the Wyke family, and inherited on marriage to Mary Wyke by Walter Erle of Colcombe in the parish of Colyton in Devon, an officer of the Privy Chamber to King Edward VI and to his sisters Queen Mary I and Queen Elizabeth I. Erle also purchased the manor of Axmouth following the dissolution of Syon Abbey.
- Stedcombe is a Grade I listed William and Mary house and estate, to the north of Axmouth village. It was built in about 1697 by Richard Hallett on the site of the earlier Stedcombe House, that was destroyed during the English Civil War. The Hallett family acquired the estate in 1691 from Sir Walter Yonge of Escot.

== Architecture ==
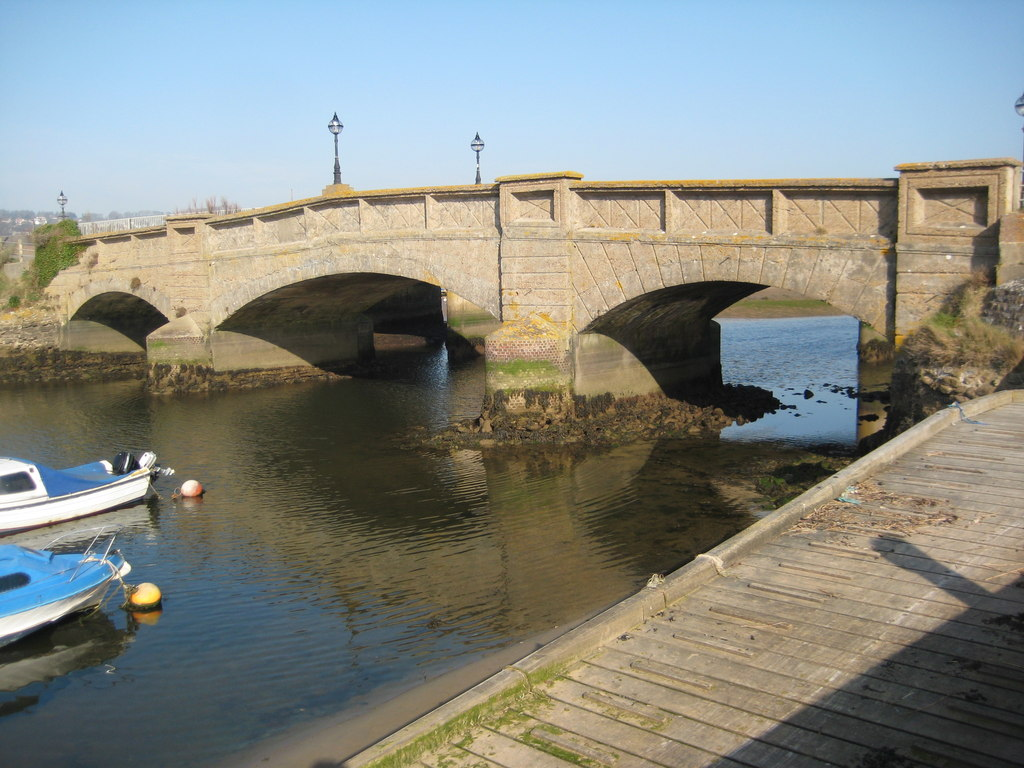
Axmouth bridge, constructed 1877.

The civil parish of Axmouth includes 38 listed buildings, and 3 scheduled monuments. These include:

- St Michael's Church, a grade I listed church in the village with a fifteenth-century tower and a carved Norman doorway and pillars
- Stedcombe House, a grade I listed house, with grade II* listed outbuildings and walls, situated to the north of the village
- Axmouth Old Bridge, an early concrete bridge, both grade II* listed and a scheduled monument, at Axmouth Harbour
- Bindon Manor House, a grade II* listed house to the east of the village
- Stepps Country Club, a grade II* listed house, now used as a country club, in the village
- Hawkesdown Camp, a hill fort and scheduled monument, to the north of the village
- The Axe Boat, a scheduled monument and wreck of a late medieval or post-medieval coastal sailing vessel, in the estuary off the village
- The Harbour Inn, a grade II listed public house in the village

== Governance ==
The civil parish of Axmouth is governed by a parish council. Administratively, the civil parish falls within the East Devon local government district and the Devon shire county. Administrative tasks are shared between county, district and parish councils. Axmouth forms part of the Honiton and Sidmouth county constituency represented in the House of Commons of the Parliament of the United Kingdom. It elects one Member of parliament (MP) by the First-past-the-post system of election. The current MP is Richard Foord, a member of the Liberal Democrats.
