= River Axe (Lyme Bay) =

River in southwest England

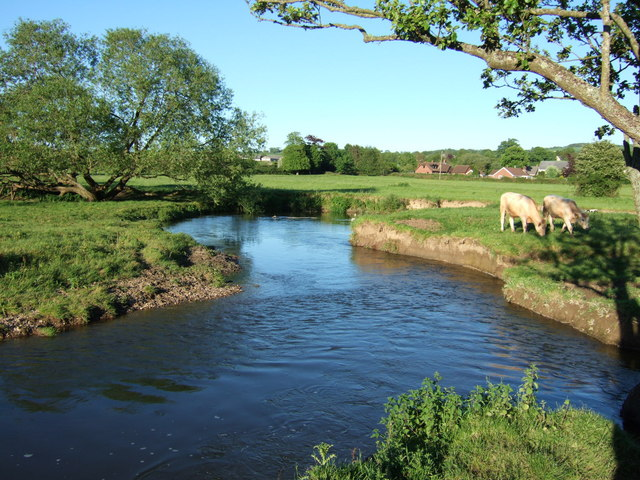
- The River Axe near Axminster

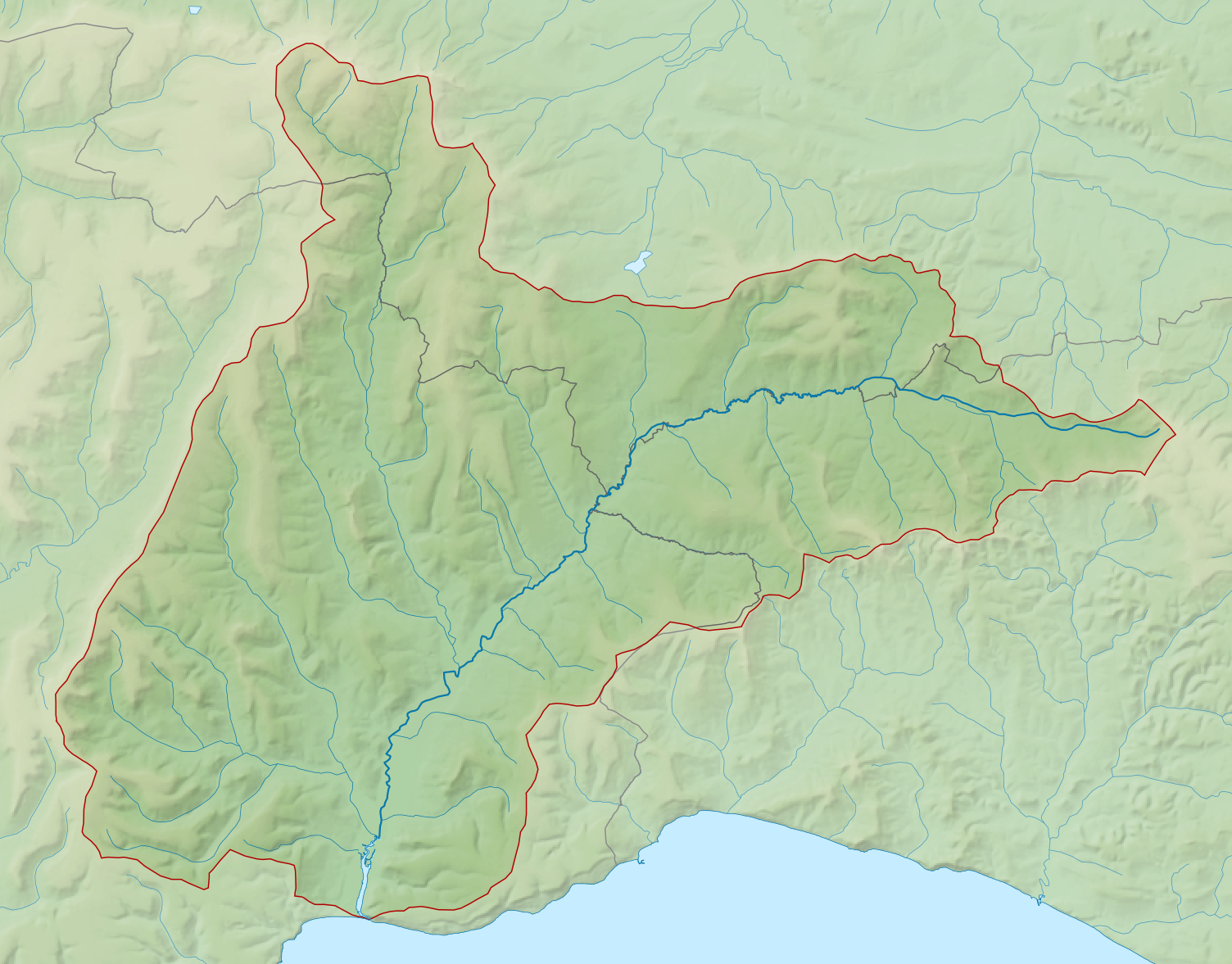
- Course and catchment of the River Axe

Location
- Country: England within the United Kingdom
- Counties: Devon, Dorset and Somerset

Physical characteristics
- Source
  - location: Chedington, Dorset
  - coordinates: 50.83953°N 2.71711°W
- Mouth: Lyme Bay, English Channel
  - location: Seaton, Devon
  - coordinates: 50.70200°N 3.05509°W
- Length: 35 km (22 mi)

Basin features
- Tributaries
  - left: Blackwater River
  - right: River Yarty, River Coly

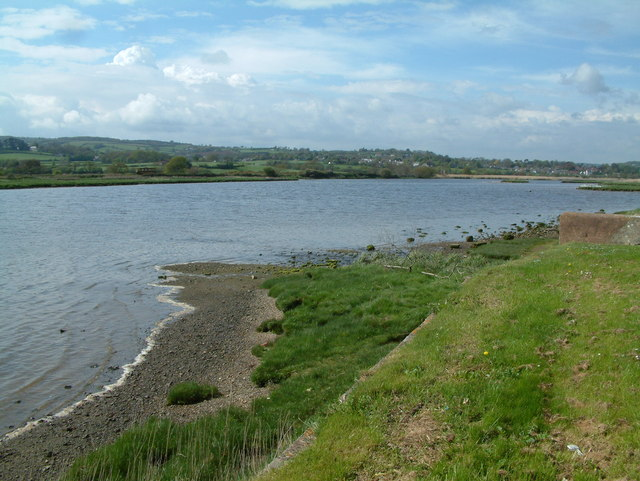
The Axe Estuary near Axmouth

The River Axe is a 22-mile (35 km) long river in the counties of Dorset, Somerset and Devon, in the south-west of England. It rises in Dorset and flows south to Lyme Bay which it enters through the Axe Estuary in Devon. It is a shallow, non-navigable river, although its mouth at Seaton has some boating activity. The name Axe derives from a Common Brittonic word meaning "abounding in fish", and is cognate with pysg (a variant of pysgod), the Welsh word for fish.

The River Axe rises in several streams to the south of Chedington in Dorset, close to the source of the River Parrett that flows north to the Bristol Channel. The Axe then flows west through Mosterton and Seaborough before turning south and forming the county boundary between Dorset and Somerset. In this section it flows past the villages of Wayford and Winsham, and the former Forde Abbey. At a point some 3 miles (4.8 km) north of Axminster it is joined by the Blackwater River and enters the county of Devon. It is then joined by the River Kit, before passing through Axminster after which it is joined by the River Yarty and continues south by the villages of Whitford and Colyford, where it is joined by the River Coly. At this point it spreads out to form the tidal Axe Estuary. The estuary flows past the village of Axmouth, on its eastern bank, before passing through a high shingle bank to the east of the seaside town of Seaton and entering Lyme Bay on the English Channel.

In 1999, a section of the river extending for 13 kilometres (8.1 mi)—from the confluence with the Blackwater River to Colyford Bridge—was designated a Site of Special Scientific Interest (SSSI) by England's conservation body, Natural England. It was described as supporting "an exceptionally diverse aquatic and marginal flora". The river's diversity comes from its active geomorphology, which has created a number of natural features that support niche ecologies; it also comes from there being a limited number of trees on the river bank, allowing in light; and also the riverbed stability in the lower reaches of the river. A majority of the SSSI runs through Devon; only 160 yards (150 m) runs through Dorset. The underlying geology of the riverbed is alluvium with areas of valley gravel, clay, shale and marl. The fish life in the river is considered of European interest; ;other animals include more generally includes salmon, bullheads, otters, medicinal leeches and kingfishers, whilst there is a diverse aquatic and marginal plant life. The geomorphology of the meanders south of Axminster are the particular geological interest.

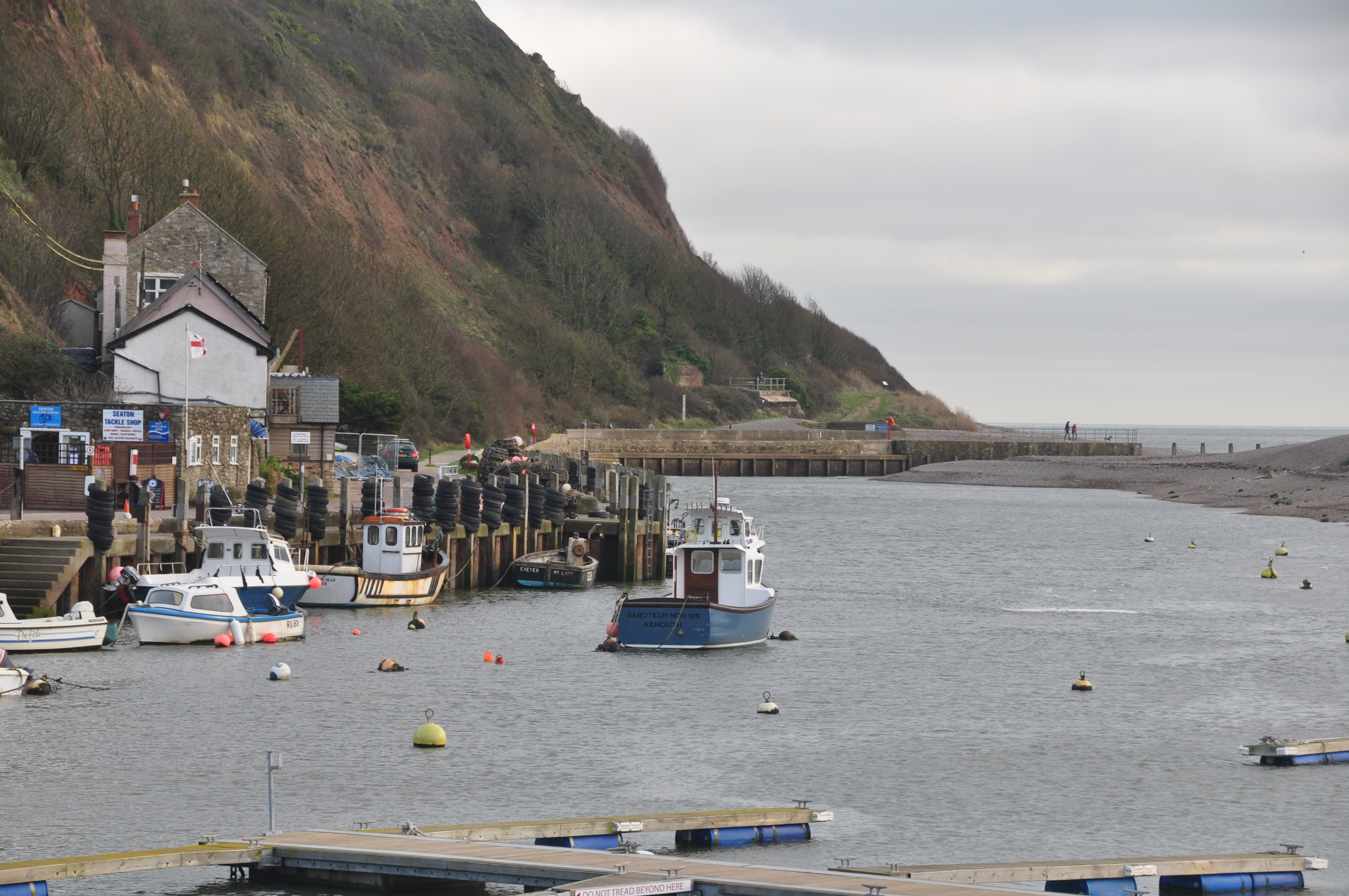
The River Axe estuary near its mouth

Although now shallow and largely unnavigable, the estuary of the Axe was once important for shipping. According to Historic England, the village of Axmouth, which is some 1 mile (1.6 km) inland, 'was ranked as a major port by the mid-14th century and accounted for 15% of the country’s shipping trade'. The remains of a late medieval fishing boat can be seen at low tide in the river, just south-west of Axmouth village. Over the following years the estuary silted up and a moving shingle bar formed at the mouth. In 1870 the current Axmouth Harbour was developed at the river mouth. Although the harbour is nearer the town of Seaton than the village of Axmouth, the harbour and all of the estuary are in the parish of Axmouth.

The estuary is flanked to its west by a series of low-level nature reserves, collectively known as Seaton Wetlands and including Seaton Marshes, Black Hole Marsh, Colyford Common and Stafford Marsh. Between them, these reserves include freshwater grazing marshes, intertidal lagoons, scrapes, ditches and bird hides, and are host to a diverse variety of birds and mammals such as otters. The reserves are separated from the estuary by the embankment of the former Seaton branch railway, which now carries the Seaton Tramway on its route between Seaton, Colyford and Colyton. with the open-topped trams offering a good view of both estuary and reserves. To its east, the estuary is flanked by the steeply rising land of the hills behind the Jurassic Coast and the Axmouth to Lyme Regis Undercliff.

Prehistoric archaeology: The Axe valley has produced evidence for some of the earliest human (Palaeolithic) activity in the south-west of England. The Broom gravel pits (near Holditch) produced at least 1,800 Lower Palaeolithic handaxes when they were quarried in the late 19th century and the 1930s and 1940s. More recent archaeological investigations suggested that these artefacts are around 300,000 years old. Similar artefacts have been found in the gravel pits around Chard Junction.
